= List of people from Newton, Massachusetts =

Newton, Massachusetts has been the home of many notable people.

== Academics ==
- Daron Acemoglu, economist and professor of economics at MIT
- Frederick M. Ausubel, molecular biologist, professor at Harvard Medical School
- David Berson, neurobiologist, professor at Brown University
- Jean Briggs, anthropologist and expert on Inuit languages, raised in Newton
- J. Walter Fewkes, ethnologist and archaeologist
- Stanley Fischer, former governor of the Bank of Israel, former professor at the MIT Department of Economics
- Alexandra I. Forsythe, author of the first computer science textbook; helped found the Stanford University Department of Computer Science
- William Tudor Gardiner, 55th governor of Maine, 1929–1933
- Caroline D. Gentile, associate professor emeritus of education, University of Maine at Presque Isle
- Michael Hammer, a founder of the management theory of business process reengineering
- H. Robert Horvitz, MIT professor of biology; won the Nobel Prize for Physiology or Medicine in 2002 together with Sydney Brenner and John Sulston
- Steven Hyman, neuroscientist and provost of Harvard University
- Ruth Langer, professor of theology at Boston College; expert on Jewish liturgy and on Christian-Jewish relations
- Robert C. Lieberman, political scientist and provost of the Johns Hopkins University
- William Stetson Merrill, classifier at Newberry Library; expert on classification of library books, author of A Code for Classifiers
- Arnold A. Offner, historian, author, and former professor
- Rosalind Picard, director of the Affective Computing Research Group at the MIT Media Lab
- Michael Rosbash, geneticist and chronobiologist at Brandeis University, recipient of the Nobel Prize in Physiology or Medicine in 2017
- Jeffrey Sachs, Harvard professor, 1980–2002; current director of the Earth Institute at Columbia University
- Ruggero Santilli, Center for Theoretical Physics of the Massachusetts Institute of Technology
- Jonathan Sarna, Joseph H. Braun and Belle R. Braun Professor of American Jewish History in the department of Near Eastern and Judaic Studies at Brandeis University
- Andrei Shleifer, economist and professor of economics at Harvard
- Isadore Singer, mathematician, recipient of the Abel Prize (2004) and National Medal of Science (1983), and Institute Professor in the Department of Mathematics at MIT
- Scott Sumner, economist and professor of economics at Bentley University
- Susumu Tonegawa, MIT professor; won the Nobel Prize for Physiology or Medicine in 1987
- Edward Wagenknecht, literary critic, prolific writer and Boston University professor, lived on Otis Street in West Newton
- Melvin M. Weiner, electrical engineer, author, inventor, the first to reduce pass-bands and stop-bands in photonic crystals to practice
- Victor Weisskopf, theoretical physicist; worked with Heisenberg, Schrödinger and Niels Bohr; group leader of the Theoretical Division of the Manhattan Project at Los Alamos
- Howard Zinn, radical historian and author of A People's History of the United States

== Actors and actresses ==
- Peggy Bernier, actress and comedienne
- Virginia Bosler, actress
- Louis C.K., born Louis Szekely, stand-up comedian, Louie TV series, actor and writer
- Jessica Chaffin, actress, comedienne, and writer
- Priyanka Chopra, actress
- Matt Damon, actor, film producer, philanthropist and screenwriter
- Dimitri Diatchenko, actor and musician
- Jennifer Dundas, actress
- Anne Dudek, actress, played Dr. Amber Volakis in TV series House
- Kathryn Erbe, actress, star of Law & Order: Criminal Intent
- Marin Hinkle, actress, best known for playing Judith Harper on CBS's Two and a Half Men
- Josephine Hull, actress
- Alex Karpovsky, actor, best known for playing Ray Ploshansky on HBO's Girls
- Jonathan Katz, actor, best known for his starring role on the animated sitcom Dr. Katz, Professional Therapist
- Karen Kondazian, actress and author
- John Krasinski, actor, best known for playing Jim Halpert on NBC's The Office
- Ben Kurland, actor
- Matt LeBlanc, actor, best known for playing Joey Tribbiani on Friends
- Jack Lemmon, Oscar-winning actor
- Christopher Lloyd, actor, best known for playing Rev. Jim in TV series Taxi and as "Doc" (Emmett Brown) in Back to the Future films
- Robert Morse, actor, star of How To Succeed in Business Without Really Trying and Mad Men
- Olga C. Nardone, actress, best known for playing three parts in The Wizard of Oz
- Hari Nef, actress, model, and writer
- B. J. Novak, comedian, writer, best known for playing Ryan Howard on The Office
- Rebecca Pidgeon, actress, singer and songwriter, wife of playwright David Mamet
- Amy Poehler, actress and comedian, Saturday Night Live and Parks and Recreation
- Robert Preston, actor, "Professor" Harold Hill in The Music Man
- James Remar, actor, known for many films and TV series Dexter
- Joe Rogan, actor and comedian
- Eli Roth, film director, producer, writer and actor
- John Slattery, actor, best known for playing Roger Sterling in Mad Men
- Arnold Stang, comic actor
- Brian J. White, actor, best known for his role in The Shield

== Artists ==
- Morgan Bassichis, comedic performer, writer, and artist
- David Bowes, painter
- Mickie Caspi, artist, calligrapher
- Tama Hochbaum, artist and photographer
- Plane Jane (Andrew Dunayevsky), drag performer and competitor on season 16 of RuPaul's Drag Race
- Roger Kellaway, Oscar-nominated and Grammy-winning composer, arranger, and pianist
- Bow Sim Mark, wushu practitioner; mother of actor Donnie Yen
- Florence Maynard, photographer
- Arthur Polonsky, draughtsman, painter and academic
- Nancy Schön, sculptor of the Make Way for Ducklings statues on Boston Common; also did statues of Winnie-the-Pooh, Piglet, and Eeyore at the Newton Free Library
- Sidewalk Sam (Robert Guillemin), folk artist
- Edwin Lord Weeks, painter

== Authors, writers, journalists, and poets ==
- Binyamin Appelbaum, journalist
- Tom Ashbrook, journalist and radio broadcaster
- Isaac Asimov, prolific science fiction and non-fiction writer
- Russell Banks, writer of fiction and poetry
- Alex Beam, columnist for the Boston Globe
- Thomas Bulfinch, author of Bulfinch's Mythology
- Ty Burr, film critic for the Boston Globe
- Virginia Lee Burton, illustrator and author of children's books
- Russell Gordon Carter, writer
- Anita Diamant, author of fiction and nonfiction books
- Ralph Waldo Emerson, essayist, poet, lecturer, philosopher
- Bill Everett, comic book writer, artist (creator of Sub-Mariner, co-creator of Daredevil)
- Isabella Gardner, poet
- Ellen Goodman, Pulitzer Prize-winning syndicated columnist
- Ann Warren Griffith, writer
- Dan Harris, correspondent for ABC News; anchor for Nightline; co-anchor for the weekend edition of Good Morning America
- Dan Katz, Barstool Sports contributor
- Nate Kenyon, author
- Raymond Kurzweil, writer, futurist, inventor
- Don Lessem, author
- Barry Levy, screenwriter, best known for the 2008 film Vantage Point
- Bill Lichtenstein, Peabody Award-winning journalist and filmmaker
- Melissa Lozada-Oliva, poet and spoken word artist
- David Mamet, playwright, screenwriter and film director
- Adam Mansbach, novelist
- Elizabeth McCracken, author
- Tova Mirvis, novelist
- Diana Muir, writer and historian
- Charles J.V. Murphy, journalist and author
- Michael Novak, author
- William Novak, author
- Robert Pinsky, former Poet Laureate of the United States
- Caroline Mehitable Fisher Sawyer, writer, editor
- Anne Sexton, poet, writer
- Edward Sheehan, journalist and author
- Samuel Shem, playwright
- Harriet Beecher Stowe, author of Uncle Tom's Cabin
- Andrew Szanton, collaborative memoirist
- Celia Thaxter, poet and writer
- Ben Ames Williams, novelist
- Jonathan Wilson, novelist and critic

== Business and industry ==
- Roger Berkowitz, owner of Legal Sea Foods
- Charles Bilezikian, co-founder of Christmas Tree Shops
- Elizabeth Boit, textile manufacturer
- Richard B. Carter, head of Carter's Ink Company 1905–1949
- Jim Davis, CEO of New Balance
- Semyon Dukach, professional gambler, entrepreneur, writer
- Leo Kahn, co-founder of Staples
- Jim Koch, co-founder and chairman of the Boston Beer Company
- Louis K. Liggett, drug store magnate
- Eddie Lowery, golf caddy, auto dealer
- Peter Lynch, mutual fund manager and philanthropist
- John Palmer Parker, early Hawaiian rancher, married into Hawaiian royal family
- Sumner Redstone, global media businessman
- Francis Edgar Stanley (1849–1918), co-inventor of the Stanley Steamer
- Freelan Oscar Stanley (1849–1940), co-inventor of the Stanley Steamer and builder of the Stanley Hotel
- Donald Valle, founder and owner of Valle's Steak House
- Richard Valle, restaurateur; son of Donald Valle; owner of Valle's Steak House

== Colonial figures ==
- Waban, 17th-century American Indian tribal chief; lived in Nonantum
- Ephraim Williams, colonel in the colonial militia during the French and Indian War and benefactor of Williams College
- Thomas Wiswall (1601–1683), prominent early citizen of the Massachusetts Bay Colony and Cambridge Village, Massachusetts

== Environmentalists ==
- Francis P. Farquhar (1887–1974), former president of the Sierra Club

== Government, education and politics ==
- Benigno Aquino Jr. and Corazon Aquino, Filipino public intellectual and political figures; lived with their five children in Newton, 1980–1983; she became the first female president of the Philippines (1986–1992); their third child and only son, Benigno III or "Noynoy", was elected president in 2010
- Benigno Aquino III, 15th president of the Philippines 2010–2016, lived in Newton 1980–1983
- Jake Auchincloss, member of the U.S. House of Representatives for Massachusetts's 4th congressional district
- Thomas Cardozo, first African-American State superintendent of Education in Mississippi (1874–1876)
- Evan Falchuk, founder of the United Independent Party and candidate for governor of Massachusetts in 2014
- Barney Frank, former U.S. representative for Massachusetts's 4th congressional district
- Joseph Healy, U.S. representative from New Hampshire
- Joseph Kennedy III, son of Joseph P. Kennedy II and former U.S. representative for Massachusetts's 4th congressional district
- Richard Lakin, Freedom Rider, school principal, terrorism victim
- Horace Mann, public educator, college president (Antioch College) and U.S. representative from Massachusetts
- Lisa Monaco, United States deputy attorney general and former Homeland Security advisor
- Mohammad Reza Pahlavi, shah of Iran; exiled after Ayatollah Khomeini took power; briefly lived in Newton
- Cyrus Peirce, public educator, college president of Framingham State College (once located in West Newton); namesake of the Peirce School in West Newton
- John Pigeon, representative of Newton to the Massachusetts Provincial Congress and served as Massachusetts commissary general while a resident
- Roger Sherman, only person to have signed all four basic documents of American sovereignty: the Continental Association of 1774, the Declaration of Independence, the Articles of Confederation, and the United States Constitution; born and spent his first two years in Newton
- Henry Lawrence Southwick, author, actor and 3rd president of Emerson College (1908–1932)
- Harry F. Stimpson Jr., lawyer who was the U.S. ambassador to Paraguay
- Nguyen Van Thieu, exiled president of South Vietnam
- Rochelle Walensky, director of the Centers for Disease Control and Prevention
- Setti Warren, former mayor of Newton and director of the Harvard Kennedy School Institute of Politics
- John W. Weeks, mayor of Newton; U.S. congressman and U.S. senator from Massachusetts; U.S. Secretary of War under Harding
- Sinclair Weeks, son of John W. Weeks; born in West Newton; like his father, served as mayor of Newton and U.S. senator; U.S. secretary of commerce under President Dwight Eisenhower

== Military ==
- James S. Gracey, commandant of the U.S. Coast Guard

== Music ==
- Robert Beaser, composer, professor, the Juilliard School
- Leonard Bernstein, composer, conductor, pedagogue, pianist
- Dai Buell, pianist, performed the first piano recital on radio in 1921, lived at the Aloha Bungalow
- Ralph Burns, songwriter, bandleader, composer, conductor, arranger and bebop pianist
- Rob Chiarelli, multiple Grammy Award winner
- Catie Curtis, folk/pop singer
- Stephen Custer, cellist with the Los Angeles Philharmonic, grew up in Newton
- Fat Mike, lead singer and bassist of punk rock band NOFX
- Alfred Genovese, principal oboist of Metropolitan Opera and Boston Symphony Orchestra
- Osvaldo Golijov, Grammy award-winning composer of classical music
- Avi Jacob, singer-songwriter
- Mike Mangini, drummer for Dream Theater
- Vaughn Monroe, singer, trumpeter and big band leader
- Jane Morgan, popular singer, specializing in traditional pop music
- Jesse Novak, composer
- Aoife O'Donovan, singer-songwriter, lead singer of band Crooked Still
- Bijan Olia, film composer and songwriter
- Seiji Ozawa, Boston Symphony Orchestra Music Director Laureate
- Horatio Parker, composer, first dean of Yale School of Music, born in Auburndale (a village of Newton)
- Rachel Platten, singer and songwriter
- Seth Putnam, singer and leader of grindcore band Anal Cunt
- Fritz Richmond, jug and washtub bass player
- Mark Sandman, lead singer of the alternative rock band Morphine
- Jason Solowsky, composer

== Philosophy, religion and spirituality ==
- Ram Dass (Dr. Richard Alpert), author, philosophic and religious guru
- Mary Baker Eddy, founder of the Church of Christ, Scientist; her last home has been preserved as the Dupee Estate-Mary Baker Eddy Home
- Timothy Leary, author, psychologist, lecturer at Harvard, advocate of L.S.D.-25 (i.e., lysergic acid diethylamide) and other entheogens

== Physicians ==
- Donald Berwick, former administrator of the Centers for Medicare and Medicaid Services; candidate for Massachusetts governor in 2014
- Atul Gawande, general and endocrine surgeon at Brigham and Women's Hospital
- Kurt Julius Isselbacher, M.D., physician and the former Mallinckrodt Distinguished Professor of Medicine at Harvard Medical School and director emeritus of the Massachusetts General Hospital Cancer Center
- Sara Murray Jordan, gastroenterologist

== Political activists ==
- Charles Jacobs, founder of the American Anti-Slavery Group and of The David Project Center for Jewish Leadership
- Andrea Levin, director of the Committee for Accuracy in Middle East Reporting in America
- Leonard Zakim, prominent New England religious and civil rights leader

== Producers and directors ==
- Andrew Bujalski, film director, screenwriter, and actor
- Brad Falchuk, writer, director, and producer of Nip/Tuck and Glee
- Lyn Greene, writer, director and producer of Nip/Tuck, Boss and Masters of Sex
- Eli Roth, film director, producer, actor
- Bruce Sinofsky, director of documentary films, Brothers Keeper, The Paradise Lost Trilogy, Metallica: Some Kind of Monster (TV series), Iconoclasts
- Julie Taymor, director of Broadway theatre and film

== Psychologists and psychiatrists ==
- Julian Jaynes, psychologist
- Kenneth Levin, psychiatrist and historian
- Kurt Lewin, the "father of social psychology"

== Radio, television personalities ==
- Paula S. Apsell, television producer
- Tom Ashbrook, host of the NPR radio show On Point
- Andy Katz, Big Ten Network and former ESPN College Basketball reporter
- Dan "Big Cat" Katz, host of Pardon My Take and Barstool Sports personality
- Maria Lopez, former judge, TV personality
- Jade McCarthy, ESPN sportscaster
- Suzyn Waldman, color commentator for New York Yankees

== Science, medicine and technology ==
- Dan Bricklin, with Bob Frankston, co-creator of VisiCalc, the first spreadsheet
- Charles Stark Draper, inventor of the aircraft inertial guidance system; founder of MIT's Draper Labs
- Reginald Fessenden (1866–1932), inventor and radio pioneer; his house at 45 Waban Hill Road is listed in the National Register of Historic Places
- Bob Frankston, with Dan Bricklin, co-creator of VisiCalc, the first spreadsheet
- Atul Gawande, surgeon, writer for The New Yorker
- Wes Hildreth, USGS geologist, born in Newton
- Ashish Jha, dean of Brown University School of Public Health and White House COVID-19 pandemic response coordinator
- Jonathan Mann, head of the World Health Organization's global AIDS project
- Charles Johnson Maynard, naturalist and ornithologist; lived in the Charles Maynard House
- Thomas C. Peebles, physician, responsible for first isolating the measles virus, setting the stage for the development of a vaccine
- Michael Rosbash, geneticist and chronobiologist at Brandeis University, recipient of the Nobel Prize in Physiology or Medicine in 2017
- Judy Smith, nurse who disappeared from Philadelphia in 1997; found murdered in North Carolina five months later
- Rochelle Walensky, director of the Centers for Disease Control and Prevention and former chief of the Division of Infectious Diseases at Massachusetts General Hospital
- Frank E. Winsor, civil engineer and chief engineer of the Quabbin Reservoir project

== Songwriters ==
- Katharine Lee Bates, professor of English at Wellesley College and author of the lyrics to "America the Beautiful"
- Samuel Francis Smith, Baptist minister and author of the lyrics to "My Country, 'Tis of Thee", also known as "America"

== Sports ==
=== Auto racing ===
- Pete Hamilton, NASCAR racer, winner of the 1970 Daytona 500

=== Baseball ===
- The following are current and former players of the Boston Red Sox:
  - Matt Clement (former)
  - Jim Corsi (former) (born in Newton)
  - John Curtis (former) (born in Newton)
  - Hal Deviney (former) (born in Newton)
  - JD Drew (former)
  - Bob Gallagher (former) (born in Newton)
  - Gabe Kapler (former)
  - Mark Loretta (former)
  - Doug Mirabelli (former)
  - Trot Nixon (former)
  - David Ortiz (former)
  - Wily Mo Peña (former)
  - Jimmy Piersall (former)
  - Jason Varitek (former)
  - Ted Williams (former)
- The following also played Major League Baseball:
  - Bob Barr (born in Newton)
  - Sean DePaula (born in Newton)
  - Bob Dresser (born in Newton)
  - Jake Fishman (born in Newton)
- The following play for a national team:
  - Jake Fishman, American-Israeli (born in Newton; plays for Team Israel)
  - Ben Wanger, American-Israeli baseball pitcher (born in Newton; plays for Team Israel)

=== Basketball ===
- Veronica Burton (born 2000), WNBA player
- Geoffrey Gray (born 1997), American player in the Israeli Basketball Premier League
- Tom Heinsohn (1934–2020), NBA player
- Jayson Tatum (born 1998), NBA player

=== Boxing ===
- Joe DeNucci, middleweight boxer and MA State Auditor

=== Fencing ===
- Paul Friedberg, Olympic fencer

=== Figure skating ===
- Tenley Albright (born 1935 in Newton Centre), first American female skater to win an Olympic gold medal; other titles included 1952 Olympic silver medal, 1953 and 1955 World Champion, 1953 and 1955 North American champion, and 1952–1956 U.S. national champion
- Gracie Gold, 2014 and 2016 U.S. champion, Olympic team bronze medalist, born in Newton
- Jennifer Kirk, 2000 World Junior champion, born in Newton
- John Summers, 1978–80 national champion in ice dancing

=== Football ===
- Kiko Alonso, former linebacker for the Miami Dolphins
- Will Levis, current quarterback for the Tennessee Titans
- Patrick Sullivan, former general manager, New England Patriots

=== Soccer ===
- Ben Brewster, forward and coach
- Sam Brill, defender

=== Skateboarding ===
- Andy MacDonald, eight-time X Games gold medalist and eight-time World Cup Skateboarding champion

=== Tennis ===
- James Delaney (born 1953), tennis player
