= Prospect Street =

Prospect Street may refer to the following places:

== Canada ==
- Prospect Street, local name for York Regional Road 34 in Newmarket, Ontario

== United States ==
Historic Districts:

- Prospect Street Historic District, New London, Connecticut
- South Prospect Street Historic District, Hagerstown, Maryland
- Mill-Prospect Street Historic District, Hatfield, Massachusetts
- Prospect-Gaylord Historic District, Amherst, Massachusetts

Historic Houses:

- House at 88 Prospect Street, Wakefield, Massachusetts
- House at 90 Prospect Street, Wakefield, Massachusetts
- House at 491 Prospect Street, Methuen, Massachusetts
- House at 526 Prospect Street, Methuen, Massachusetts

== See also ==
- Prospect Avenue (disambiguation)
- Prospect Park (disambiguation)
- "Prospect Street", a 1985 song by the Big Dish
