= Prospect =

Prospect may refer to:

== General ==
- Prospect (marketing), a marketing term describing a potential customer
- Prospect (sports), any player whose rights are owned by a professional team, but who has yet to play a game for the team
- Prospect (mining), a particular geological area on which searching for minerals or fossils is commonly carried out

== Arts, entertainment, and media ==
=== Periodicals ===
- Prospect (architecture magazine), a Scottish architecture magazine
- Prospect (magazine), a monthly British essay and comment magazine
- The American Prospect, an American quarterly policy magazine

=== Other uses in arts, entertainment, and media ===
- Prospect (film), 2018 American science fiction film starring Sophie Thatcher, Jay Duplass, and Pedro Pascal
- Prospect (rapper), American rapper and former member of Terror Squad
- Prospect (Slovenian band), a progressive metal band from Ljubljana, Slovenia
- "Prospect" (song), by Iann Dior featuring Lil Baby
- Prospects (TV series), British series
- "Prospects", a song by Madness from the 1984 album Keep Moving

== Organizations and enterprises ==
- Prospect (trade union), a United Kingdom trade union of professionals
- Prospect Pictures, a television production company in London, England
- The Prospect Studios, a television studio in Los Angeles, United States
- Prospects (charity), a UK Christian charity
- Prospect Medical Holdings, a United States private healthcare system
- King's Academy Prospect, a secondary school in West Reading, Berkshire, England

=== Sports ===
- Edmonton Prospects, baseball team in the Western Canadian Baseball League

== Places ==
=== Australia ===
- Prospect, New South Wales, suburb of the City of Blacktown, near Sydney
  - Division of Prospect, an electoral district in the Australian House of Representatives, in New South Wales, surrounding the suburb
- Prospect, Queensland, Queensland
- Prospect, Tasmania, suburb of Launceston, Tasmania
- City of Prospect, a local government area in South Australia
  - Prospect, South Australia, inner metropolitan suburb of Adelaide

=== Canada ===
- Prospect, Nova Scotia
  - Lower Prospect, Nova Scotia
  - Prospect Bay, Nova Scotia

=== United Kingdom ===
- Prospect, Cumbria, a settlement in Oughterside and Allerby, Cumbria, England
- Prospect, a townland in County Antrim, Northern Ireland
- Prospect, a townland in County Tyrone, Northern Ireland

=== United States ===
- Prospect (Topping, Virginia), listed on the NRHP in Virginia
- Prospect, Connecticut
- Prospect, Georgia
- Prospect, Indiana
- Prospect, Kentucky
- Prospect, Maine
- Prospect, New York
- Prospect, North Carolina
- Prospect, Ohio
- Prospect, Oregon
- Prospect, Pennsylvania
- Prospect, Bradley County, Tennessee
- Prospect, Giles County, Tennessee
- Prospect, Virginia
- Prospect House (Princeton, New Jersey), the former president's house and current faculty house, known also as Prospect (and listed as that on U.S. National Register)
- Mount Prospect, Illinois

=== Elsewhere ===
- Prospect, Corlough, a townland in County Cavan, Republic of Ireland
- Prospect, a place in Saint Vincent and the Grenadines

== See also ==
- Prospect Avenue (disambiguation)
- Prospect High School (disambiguation), various high schools
- Prospect Hill (disambiguation)
- Prospect Park (disambiguation)
- Prospector (disambiguation)
- Prospekt (disambiguation)
