= Charles Winship House =

Historic house in Massachusetts, United States

- U.S. National Register of Historic Places
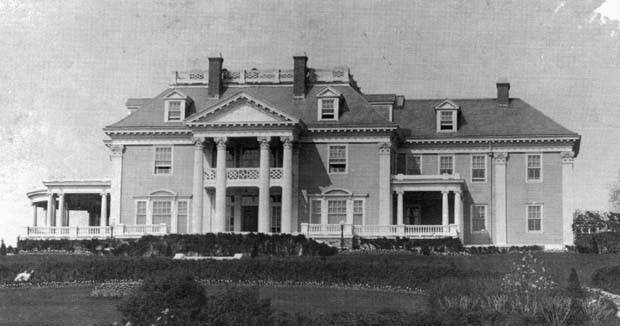
- Charles Winship House Wakefield, MA circa 1922

- Location within Massachusetts Location within the United States
- Location: Wakefield, Massachusetts
- Coordinates: 42°29′51″N 71°5′10″W
- Built: 1901
- Architect: Hartwell & Richardson
- Architectural style: Colonial Revival
- MPS: Wakefield MRA
- NRHP reference No.: 89000717
- Added to NRHP: July 6, 1989

The Charles Winship House was a historic house located at 13 Mansion Road and 10 Mansion Road in Wakefield, Massachusetts. The 2 1/2-story mansion (for which the road is named) was built between 1901 and 1906 for Charles Winship, proprietor (along with Elizabeth Boit) of the Harvard Knitting Mills, a major business presence in Wakefield from the 1880s to the 1940s. It was the town's most elaborate Colonial Revival building, featuring a flared hip roof with a balustrade on top, and a two-story portico in front with composite capitals atop fluted columns.

The house was listed on the National Register of Historic Places in 1989.

The architect of the house was the Boston-based firm Hartwell & Richardson. The ornate interior was designed by the firm Irving and Casson – A. H. Davenport Co.. Both firms were famous for their meticulous design as well as high quality of workmanship and materials. During The Winship House's construction in 1902, Irving and Casson – A. H. Davenport Co. was commissioned for work on the White House renovation.

== History ==
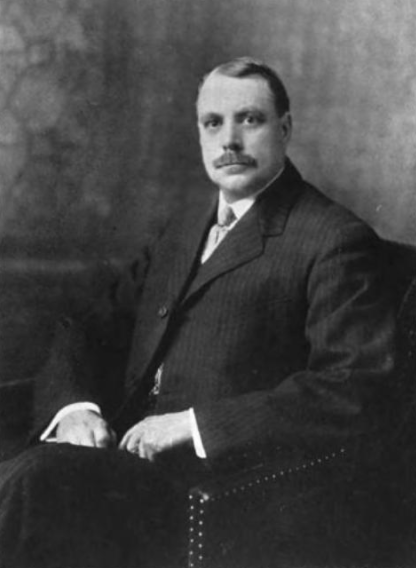
Charles Newell Winship (1863–1946)

In 1922, Charles Newell Winship purchased 12 additional acres of surrounding land which he developed. The development, comprising Newell Road, Walter Avenue and Fox Road, was known at the time as Winship Manor. After his death in 1946, his family sold the entire estate—which comprised approximately 33 acres—to the Sisters of Charity of Nazareth in early 1947. The house was used as a convent to house more than 40 Sisters of Nazareth, a number which required several areas of the house to be modified to a more utilitarian standard. An academy was soon built on 19 acres of the house's grounds. In 1978 the house and 14 remaining acres were sold to a developer who built single family residences. The house became a private residence again, but was confined to just over an acre of land and surrounded by modern single family houses. The academy closed its doors in 2009 and the remaining 19 acres of the original estate became 47 single family houses. Due to an accumulation of damage, the historic house was demolished on July 8, 2020.

== Damage and demolition ==
In March 2005, a large fire tore through the upper floors of the house. The fire required assistance from 8 other communities, and although the house was not totally lost to the fire, it weathered serious fire, smoke and water damage. Although the fire damage was repaired, when the house was listed for sale in 2007 one prospective buyer observed buckling in the walls, presumed to be the result of water from the firefighter's efforts winding up in the walls.

Due to the 2008 bankruptcy and foreclosure of Theresa Whitaker, the house's final resident and owner, and subsequent inability of the bank to sell the property, the house fell victim to obscene vandalism. Both the house's exterior and interior fell into states of significant disrepair and neglect until August 2019, when local real estate agent James Gattuso purchased the home. Due to serious structural as well as cosmetic damage, consensus was reached that the house would not be financially feasible to restore, and it was demolished on July 8, 2020. Two single family houses will take its place on the 1.14-acre lot.

== Gallery ==
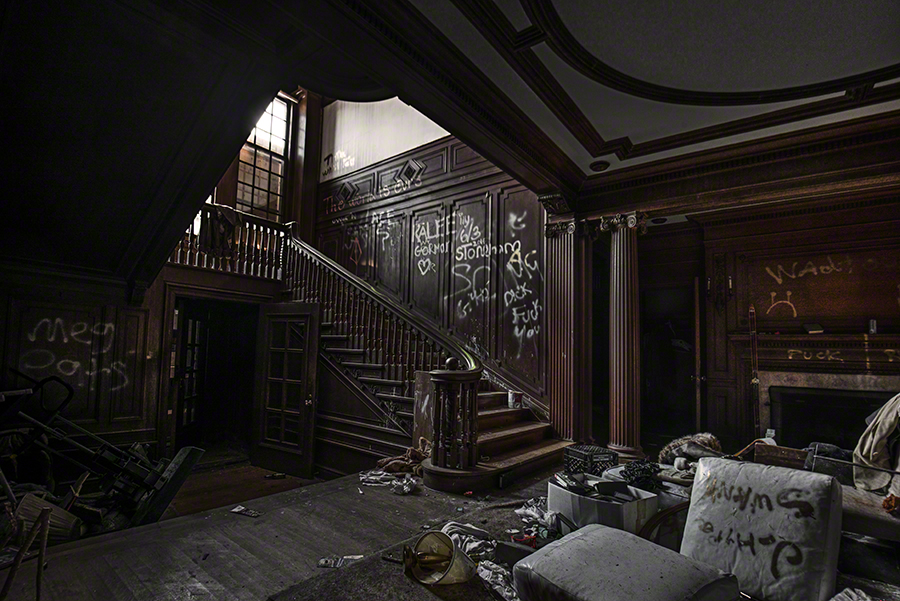
Staircase (post-vandalism)

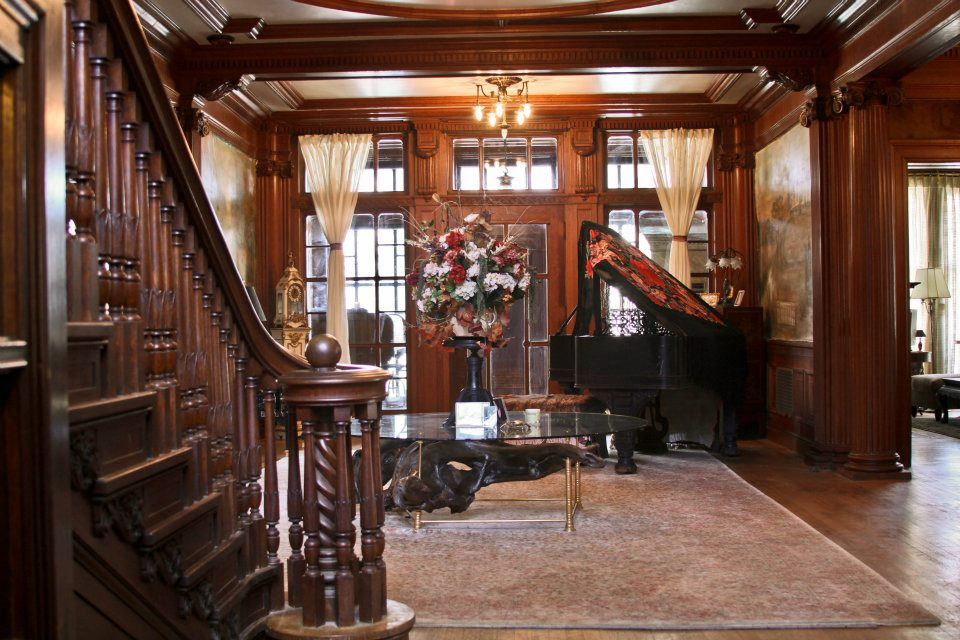
Interior (pre-vandalism)

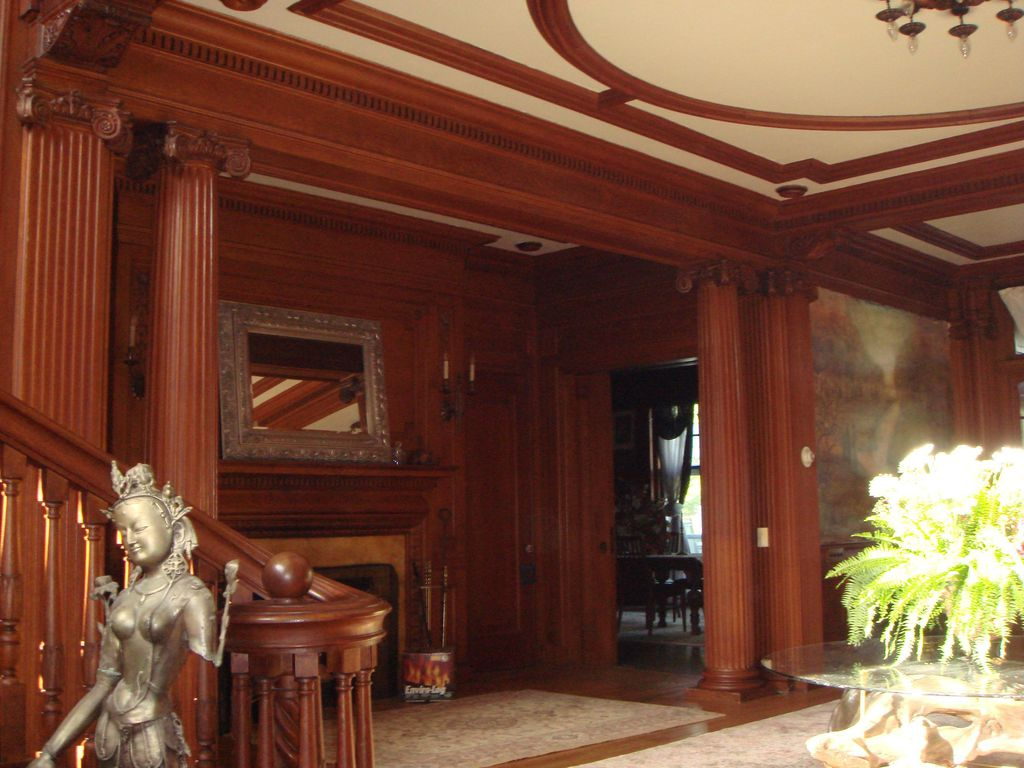
Interior (pre-vandalism)

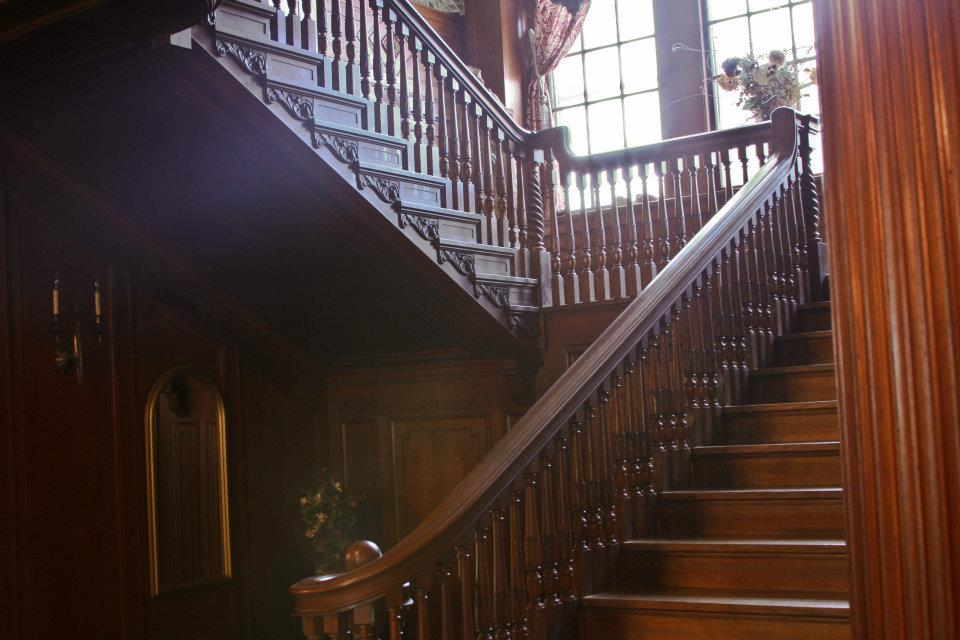
Staircase (pre-vandalism)

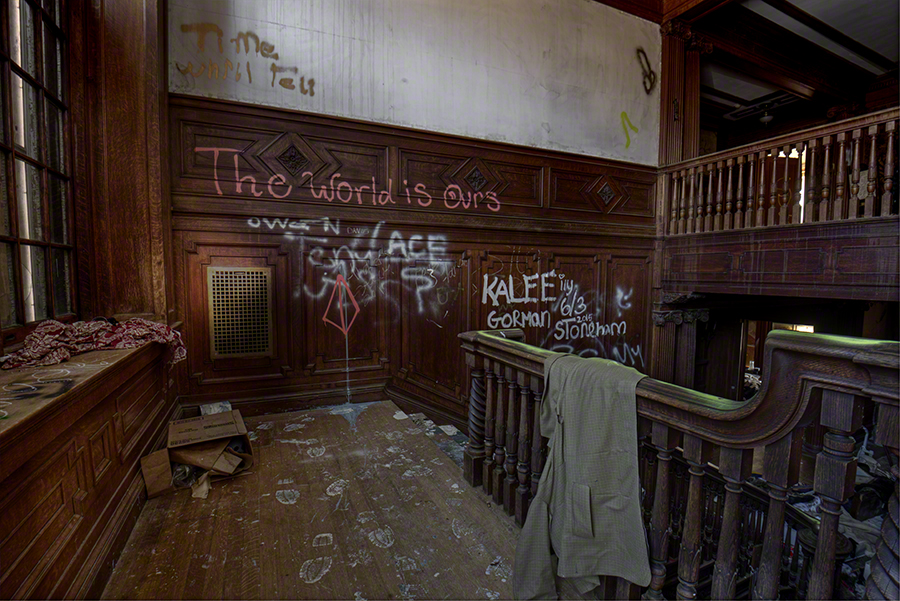
Staircase (post-vandalism)

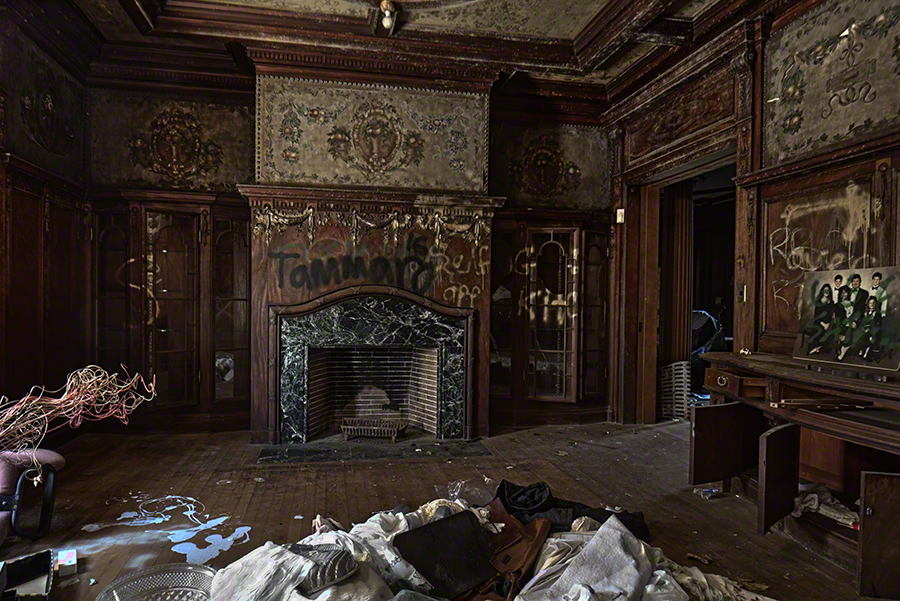
Interior (post-vandalism)

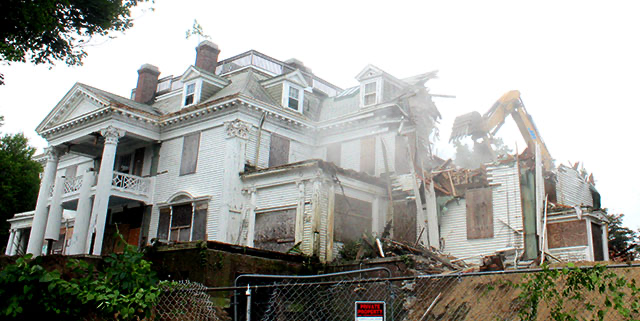
Demolition

== See also ==
- Elizabeth Boit House
- National Register of Historic Places listings in Wakefield, Massachusetts
- National Register of Historic Places listings in Middlesex County, Massachusetts
