= Straumfjörð =

Fjord in Vinland in the Sagas of Icelanders

Straumfjörður (Icelandic), or Straumfjǫrðr (Old Norse), sometimes anglicised to Straumsfjordr, Straumfjordr, Straumsfjord or Straumfjord, is according to the Sagas of Icelanders a fjord in Vinland where Thorfinn Karlsefni set up a temporary settlement. It is described in the Saga of Erik the Red, but not in the Greenland saga. Its name translates to "Current-fjord", "Stream-fjord" or "Tide-fjord".

Two somewhat different versions of the travels of Karlsefni appear in the sagas; they are found in the Hauksbók and the Flateyjarbók. They tell that Straumsey (Current-isle) lies at the mouth of Straumfjörð; this is an island with an extreme density of birds.

The whereabouts of Straumfjörð – complete with its associated island of Straumsey – has been, and is, subject to intense speculation, with at least 15 suggested locations on the Atlantic coast of North America. These possible locations range from as far north as the entrance to Northern Canada's Ungava Bay, to as far south as the entrance to New York state's Hudson River.

== Location ==
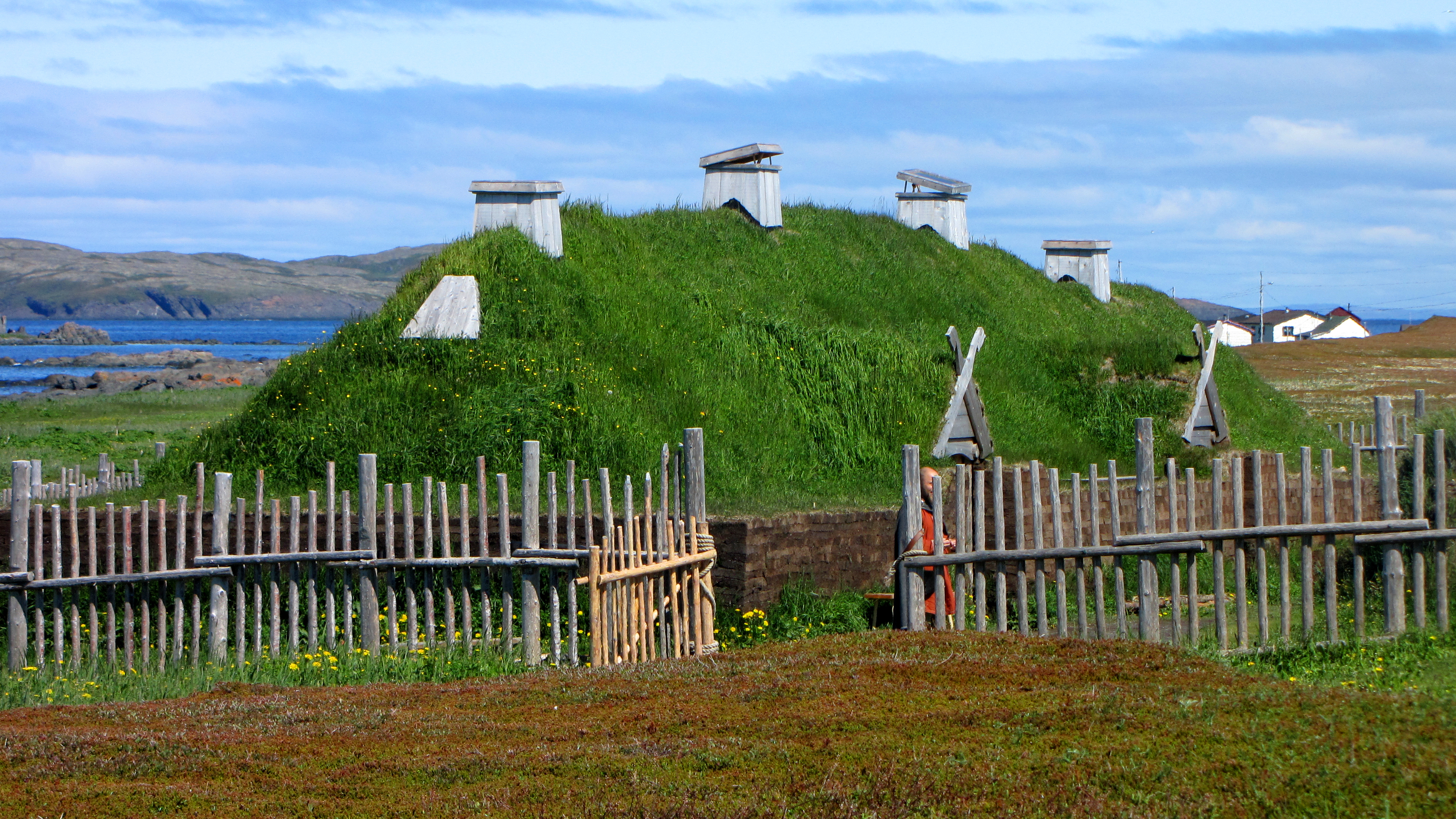
L'Anse aux Meadows

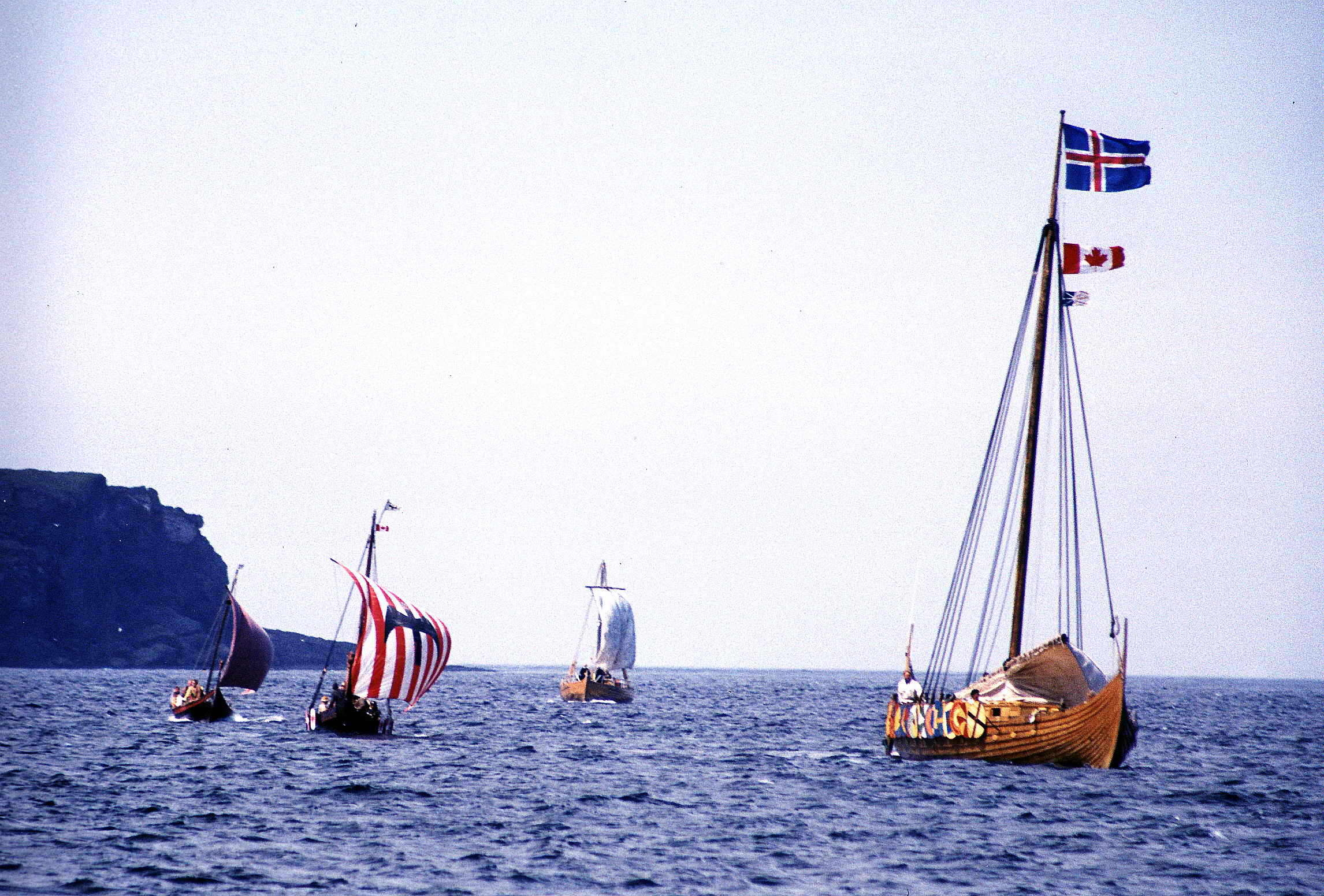
The 2000 AD reconstruction of the voyage, with replica Norse ships

The exact location of Straumfjörð is disputed. The only Norse settlement which has been recovered in North America beyond Greenland is located on L'Anse aux Meadows.

According to the Saga of Erik the Red the location is significantly south of Markland.

=== Directions ===
These directions to the fjord are based on Septhon's 1880 translation.

Thorfinn Karlsefni, trying to find a country visited by Leif Ericson, sailed from Brattahlíð, Eastern Settlement to Vestribygd (probably the Western Settlement), both in Greenland. From here, they moved on to "Bjarneyjar" ("Bear Islands", possibly Disko Island). After two half-days or days of sail with northerly wind they arrived at Helluland ("Country of Flat Stones"). After another two half-days or days of sail with northerly winds, they arrived at Markland ("Forest Country").

Off Markland to the southeast was an island that Karlsefni and his company called Bear Island. From Markland, after yet another two half-days or days of sail, they encountered a headland, possibly Kjalarnes. Keeping the coast on their starboard side, they journeyed along Furdustrandir ("Wonder-strands"). Then, the coast became indented with creeks. They found grapes and wild wheat, and continued to where the shore was cut into by the fjord of Straumfjörð, with the island of Straumsey ("Current-isle") at its mouth.

To the south of Straumfjörð was Hóp, where no snow fell during winter, and on the west side of Kjalarnes was a wilderness, and a river which flowed from east to west. East of Kjalarnes was the "Irish Ocean". Straumfjörð is estimated by Karlsefni to be equidistant from Hóp and a location north of the river that runs westwards. He also regards Hóp and this location by the river to share the same mountain (or mountain range).

The "two half-days or days" [two doegr, which could refer to 12 or 24 hours], referenced three times in the saga, are important to the question of the whereabouts of Straumfjörð because they suggest the distance travelled when Karlsefni and his men, perhaps, crossed open seas. The two doegr were suggested by Carl Christian Rafn in 1841 to be equivalent to about 54 to 60 miil. He bases this on old Icelandic sources such as the Landnámabók. Miil would refer to either sjømil or to Scandinavian mile. William A. Munn (1929) assumes the two days to correspond to "about 200 miles". Jónas Kristjánsson and colleagues, in a 2012 article, suggest that 170 nautical miles, which is the distance between Greenland and Baffin Island, or an even longer distance, could well be transversed over two doegr, as modern replicas of Norse ships have been reported to make 12 knots and more under favourable conditions. Geoffrey Malcolm Gathorne-Hardy and William Hovgaard estimated a day of 24 hours' sail at about 150 miles.

=== Saga of Erik the Red ===
According to the Saga of Erik the Red, Straumfjörð is located beyond the Wonderstrands (Furðustrandir). It describes the area thus, according to the "fusioned" 1880 translation by J. Sephton:

Now, when they had sailed by Furdustrandir, they put the Scotch people on land, and requested them to run into the southern regions, seek for choice land, and come back after three half-days were passed. (...) Then did they cast anchors from the ships, and lay there to wait for them. And when three days were expired the Scotch people leapt down from the land, and one of them had in his hand a bunch of grapes, and the other an ear of wild wheat.

They said to Karlsefni that they considered they had found good and choice land. Then they received them into their ship, and proceeded on their journey to where the shore was cut into by a firth. They directed the ships within the firth. There was an island lying out in front of the firth, and there were great currents around the island, which they called Straums-ey (Stream-island). There were so many birds [another translation refers to eider-duck rather than birds in general] on it that scarcely was it possible to put one's feet down for the eggs. They continued their course up the firth, which they called Straumfjordr, and carried their cargo ashore from the ships, and there they prepared to stay. They had with them cattle of all kinds, and for themselves they sought out the produce of the land thereabout. There were mountains, and the place was fair to look upon.

They gave no heed to anything except to explore the land, and they found large pastures. They remained there during the winter, which happened to be a hard one, with no work doing; and they were badly off for food, and the fishing failed. Then they went out to the island, hoping that something might be got there from fishing or from what was drifted ashore. In that spot there was little, however, to be got for food, but their cattle found good sustenance.

Later, after giving up settling farther south due to the presence of hostile Skrælings, Karlsefni and his men again reach Straumfjörð when retreating northwards:

Afterwards they came to a headland and a multitude of wild animals; and this headland appeared as if it might be a cake of cow-dung, because the animals passed the winter there. Now they came to Straumsfjordr, where also they had abundance of all kinds.

== Hallmarks ==
If the saga's accounts and the translation are accurate, within Straumfjörð, there are mountains, the place was fair to look upon, with large pastures, a harsh winter, and hunting opportunities. A crag or crags are found within some distance. An unknown species of whale shored; it was inedible. On Straumsey, there are so many birds that it is difficult not to step on eggs, it also has poor fishery, but gave good sustenance for their cattle. Fishery failed, but later recovered.

=== Currents ===
A defining feature of Straumfjörð and Straumsey must have been high tides or strong currents. The settlement which was established farther south, Hóp may also have been connected to strong currents or tides, as it has been translated into "tidal pool" or "tidal lake". According to a 2008 article by Thomas Hayne in the journal Weather, this may give some clues as to the whereabouts of the fjord:

It is possible that Straumfjord coincides with the Leifsbudir settlement described in the Greenlander’s Saga, that is, the settlement at L’Anse aux Meadows. But, interestingly, the tidal range along the northern Newfoundland peninsula, near L’Anse aux Meadows, is only around 1m and hardly worthy of special mention in the Sagas. The non-tidal flow through the Strait of Belle Isle, which separates the northern Newfoundland peninsula from Labrador, is also weak (about 6–34cm/s according to Garrett and Petrie (1981), (their Figure 15)). Remarkably large tidal ranges do exist along the Canadian Atlantic coast. In particular, the two greatest tidal ranges in the world are at Ungava Bay and the Bay of Fundy where the ranges often exceed 10m and the associated currents would easily overwhelm a Viking ship. Some uncertainty therefore still exists about the true locations of Hóp, Straumsey and Straumfjord.

=== Climate ===
Theories on where Straumfjörð and the other places described in the saga were to a large extent based on the saga's descriptions of flora and fauna. The Northern Atlantic has since the saga was written, however, been through periods of natural changes in the regional climate and, more recently, global warming. This adds an extra layer of uncertainty to every climate-dependent observation.

=== Seamanship ===
Common sense seamanship implies to avoid open and treacherous seas unless they are unavoidable. Moreover, appropriate natural harbours would be required for the ships. This provides possible constraints to the routes taken.

== Skepticism ==
Helge Ingstad and Anne Stine Ingstad (the couple who found L'Anse aux Meadows), in The Viking Discovery of America, take a sceptical approach. They argue that:

Altogether Eirik's Saga's description of the ostensible headquarters at Straumsfjord includes a number of salient points which are improbable, and several of these would seem to show that the author made use of the Groenlendinga Saga. This fact adds weight to my previous argumentation showing that Karlsefni's headquarters at Straumsfjord is the author's invention, a substitute for Groenlendinga Saga's Leifsbudir in Vinland.

The similarities are also described by Mats G. Larsson. However, according to a 2012 article in Acta Archaeologica, it is "now generally accepted" that the two sagas were written independently.

Fridtjof Nansen, in his I tåkeheimen (In Northern Mists), written before the discovery of L'Anse aux Meadows, conjectures that the Saga of Erik the Red was inspired by tales about the Fortunate Isles and, although admitting that it is indeed possible that the Norse reached America, considers the saga to not be trustworthy. Julius E. Olson of the University of Wisconsin strongly attacked this stance in a 1911 article (see also below), saying "If there isn't a substantial background of history to the Saga of Eric the Red, it is the most clever piece of literary deception over [sic] practiced in the name of history".

== Suggested locations ==
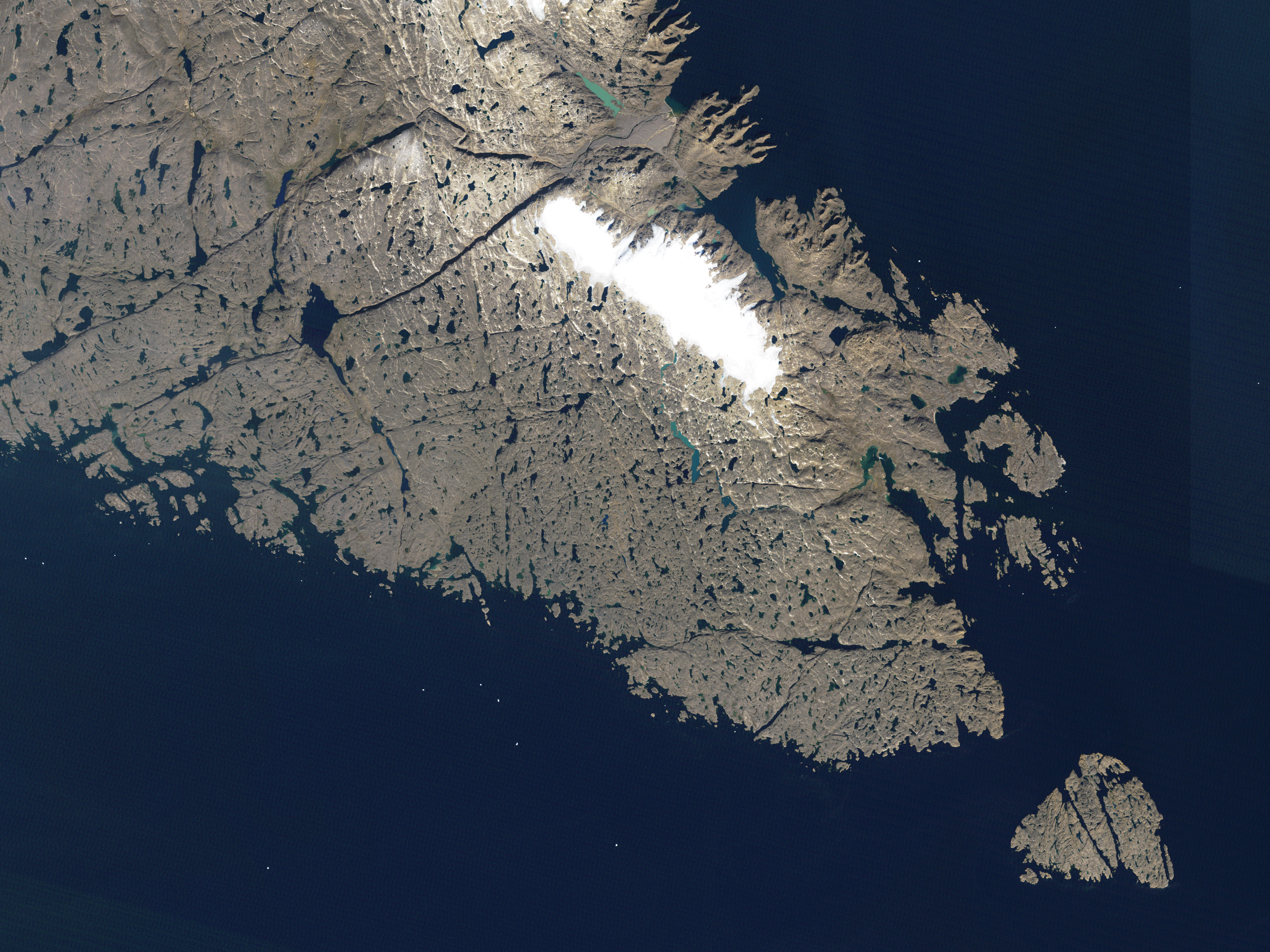
The southern tip of Baffin Island, which may have had a warmer climate at the time of the sagas. Nevertheless, is generally agreed that if the sagas are trustworthy, Karlsefni made it past this point.

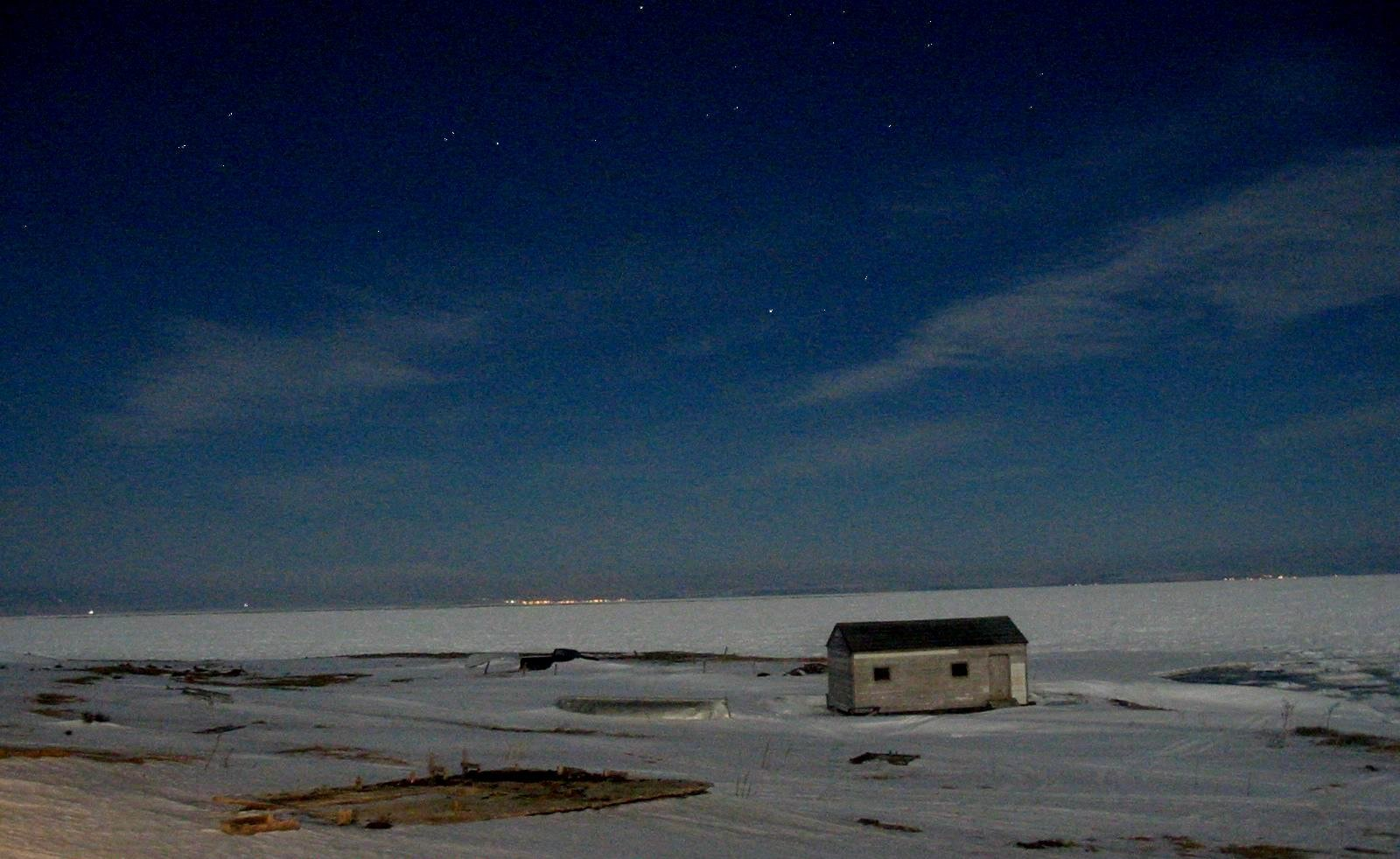
View across the Strait of Belle Isle, from Newfoundland towards Labrador.

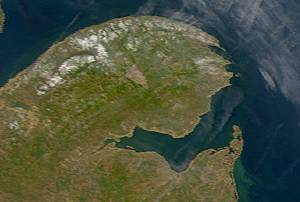
Chaleur Bay.

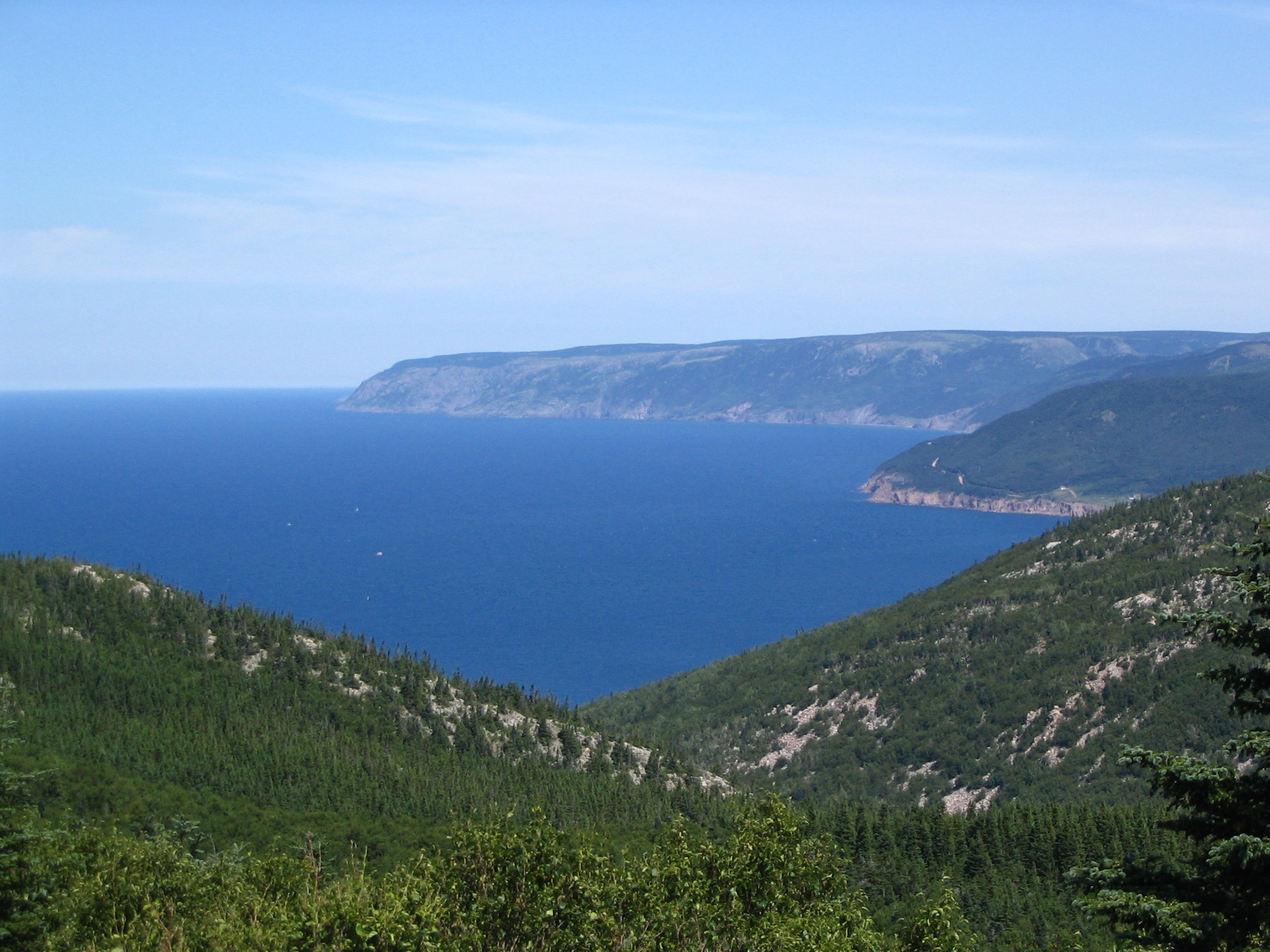
Cape Breton Island, Nova Scotia.

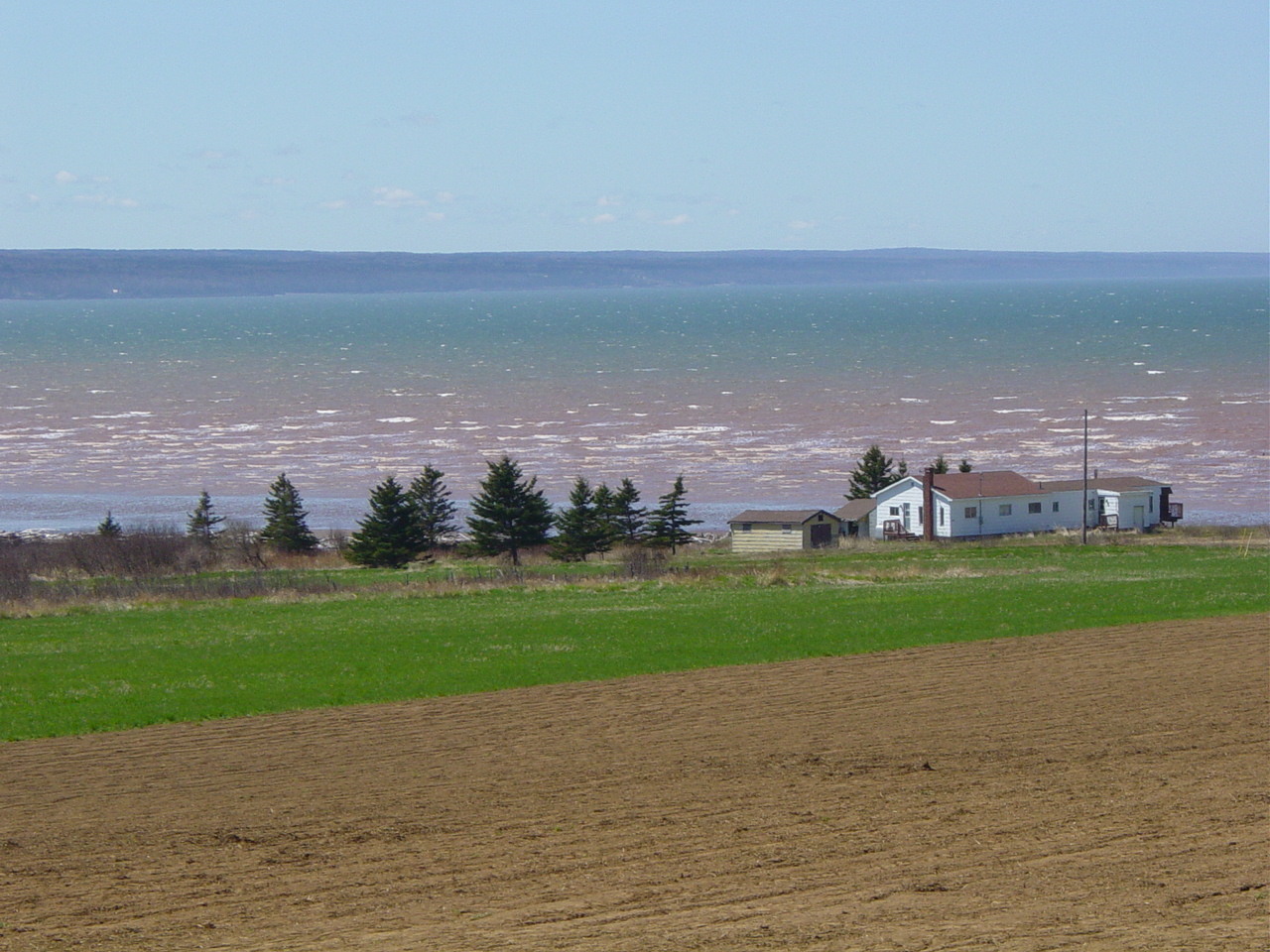
Minas Basin, Bay of Fundy, Nova Scotia, which is claimed to have the highest tides in the world

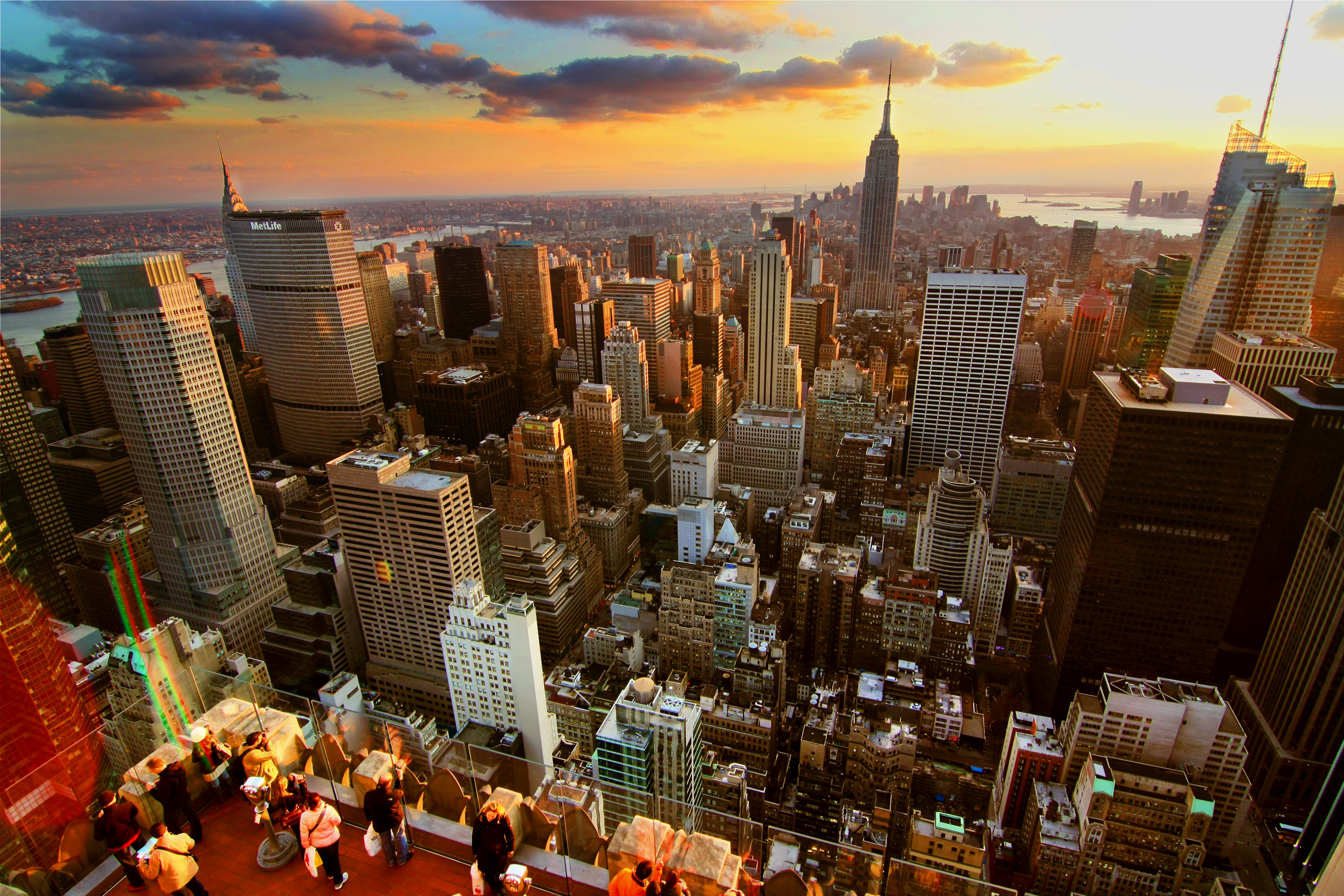
Manhattan has been suggested as a possible identity for Straumsey

The following suggestions for the location of Straumfjörð are gathered from both scholarly and popular literature. They are sorted by increasing distance from the Western Settlement, Greenland: they make increasingly optimistic estimates for the distance travelled by Karlsefni and his company. Evidently, the headland, promontory or cape Kjalarnes is difficult to identify; for seafarers the keel placed there would make its identification obvious, but it is now lost, and Furdustrandir and Straumfjörð lay beyond this point. As will be shown in the following, Kjalarnes is sometimes, but not always, identified as L'Anse aux Meadows, Gaspé Peninsula, Cape North/Cape Breton Island and Cape Cod. Many, but not all, of the following suggestions can be placed some distance beyond these points, within four coastal regions: Newfoundland; Chaleur Bay; Nova Scotia/Maine; between Cape Cod and New York.

=== Ungava Bay ===
Hayne (2008) connects the extreme tides of Ungava Bay to the alleged currents or tides at Straumfjörð and Hóp, without drawing any conclusions.

=== Sandwich Bay ===
William Hovgaard in The Voyages of the Norsemen to America (1914) takes into account the tales in the Greenland Saga. According to William Stetson Merrill, Hovgaard places Karlsefni's first winter at Sandwich Bay, Labrador. It is not made explicit whether this refers to Straumfjörð.

=== L'Anse aux Meadows ===
Birgitta Linderoth Wallace (2003) places the settlement at Straumfjörð at L'Anse aux Meadows.

=== Sop's Arm ===
Jónas Kristjánsson et al. (2012) assume that the headland of Kjalarnes referred to in the saga is at L'Anse aux Meadows, suggests that Straumfjörð refers to Sop's Arm, Newfoundland, as no other fjord in Newfoundland was found to have an island at its mouth, and as pitfall traps of possible Norse origin were found at this location.

=== St. Lawrence ===
In an 1831 letter sent from Copenhagen to the Massachusetts Historical Society, published in the 1880 Proceedings of the Massachusetts Historical Society, Rasmus Christian Rask gives a thorough account of the sagas and states,

Straumsfjörðr, I fancy, is the Bay of Saint Lawrence

This would refer, it would seem, either to the Gulf of Saint Lawrence or to lower Saint Lawrence River, depending on naming conventions in use at the time. He refuses to propose a theory of the whereabouts of Straumsey, claiming it "impossible", but hopes for future saga translations to illuminate the issue.

H. P. Steensby (da) held that "The coast lines were guides for the ancient Norsemen and they must also be ours". According to Merrill, Steensby's opinion was that

Streamfjord was the estuary of St. Lawrence River between the mouth of the Saguenay, with its Green Isle opposite, and the narrow waters about the present Isle d'Orleans.

=== Baie des Sept-Îles ===
Cappelen's History of Norway (1976) suggests a location at Baie des Sept-Îles, Quebec.

=== Chaleur Bay ===
An early 1920s book review by Sigfús Blöndal in Historisk Tidsskrift (Denmark), referring to scholarly consensus of the past decades and to the authority of Gustav Storm and H. P. Steensby, places Straumfjörð at Chaleur Bay, which separates Gaspé Peninsula from New Brunswick.

Halldór Hermansson (1930) also placed Straumfjörð in Chaleur Bay, "where the tide rises from five to ten feet". Matthias Thordarsson, who authored The Vinland Voyages (1930), agreed with his views.

=== Mira Bay ===
Juul Dieserud (1935) placed Straumfjörð at Mira Bay, Nova Scotia.

=== Strait of Canso ===
Geraldine Barnes (1995) connects Straumfjörð to the Strait of Canso between Cape Breton Island and mainland Nova Scotia, due to its high tides and the birdlife at nearby Isle Madame.

According to a 1935 article by William Stetson Merrill in The Catholic Historical Review, the opinion held by Gustav Storm was as follows:

The fjord into which the Northmen steered, when the country became "fjord-indented" (Straumsfiord) may have been one of the fjords in Gaysborough, the county of Nova Scotia lying farthest to the north-east, possibly into Canso Bay or some of the bays south of it.

=== Lobster Bay ===
While Mats G. Larsson (1992, 1999, 2000) considers the Strait of Canso a candidate due to its strong currents, but notes that the currents do not extend to islands. Therefore, he considers Lobster Bay, off the southwestern tip of Nova Scotia's Municipality of the District of Argyle, a better candidate. He writes that Samuel de Champlain named this bay "Baye courante ('Stream Bay'), i.e. the same name as the Norse one". Larsson further observes:

The currents in this bay have a rate of three knots, but the most interesting detail is maybe that there is an island off it called Seal Island, where the currents have a rate of four knots. And on this and the adjacent islands both Champlain and Denys in the first part of the 17th century report such large amounts of sea-fowl that ”no one who had not seen it would believe it possible”.

=== Bay of Fundy ===
The Bay of Fundy, between New Brunswick and Nova Scotia, has the highest tidal range in the world, with a maximum of 16 metres (52.5 ft) and a mean of 11.7 metres (38.4 ft). In addition, because of tidal resonance in the funnel-shaped bay, the tides that flow through the channel are very powerful, so the bay's criteria serve both the "Current-fjord" and "Tide-fjord" translations of Straumfjörð. Julius E. Olson (1911) pointed out that Fridtjof Nansen, taking a very sceptical stance, was dismissive of the idea of Vinland being located at Nova Scotia, partly because he held that the birdlife there would not match the extreme abundance which the saga describes on Straumsey. Olson points, however, to the Bay of Fundy and the isle of Grand Manan, and quotes Samuel de Champlain's observation of birds on islands by the Nova Scotia coast (in Original Narratives):

At the two other [islands off the coast] there is such an abundance of different sorts of birds that one could not imagine it, if he had not seen them

William Henry Babcock (1935) placed Straumfjörð on the firth leading into Passamaquoddy Bay, referring to the tides around the Bay of Fundy, and also places Straumsey at Grand Manan Island.

The Bay of Fundy was also mentioned in a 2008 article in Weather, but without any conclusions being drawn.

=== Environs of Mount Desert Island ===
William L. Traxel, in his explorative 2004 book Footprints of the Welsh Indians: Settlers in North America Before 1492 connects Straumsey to Mount Desert Island in Acadia National Park, Maine, United States, and consequently Straumfjörð with one of the nearby inlets:

Although proof is lacking, from the descriptions given I suspect that Straumsfjord is a fjord in Maine.

He bases this on an identification of Cape Breton Island as Kjalarnes north of Straumfjörð, and on three candidate locations of Hóp to the south. Traxel refers to a number of archeological findings by Frederick J. Pohl at Follins Pond, and connects these to the settlement of Hóp. He also reports that Robert Ellis Cahill found a Norse longhouse near Buzzard's Bay. He also holds Pettaquamscutt River, Rhode Island as a candidate for the location of Hóp.

=== Buzzards Bay ===
According to the 1880 Sephton translation of the saga, Carl Christian Rafn and other Danish scholars placed Kjalarnes at Cape Cod, Straumfjörð at Buzzards Bay, Massachusetts and Straumsey at Martha's Vineyard.

Rafn suggests these views in a comprehensive treatment in the 1840-1841 Annals for Nordic Ancient Knowledge, observing that the interference of the Gulf Stream by Barnstable would give significant currents in this area. He further identifies Hóp as Mount Hope Bay, Rhode Island, suggesting that the Norse language name may have survived through "the Indians' Mont-Haup". He also mentions a nearby Egg Island as a candidate for Straumsey.

The suggested connection to Buzzard's Bay is reiterated by Benjamin Franklin DeCosta in The Pre-Columbian Discovery of America by the Northmen (3rd ed., 1901)

The methodology of the account of Edward F. Gray, author of Leif Eriksson: Discoverer of America (1930), appears to be particularly favoured in the 1935 review article by William Stetson Merrill. Considering all Vinland sagas as a whole, Gray suggested that it was not Karlsefni, but Leif Ericson who reached Straumfjörð. The currents of Straumfjörð, Gray holds, relates to the currents of Nantucket Sound, and he proceeded past Martha's Vineyard to build his Leifsbudir at Menemsha Pond.

=== Long Island Sound ===
Geoffrey Malcolm Gathorne-Hardy (1921) argued that Straumfjörð is identical with Long Island Sound, with Straumsey "at its eastern extremity", i.e. at Fisher's Island. To put this in context, he held Helluland to refer to Labrador and Newfoundland, Markland to refer to Nova Scotia, Kjalarnes to be at Cape Cod.

This contradicted earlier estimates. William Paton Ker, in a 1922 book review published in The English Historical Review favoured this view before that of Gustav Storm, who placed Vinland in Nova Scotia.

=== Hudson River ===
According to a 1963 article in Sunnudagsblaðið, Charles Michael Boland, the author of the 1961 book They All Discovered America which suggests widespread pre-Columbian trans-oceanic contact, held Straumfjörð to be the Hudson River and Straumsey to be Governors Island.

A December 1965 article in Folk og Land suggests that the Hudson River is Straumfjörð, and that Manhattan Island is Straumsey. Reasons provided are that the name seems apt, that there were excellent natural harbours in this area, such as in the East River and New York Harbor, that this location would be a good base for further exploration, that it is a land of plenty, that the winters on Manhattan Island are relatively cold, and that cliffs, described in the saga, can be found by the Harlem River.
