= Prospect Park =

Prospect Park may refer to:

== Businesses ==
- Prospect Park (production company), entertainment production company
- Prospect Park Productions NZ, theatre company based in Dunedin, New Zealand

== Places ==
=== New Zealand ===
- Prospect Park, New Zealand, a portion of Maori Hill suburb, Dunedin, New Zealand

=== United Kingdom ===
- Prospect Park, Reading, a park in Reading, Berkshire, United Kingdom

=== United States ===
- Prospect Park (Brooklyn)
- Prospect Park (Buffalo, New York)
- Prospect Park, Pasadena, California
- Prospect Park (Holyoke, Massachusetts)
- Prospect Park (Ypsilanti, Michigan) or Pulaski Park
- Prospect Park, Minneapolis
- Prospect Park, Mercer County, New Jersey, a neighborhood in Ewing Township
- Prospect Park, New Jersey, a borough in Passaic County, New Jersey
- Prospect Park (Troy, New York)
- Prospect Park, Cameron County, Pennsylvania
- Prospect Park, Pennsylvania, a borough in Delaware County, Pennsylvania

== See also ==
- Prospect Park station (disambiguation)
- Prospect Park Historic District (disambiguation)
