= Prospekt =

Prospekt may refer to:

- Prospekt (album), an album by Circle
- Prospekt (street), a term for a straight broad street, avenue or boulevard in Russia and other post-Soviet states
- Prospekt (video game), a fan-made sequel in the Half-Life video game series

== See also ==
- Prospect (disambiguation)
- Prospekt's March, an EP by Coldplay
