= House at 88 Prospect Street =

Historic house in Massachusetts, United States

- U.S. National Register of Historic Places
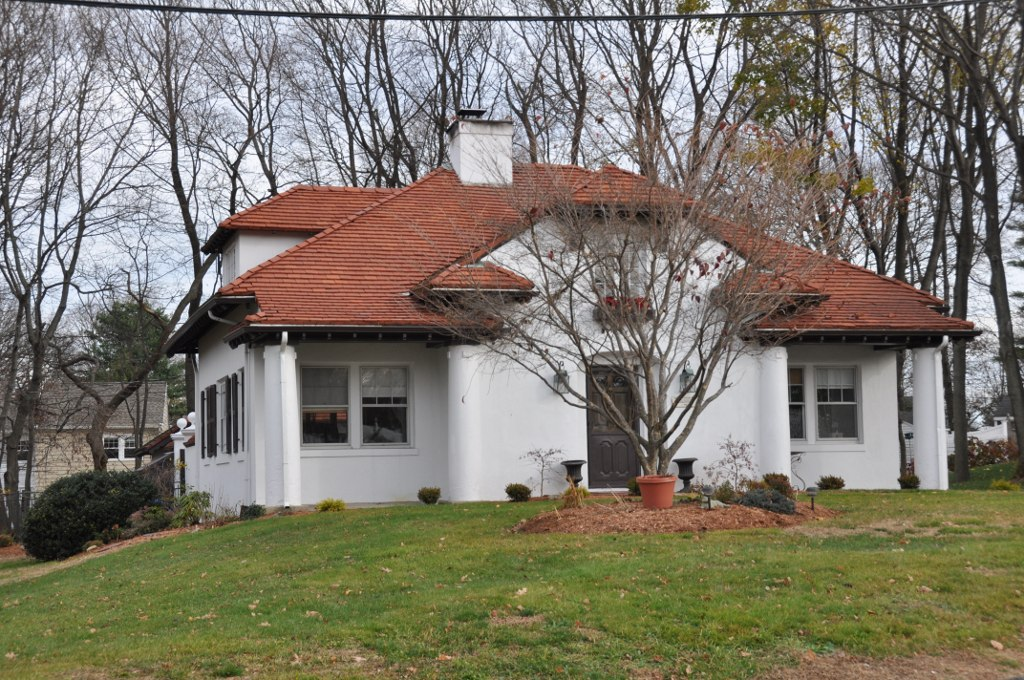

- Location within Massachusetts Location within the United States
- Location: 88 Prospect St., Wakefield, Massachusetts
- Coordinates: 42°30′14″N 71°5′10″W
- Built: 1913
- Architect: Perkins, Harland O.
- Architectural style: English Cottage
- MPS: Wakefield MRA
- NRHP reference No.: 89000737
- Added to NRHP: July 06, 1989

The House at 88 Prospect Street in Wakefield, Massachusetts is one of three houses in the family compound of Elizabeth Boit. Built in 1913, the compound of which this house is a part is the only estate of one of Wakefield's major industrial figures to survive. The house was listed on the National Register of Historic Places in 1989.

== Description and history ==
Elizabeth Boit, co-founder of the Harvard Knitting Mills, was one of the first highly placed female executive in the male-dominated management ranks of textile firms of the turn of the 20th century, and is believed to be the only woman in a top executive position in the United States textile industry in 1923. She pioneered improvements in worker conditions, offering health care to factory workers, and providing bonuses based on company profits. The compound she built at Chestnut and Prospect Streets, on the summit of Cowdry's Hill, is the only surviving estate of Wakefield's leading business executives.

Boit's three houses were all designed by local architect Harland Perkins, and were set in an estate compound on the summit of Cowdry's Hill that included three residences, formal gardens, a playhouse, and greenhouse. All three residences, 88 and 90 Prospect Street, and 127 Chestnut Street (1910–1913), were designed in the English Cottage style. The stucco structures have red tile roofs, recessed entries, exposed purlins, and irregular fenestration. This house is 1 1/2 stories in height, with its entry facing west, set under a cross-gable roof section with a clipped gable. There are recessed porches on either side, supported by heavy columns.

== See also ==
- National Register of Historic Places listings in Wakefield, Massachusetts
- National Register of Historic Places listings in Middlesex County, Massachusetts
