= Prospect Park Historic District =

Prospect Park Historic District may refer to:

in the United States (by state)

- Prospect Park Historic District (Davenport, Iowa)
- Prospect Park Second Plat Historic District. Des Moines, Iowa
- Prospect Park Farm, Chapman, Kansas, listed on the NRHP in Kansas
- Prospect Park (Holyoke, Massachusetts), a park and historic district
- Prospect Park Residential Historic District, Minneapolis, Minnesota
- Prospect Park Water Tower and Tower Hill Park, Minneapolis, Minnesota
- Prospect Park (Brooklyn), New York, a park and historic district
- Prospect Park South Historic District, Brooklyn, New York
