= Prospect High School =

Prospect High School may refer to:

- Prospect High School (Saratoga, California)
- Prospect High School (Illinois)
- Prospect Charter School, Prospect, Oregon
- Prospect High School (Oroville, California)
- Prospect High School (Launceston, Tasmania)
