= Prospect Park Productions NZ =

Theatre production company in New Zealand

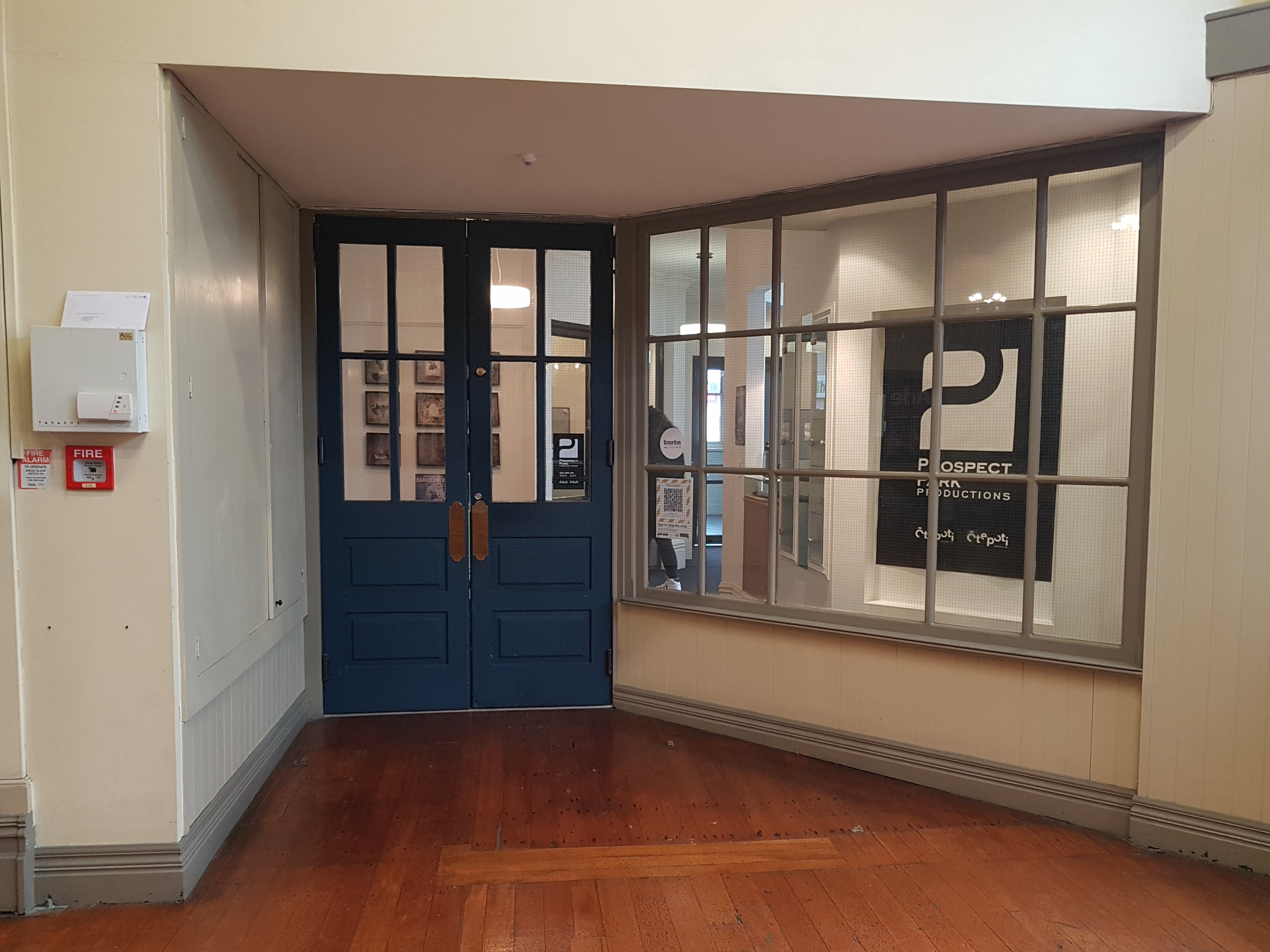
- Office entrance
- Formation: 2016
- Type: Theatre group
- Purpose: Producing theatre
- Location: Dunedin, New Zealand
- Members: H-J Kilkelly, Emily Duncan
- Website: https://www.prospectpark.co.nz

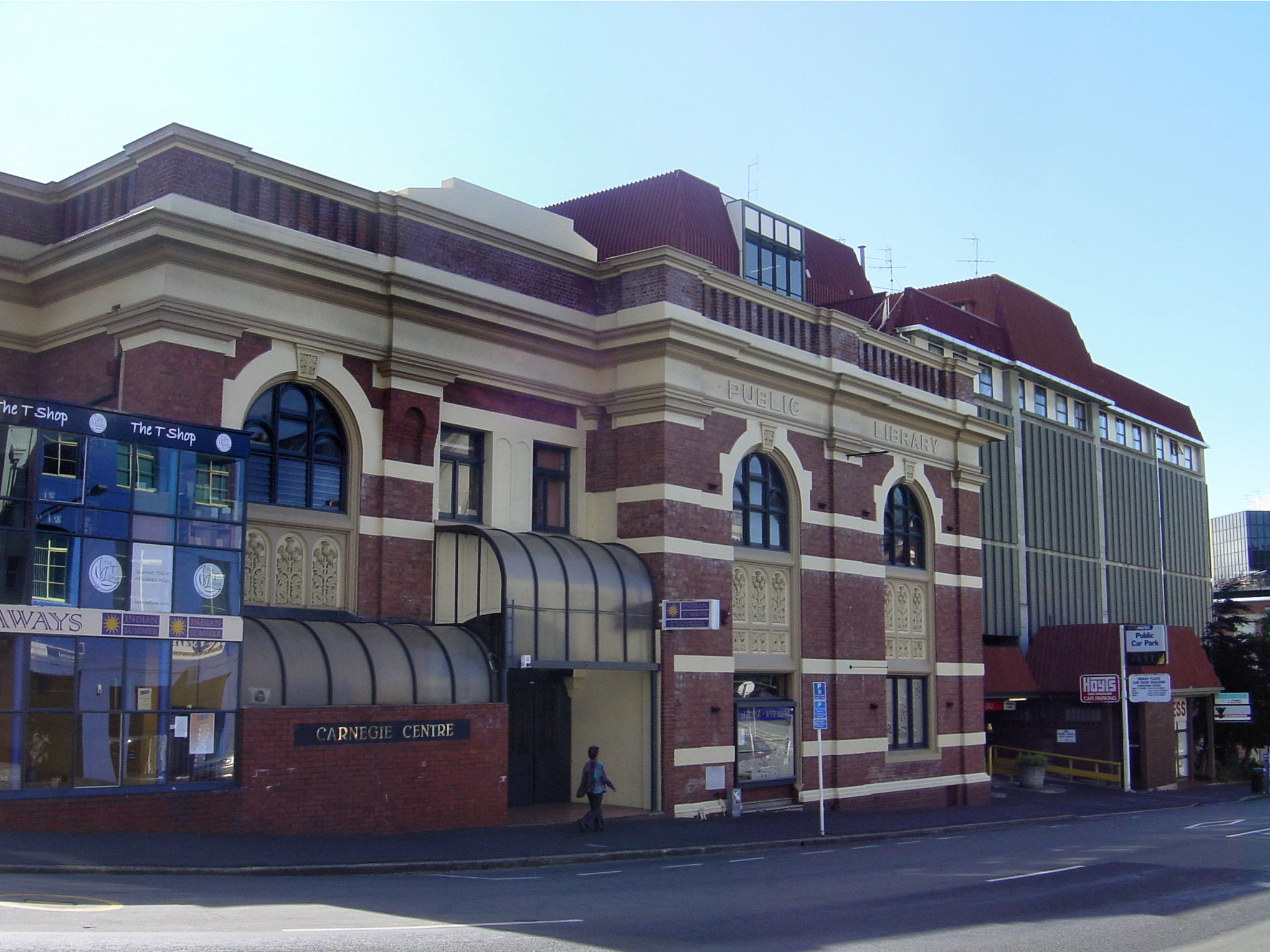
Carnegie Centre, headquarters of Prospect Park Productions

Prospect Park is a theatre production company in New Zealand. It was formed in 2016 by Emily Duncan and H-J Kilkelly to foster new professional theatre-based work in the region. Duncan is a playwright and director and Kilkelly is a producer, both are from Dunedin.

After the Fortune Theatre in Dunedin closed it left a gap with the loss of its development programme for emerging playwrights and theatre makers called the 4X4 Programme. Prospect Park picked up this idea and started both the Ōtepoti Theatre Lab and the Ōtepoti Writers Lab.

== Works ==
- Hold Me by Emily Duncan produced by Prospect Park
- Shaken by Emily Duncan produced by Prospect Park
- Eloise in the Middle by Emily Duncan produced by Prospect Park
- Dark Dunedin (2018) is a podcast series written by Emily Duncan produced by Prospect Park with support from Otago Access Radio, Creative NZ, Creative Communities (Dunedin), the Dunedin Fringe Festival 2018, New Athenaeum Theatre, Olveston Historic Home, Archive Birds NZ, and Dunedin UNESCO City of Literature.
- Le Sujet Parle: And Then He Shot Me (2019) by Emily Duncan. Premiere - Dunedin Fringe Festival at Otago Museum.
- Thief (2021) - Written and performed by Kelly Hocking, Dunedin Fringe Festival at the Emerson's Festival Theatre, 20 Princes St. Initially programmed for 2020 but cancelled due to the lockdown brought by COVID-19. Hocking developed the play through Prospect Park's Ōtepoti Theatre Lab.
- The World's First Lovers - premiered 2023 at the Kia Mau Festival, written by Jessica Latton and directed by Juanita Hepi.
