= Prospect Park station =

Prospect Park station may refer to:

- Prospect Park station (Metro Transit), a station on the METRO Green Line, Minneapolis-St. Paul, Minnesota
- Prospect Park station (BMT lines), a station on the BMT Brighton and Fulton Street Lines of the New York City Subway
- Prospect Park station (SEPTA), a station on the SEPTA Wilmington/Newark Line, Philadelphia, Pennsylvania

== See also ==
- 15th Street–Prospect Park station, a station on the IND Culver Line of the New York City Subway
