= Prospect Park Second Plat Historic District =

Historic district in Iowa, United States

- U.S. National Register of Historic Places
- U.S. Historic district
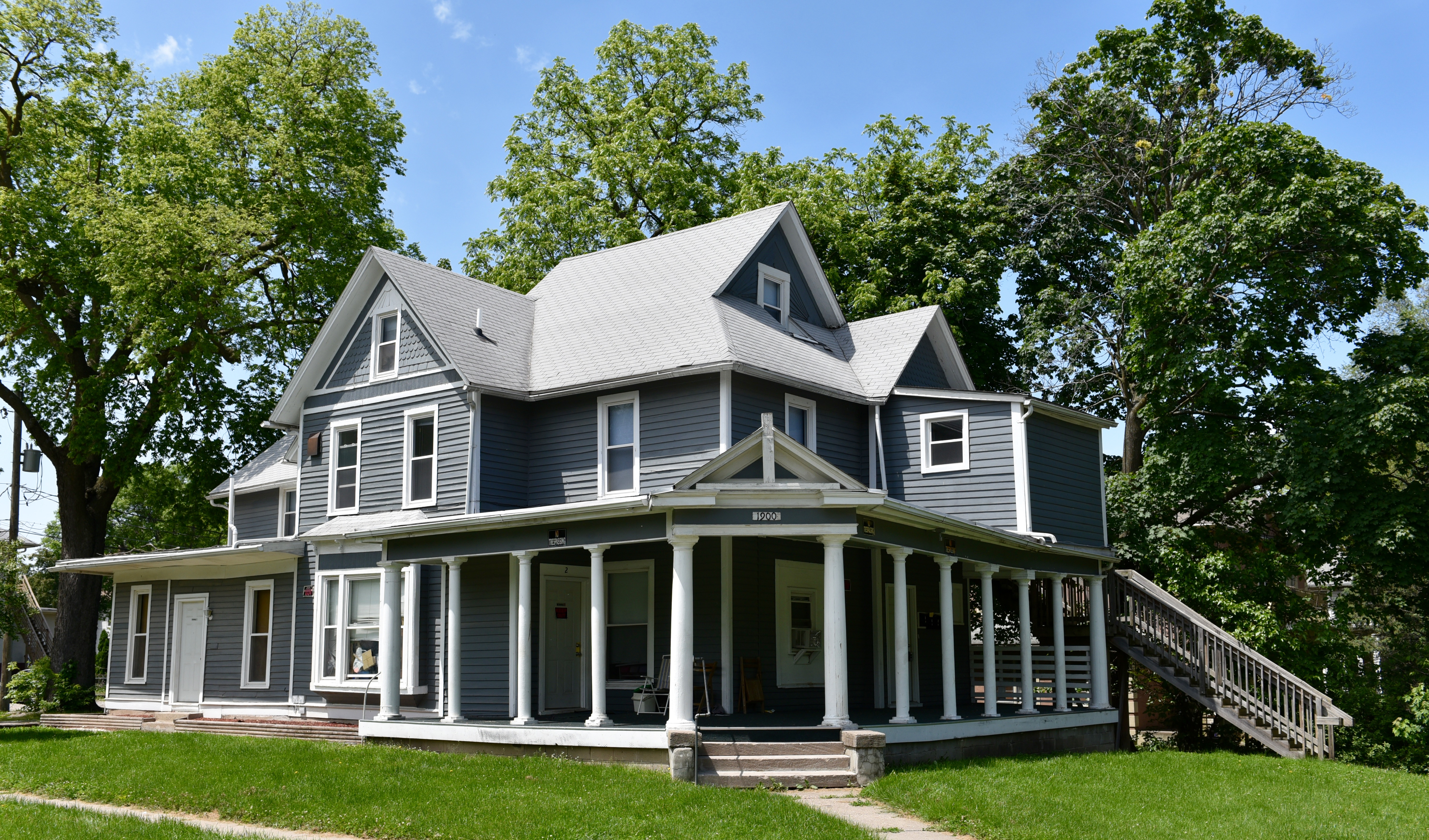

- Location within Iowa Location within the United States
- Location: Roughly from the Des Moines River south to Franklin Ave., between 6th Ave. and 9th St. Des Moines, Iowa
- Coordinates: 41°36′45″N 93°37′39″W
- Area: 23 acres (9.3 ha)
- Architectural style: Late 19th And 20th Century Revivals; Late 19th and early 20th century American movements Late Victorian
- MPS: Towards a Greater Des Moines MPS
- NRHP reference No.: 98000375
- Added to NRHP: April 23, 1998

The Prospect Park Second Plat Historic District is a nationally recognized historic district located in the north-central section of Des Moines, Iowa, United States. The residential area contained middle to upper class housing that was developed in the late 19th and early 20th centuries in the suburb of North Des Moines. It has been listed on the National Register of Historic Places since 1998. It is part of the Towards a Greater Des Moines MPS.

== History ==
The first section of this historic district is known as Official Plat of Government Lot 2 and it was laid out in 1886 (140 years ago). Prospect Park Second Plat was laid out the following year and it was corrected in 1888. The final section, Glen Baily Plat, was laid out in 1922. The period of historical significance ends in 1937 when Hickman Road was cut through to Sixth Avenue.

There are three distinct sections in the historic district. The area north of Hickman Road along the Des Moines River contains larger lots that offer panoramic views of the river valley below. This is where the upper-income residents lived. The area south of Hickman Road between Seventh and Ninth Streets contained more modest sized lots without river views. The street car line on Sixth Avenue encouraged development in the years prior to the large-scale use of the automobile. Initially, the area along Sixth Street was developed into single-family homes. Glen Baily redeveloped it as rental properties when he built a complex of seven apartment buildings in the 1920s.

The district is also associated with several real estate practices that significantly influenced the development of North Des Moines during this time period. These practices include the introduction of residential parks as a new kind of residential area; subdividing large tracts of land for piece-meal development; the rise of real estate companies to finance large ventures; and new marketing techniques.

== Architecture ==
The middle- and upper-middle-class houses in the district provide a variety of different architectural styles that were popular in Des Moines in the late 19th and early 20th centuries. Several houses in the district were featured in local publications during this time period and may have helped in popularizing the various styles. Several Des Moines architects, including Norman T. Vorse, Kraetsch & Kraetsch and Hallett & Rawson, had designed houses that were built in the district. Most of these houses are the larger residences north of Hickman Road along the river. Landscape architecture was another element of the development of the Prospect Park Second Plat. It contains the characteristics of the residential park-natural terrain, parkland, curvilinear streets and parkway-like amenities. It provides a transition between the traditionally laid out city block in the south and the irregular streets on the north side.

The Queen Anne style was prominent in the early development of Prospect Park Second Plat. They are found along Franklin Avenue from the Des Moines River to the southern border of the district. The Colonial Revival style developed soon after. Several examples of this style are found in the more modest sized houses along Ninth Street. A larger and more upscale version of this style is found at 1908 Seventh Street. There are also several examples of the American Four Square style. They are found throughout the southern part of the historic district. The American Craftsman style is found in both large and small houses. The larger examples were built north of Hickman Road. The smaller houses are located along the north–south streets.

A couple of architectural styles have only one example in the district. The F. A. Kern House at 717 Franklin Avenue is an example of the Prairie School style. There is another house of the same style and on the same street, but located in The Oaklands Historic District. There is also a single example of the Mission Revival style on Seventh Street.
