= Peggy Bernier =

American comedian and actress (1907–2001)

- Born: March 19, 1907; Providence, Rhode Island, U.S.
- Died: March 5, 2001 (aged 93)
- Occupations: Comedian, actress
- Years active: 1926–38
- Spouse: Milton Watson

Peggy Bernier (19 March 1907 – 5 March 2001) was an American comedian and film actress who was popular in the 1920s and 1930s.

== Stage comedian ==
Bernier was born in 1907 in Providence, Rhode Island but she spent her childhood in Newton, Massachusetts. Her father was a French Canadian immigrant who worked in the worsted mills, her mother was an Irish immigrant. Peggy excelled in school and won many amateur theatrical contests. Her first engagement came in 1922, when she and her mother approached George M. Cohan and begged her a small part in Little Nelly Kelly which was then in tryouts in Boston. According to Bernier, this landed her a part in the show at age 15 but this story may be apocryphal as her name does not appear on any cast lists for this play. She spent several years living with a cousin in New York City. At the age 17, she landed a job in the chorus of Al Jolson's 1925 musical Big Boy. The show disbanded in Chicago, Illinois when Jolson became ill. Temporarily stranded in Chicago, she began performing her Jolson impersonation in cafes and clubs. Paul Ash and his wife caught her act. Ash offered her an engagement. Bernier accompanied Ash, was a success with him, and later in California.

Bernier was with the Rubeville Follies, produced by Jack Partington, in August 1926. She appeared at the Metropolitan Theater in Los Angeles, California. She was billed as "Al Jolson's world's worst voice girl". In November she was in the cast of Actors' Night In Coffee Dan's, which included a unique stage setting and new numbers sung by Bernier. In 1928 she appeared in the Chicago production of Good News as Flo, the Varsity Drag Girl. She received many rave notices for this show and the show ran at the Selwyn Theater for over a year. She continued to tour with Paul Ash for three years. Peggy recorded several songs from Good News as well, such as "Me Too" which was a hit on the college charts and contains licks taught to her by her then boyfriend Bing Crosby.

Bernier was on stage at the Paramount Theater in June 1929. The following week she began rehearsing for a musical show entitled Me For You (later re-titled Heads Up!). It had an original musical comedy libretto written by Owen Davis, with lyrics by Richard Rodgers and Lorenz Hart. The show played the Alvin Theatre on Broadway after being presented in Detroit, Michigan and Philadelphia, Pennsylvania. Bernier was joined in the cast by Jack Whiting, Betty Compton, and Gordon King. The producers were Alexander Aarons and Vinton Freedley. Heads Up! was about the daughter of a bootlegger. Every character in the play appeared to be involved in the moonshine business.

In January 1931, Bernier replaced Frances Upton in You Said It, which was then trying out in Philadelphia, Pennsylvania. The comedy opened in New York at Chanin's 46th Street Theater with Jack Yellen and Lou Holtz as producers. Holtz performed the featured role as the old undergraduate. Bernier was among the supporting actors, as were Lyda Roberti and George Haggerty. The comedy's libretto was authored by Yellen and Sid Silvers.

When Children of Divorce (1927) played the Metropolitan Theater, Bernier was in the variety entertainment which accompanied the screening of the Clara Bow and Gary Cooper movie. Bernier sang hit songs with Eddie Peabody who presented an exciting jazz divertissement, Piano Mania. Bernier and Peabody combined for similar stage shows at other premieres. Some of the titles include Way Out West and Opera vs. Jazz In May 1927 Bernier sang "Crazy Words". The song mentions Napoleon Bonaparte, Mark Antony, Admiral Perry, and others.

== Movies ==
She was in The Hit Parade (1937), a motion picture which starred Frances Langford and Phil Regan. Bernier played in One On The Aisle (1930) and has an uncredited role in Rebellious Daughters (1938).

== Marriage ==
Bernier married Milton Watson, singer who appeared with the Marx Brothers in Animal Crackers, played opposite Ethel Merman in Annie Get Your Gun and was Curly in Oklahoma. Watson was also the featured vocalist in one of Mae West's later reviews. Watson was also discovered by Ash when he was studying to become a school teacher in California.
