= Carter's Ink Company =

Manufacturer in Massachusetts, 1858–1975

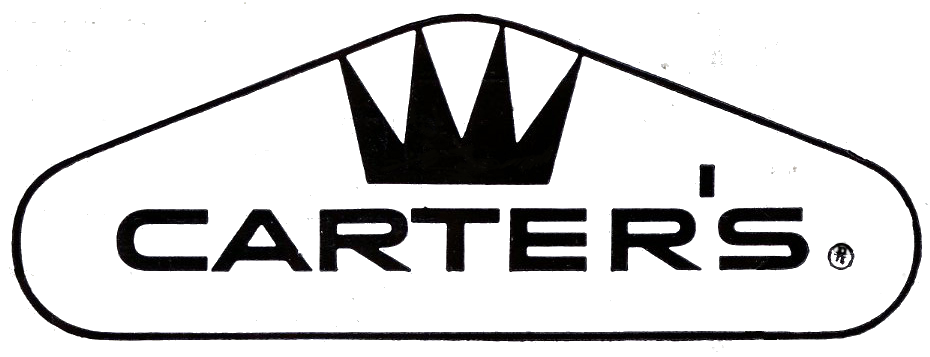

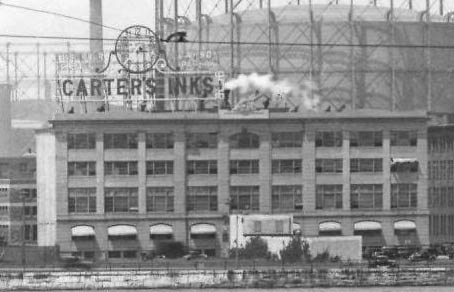
- The Carter's Inks building in Cambridge, July 1933
- Formerly: The William Carter Company
- Type: Private
- Industry: Stationery
- Founded: 1858 in Boston, Massachusetts, U.S.
- Founder: William Carter
- Defunct: 1975; 51 years ago
- Fate: Acquired by Dennison Manufacturing Company, then later Avery-Dennison. Became a brand
- Headquarters: Cambridge, Massachusetts, U.S.
- Products: Ink, fountain pens, mechanical pencils

Carter's Ink Company was an American manufacturer of ink and related products, based first in Boston and later in Cambridge, Massachusetts. It was once the largest ink manufacturer in the world.

Apart from ink, Carter produced a line of fountain pens during a brief period in the 1920s. Some collectors regard those pens as items of a fine quality. Later, the company was acquired by Avery-Dennison. Nowadays, Avery commercialises rubber stamps under the Carter brand.

== History ==
The William Carter Company, the forerunner of Carter's Ink, was founded in 1858 by Boston stationer William Carter who, in order to supplement his paper sales, had started repackaging other companies' inks and selling them under his own name. In 1860, William Carter's brother, Edward Carter, joined the company and the firm became known as "William Carter and Bro."

The Civil War disrupted Carter's primary ink supplier, so William Carter obtained the use of its formulas on a royalty basis and started making his own inks and mucilage, which necessitated the move to a larger building. Another brother, John H. Carter, joined the company, which became "William Carter & Bros."

=== Development and final years ===
In 1865 William's cousin, John W. Carter, joined the enterprise and the name became "Carter Bros. & Company." John W. Carter focused his efforts on the ink part of the business which, along with the sales efforts of James P. Dinsmore, resulted in such growth that the ink business was separated from the paper business and moved into its own quarters in 1868." The entire firm and both of its divisions and their separate buildings were destroyed the night of November 9, 1872, in what has been called the Great Boston Fire of 1872. All that was left was the company's good will and its formulas.

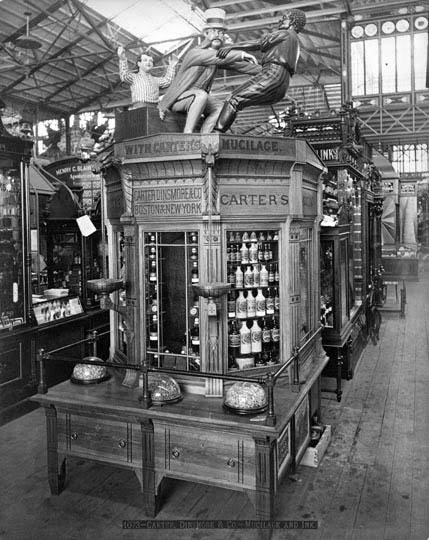
Carter's ink display pictured in 1873

After the fire in 1872, John W. Carter teamed up with James P. Dinsmore to buy the ink division and start a new firm known as "Carter, Dinsmore and Company." The new company thrived and by 1884 had become the largest ink producer in the world. Contributing to this growth was John W. Carter's belief in and commitment to research to develop new and better inks.

James P. Dinsmore retired in 1888, and John W. Carter drowned in 1895, which created an organizational crisis in the unincorporated enterprise, which led to its incorporation later that year as "The Carter's Ink Company.

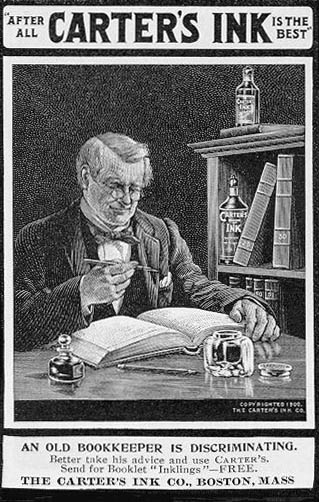
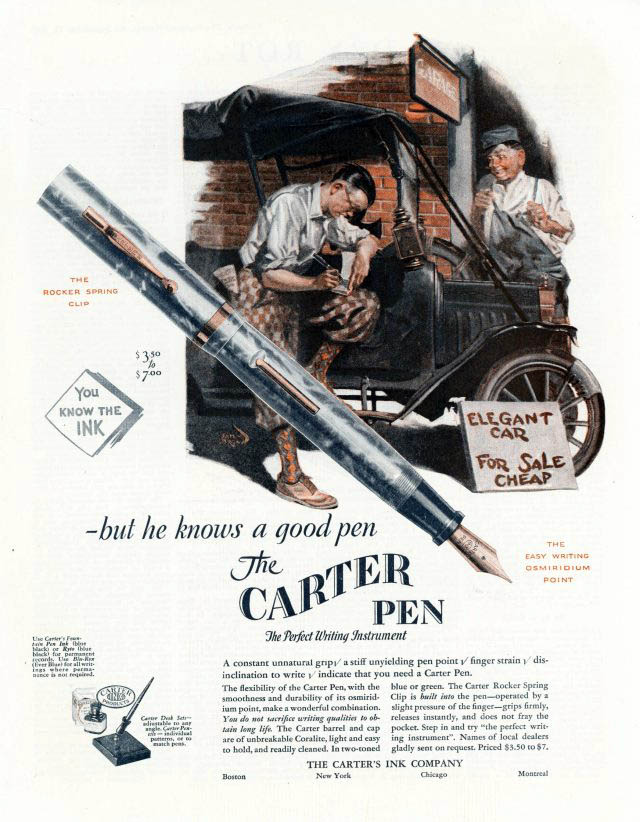
Two Carter's advertisements, promoting company's ink on Harper's Magazine (left, in 1901), and fountain pen (right, 1927)

At the time of John W. Carter's death, his son, Richard B. Carter was still studying at Harvard, but after his graduation in 1898, he joined the company. After a period of learning the business, he became its head in 1903.

Under Richard Carter's leadership the company outgrew its Boston location. In 1909 a new factory was built in Cambridge and occupied in 1910. The building's huge "Carter's Inks" electric sign faced the Charles River and was an area landmark for many years. Richard Carter continued his father's commitment to research and development of inks, glues and related products.

In the mid-1920s, when upmarket fountain pens were a popular luxury item, Carter began its own range of pens, more specifically in 1926. The line was discontinued in the early 1930s, but they are still fondly remembered and sought after by collectors. Carter's also manufactured mechanical pencils, as well as desk pen sets. Samuel D. Wonders was elected president of the company in 1949 and served until 1955.

Francis J. Honn invented the highlighting marker (under the trademark Hi-Liter) as the Vice President of Technology at Carter's in 1963.

In 1975 the company was sold to Dennison Manufacturing Company, now Avery Dennison. Samuel D. Wonders was followed by Nathan C. Hubley, Jr who retired as president in 1976 when the company was sold to Dennison. To help with the transition, he remained with Dennison as vice president until 1977.

=== Post acquisition ===
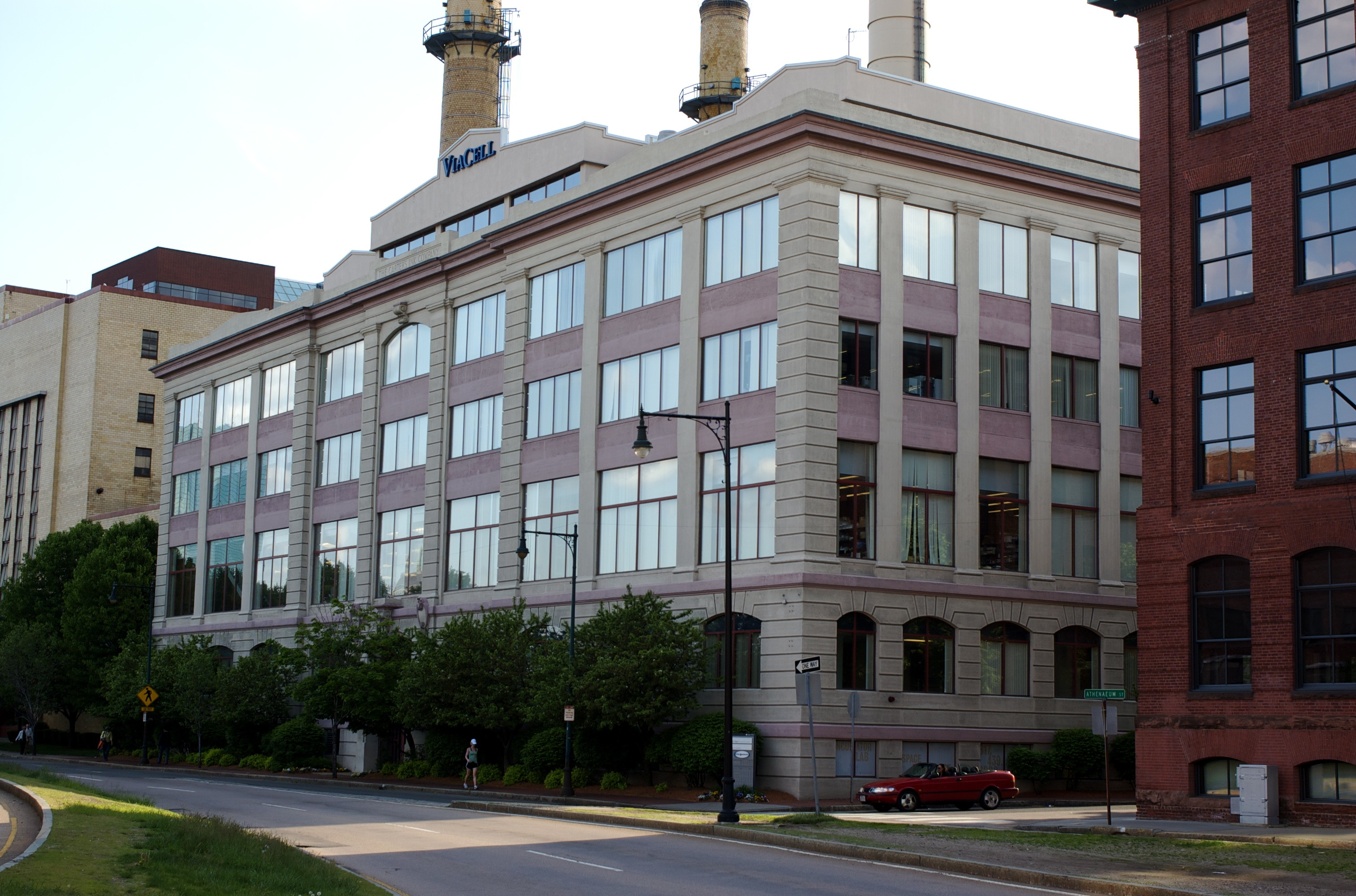
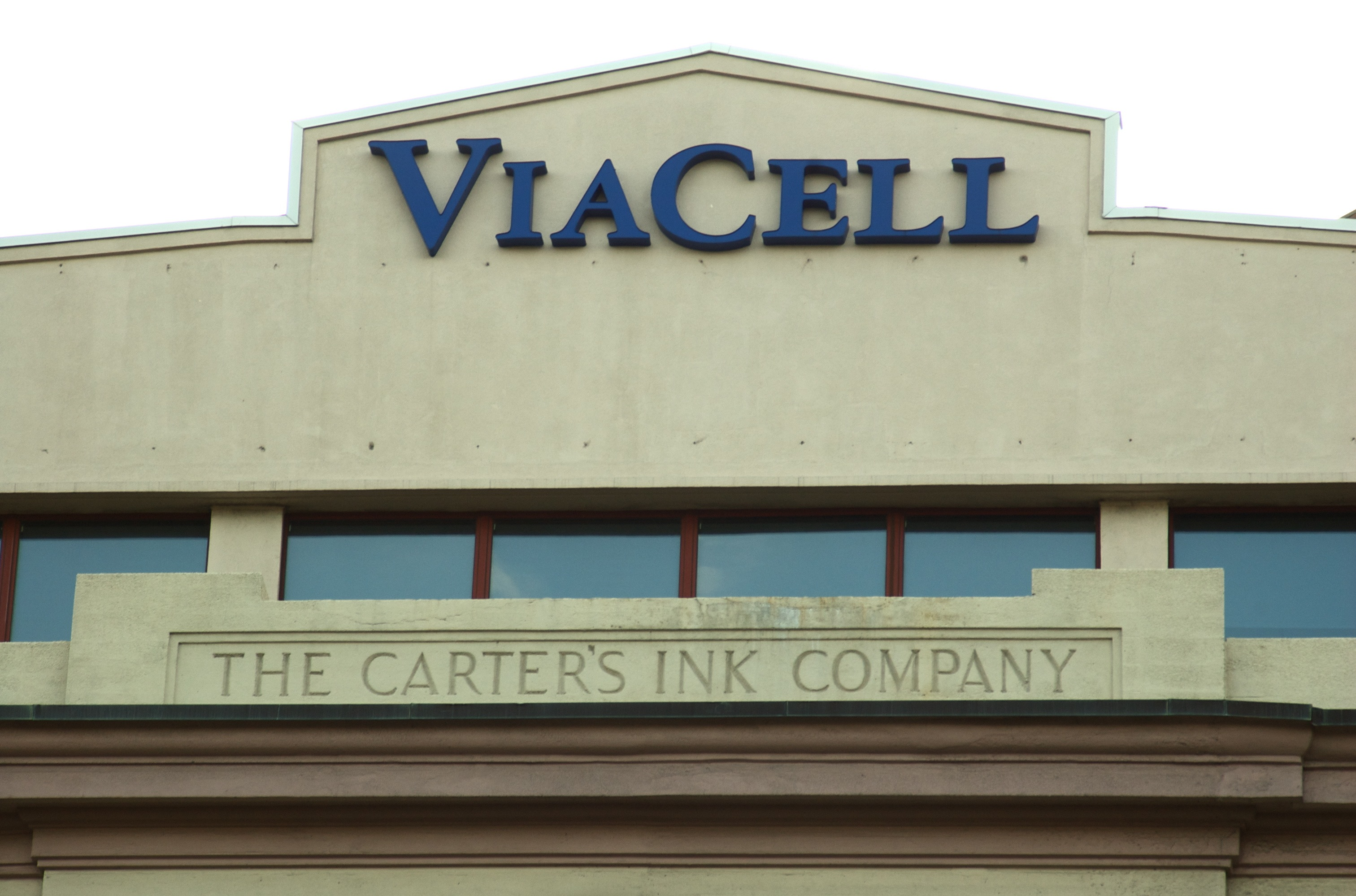
(Left): The old Carter's Ink Company building at 245 First St. in Cambridge, and sign identifying the building as "The Carter's Ink Company", 2009

After acquiring Carter's Ink Company in 1975, Dennison made the business decision to discard all of Carter's records from the 1860s on, including all of Carter's meticulous ink research records. The Carter name is still used by Avery-Dennison on some ink-related products such as rubber stamps.

The Carter's Ink building in Cambridge still stands but has been adapted to other uses. In the summer of 1984, the Thinking Machines Corporation (the market leader in parallel computing by then) moved its headquarters to top floors in the building. Five years later, TMC signed a ten-year lease with the building, for US$6 million a year.

In 1995 Open Market moved into the building.

In 2004, the building was converted to include 130,000 square feet of lab space to accommodate acquisition by ViaCell, a cellular medicine research company later acquired by PerkinElmer.

Nowadays, the former Carter's building is occupied by The Forsyth Institute, one of the leading centers for dental and craniofacial research in the world and affiliated to the Harvard School of Dental Medicine.
