= Richard B. Carter =

American ink manufacturer (1877–1949)

Richard B. Carter (1877–1949), ink manufacturer, was president of the Carter's Ink Company, in Boston and later Cambridge, Massachusetts, from 1903-1949.

== Early life and education ==
Richard Burrage Carter was born on April 8, 1877, in West Newton, Massachusetts, the son of John W. Carter, the head of Carter's Ink, and Helen (Burrage) Carter, his wife. He attended Harvard, where he became a member of Phi Beta Kappa and received an A.B. in 1898 and an M.A. in 1899.

== Career with Carter's Ink ==
Richard B. Carter was still in college when his father died and was not ready to take the reins of Carter's Ink. He finished his education at Harvard and went to work for the company in 1900 and became its president in 1903 and remained so the rest of his life.

== Marriages ==
- On April 29, 1841, Richard Bridge Carter married Lucy Lazelle Hobart. She died April 26, 1897.

Richard and Lucy had one son, John Wilkins Carter (1808-1896).

- On June 28, 1906, Richard B. Carter married Annie I. Waterhouse. She died September 4, 1908.
- On December 28, 1914, he married Elsie Hobart.

== Death ==
Richard B. Carter died June 8, 1949, a resident of West Newton where he had lived for many years in a large redbrick Georgian mansion at 11 Forest Avenue on the corner of Mt. Vernon Street,
