= Bijan Olia =

American composer and songwriter

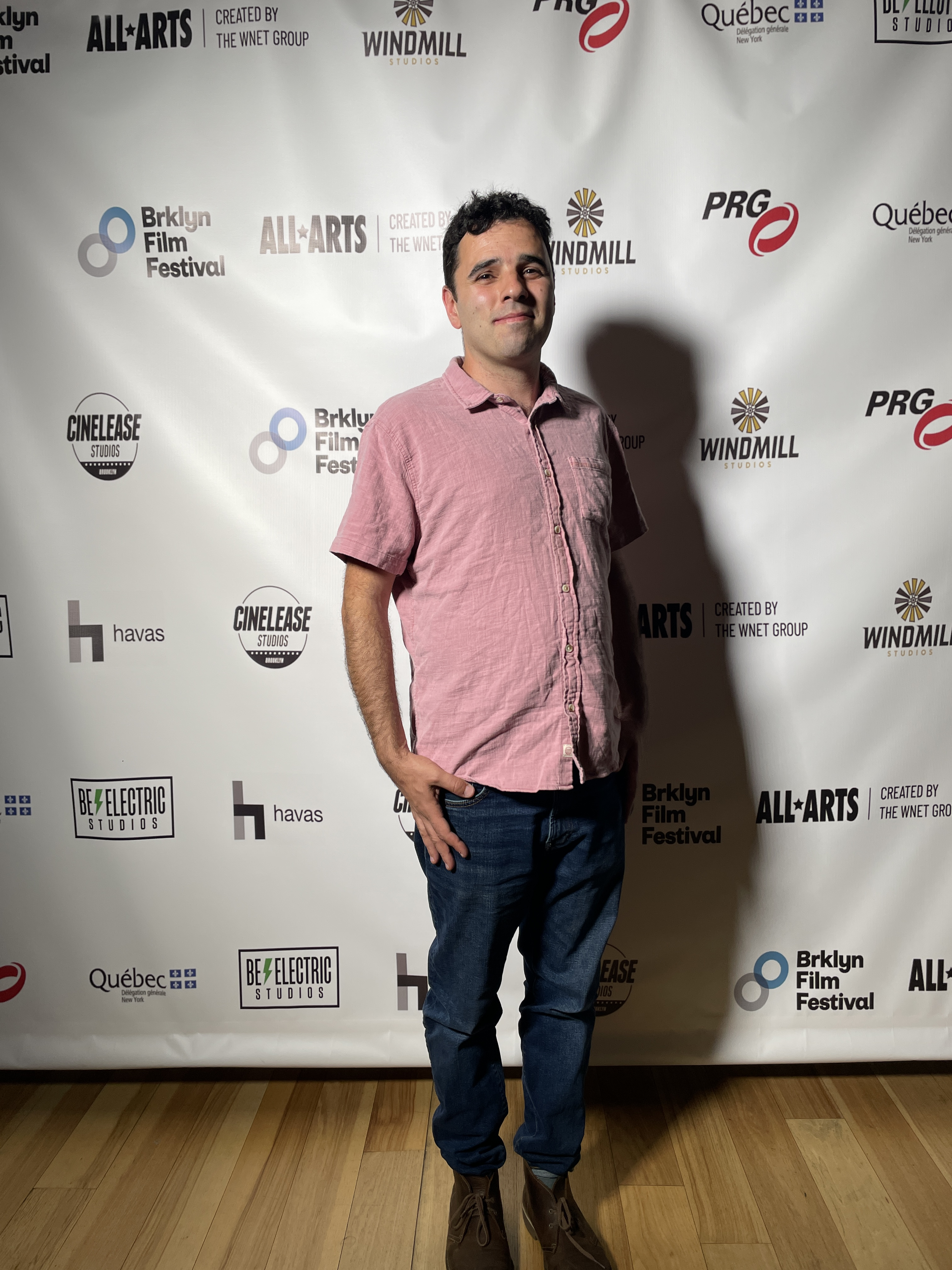
- Born: Boston, Massachusetts, U.S.
- Occupations: Composer; songwriter
- Website: http://www.bijanolia.com

Bijan Olia is an Iranian-American composer and songwriter based in Los Angeles.

== Early life and education ==
Olia was born in Boston, Massachusetts to an Iranian father and an Italian-American mother. He grew up in Newton, Massachusetts and studied piano at the All Newton Music School. He is a 2007 graduate of Newton South High School.

Olia attended the Peabody Conservatory of the Johns Hopkins University where he majored in computer music, composition and minored in piano performance. During his last year at Peabody, Olia interned for Dan Deacon, where he arranged and performed piano on Deacon’s America album.

After completing the 2012 BMI Composing for the Screen Workshop in New York City, Olia moved to Los Angeles.

== Career ==
=== Film and television ===
Olia's film credits include scores to Better Half, Miracles Happen Elsewhere, and songs featured in 80 for Brady and FOX’s Animal Control. He has written additional music for Freeform's Siren, Warner Brothers' Lego DC Super Hero Girls: Brain Drain, and Netflix’s The Lost Pirate Kingdom.

=== Concert music ===
Olia's concert works include his piano quartet with toy piano and melodica, Streicher, Tasti et Bizarreries, which premiered at the Will Geer Theatricum Botanicum’s Oak Tree Group concert series in 2018. It was also performed at the K17 Concert Series in 2019.

His piano 4 hands piece, Mano a Mano a Mano a Mano, has been performed at the Under the Oaks concert series as well as Los Angeles' Artistic Soirées.

=== Songs ===
As a songwriter, Olia has worked with Grammy award-winning singer/songwriter J. Hoard and co-founded, Foam Collective, a songwriting and record production team. Foam Collective released their first EP in July of 2023, titled Light and Soul. The music of Foam Collective draws from multiple styles including lo-fi, R&B, and jazz.

== Awards and honors ==
- Fellow for the 2017 Sundance Institute Composers Lab
- Fellow for the 2023 Composer Filmmakers Accelerator at the Vancouver International Film Festival
- 2024 Nominee for the Music + Sound Awards for Best Original Composition in Film + Television Programme Titles for Better Half
- 2018 Winner for the MPSE Golden Reel Awards Outstanding Achievement in Sound Editing - Sound Effects, Foley, Music, Dialogue and ADR for Non-Theatrical Animated Long Form Broadcast Media
