= Elizabeth Boit House =

Historic house in Massachusetts, United States

- U.S. National Register of Historic Places
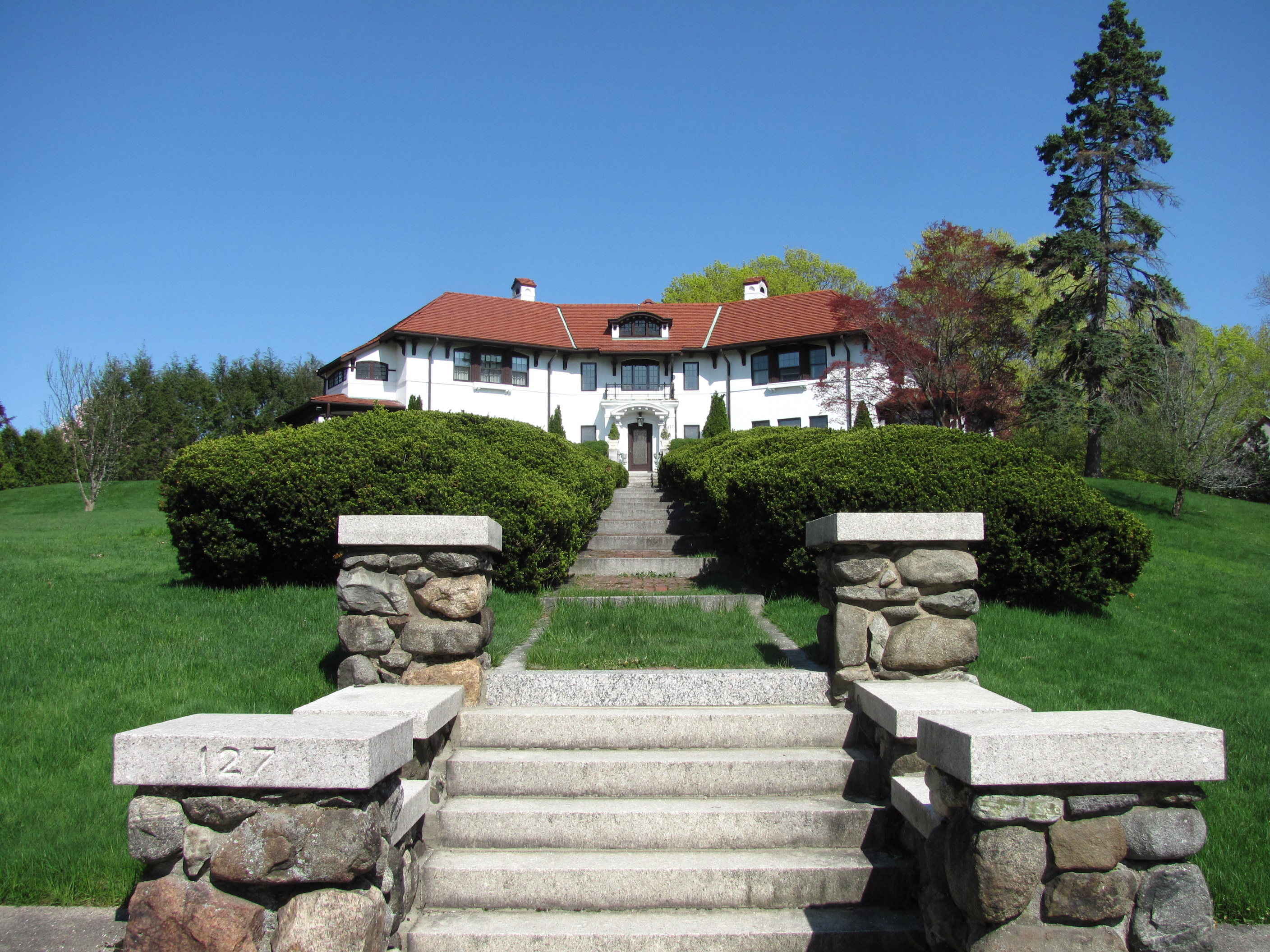
- Elizabeth Boit House

- Location within Massachusetts Location within the United States
- Location: 127 Chestnut St., Wakefield, Massachusetts
- Coordinates: 42°30′11″N 71°5′11″W
- Built: 1911
- Architect: Perkins, Harland O.
- Architectural style: English Cottage
- MPS: Wakefield MRA
- NRHP reference No.: 89000720
- Added to NRHP: July 06, 1989

The Elizabeth Boit House is a historic house at 127 Chestnut Street in Wakefield, Massachusetts.

Elizabeth Boit, co-founder of the Harvard Knitting Mills, also built on the west side, creating an estate compound on the summit of Cowdry's Hill that included three residences, formal gardens, a playhouse, and greenhouse. All three residences, 88 and 90 Prospect Street, and 127 Chestnut Street (1910-1913), were designed in the English Cottage style by Wakefield architect Harland Perkins. The stucco structures have red tile roofs, recessed entries, exposed purlins, and irregular fenestration. This, the main house is 2 1/2 stories in height, with an angled three-part layout, and is oriented toward the courtyard formed by the three buildings.

This house was listed on the National Register of Historic Places in 1989, for its architecture, and for its association with Elizabeth Boit. She was one of the first highly placed female executives in the male-dominated management ranks of textile firms of the period, and is believed to be the only woman in a top executive position in the United States textile industry in 1923. She pioneered improvements in worker conditions, offering health care to factory workers and providing bonuses based on company profits. The compound she built at Chestnut and Prospect Streets is the only surviving estate of Wakefield's leading business executives. The home was listed for sale on September 16, 2021, for $1,990,000 and sold on November 4, 2021, for $2,750,000 to leading technology and Real Estate entrepreneur Marc Trachtenberg.

== See also ==
- National Register of Historic Places listings in Wakefield, Massachusetts
- National Register of Historic Places listings in Middlesex County, Massachusetts
