= Prospect Avenue =

Prospect Avenue may refer to:

- Prospect Avenue (Kansas City, Missouri), a street that runs close to U.S. Route 71
- Hollywood Boulevard, Los Angeles (named Prospect Avenue between 1887 and 1910)
- Prospect Avenue (Brooklyn), New York City

== New York City Subway stations ==
- Prospect Avenue (IRT White Plains Road Line), in the Bronx; serving the 2 and 5 trains
- Prospect Avenue (BMT Fourth Avenue Line), in Brooklyn; serving the D, N, R, and W trains
