= William Stetson Merrill =

William Stetson Merrill (1866 – 1969) was an American librarian at Newberry Library, who also contributed to the fields of library classification and history. He was the author of A Code for Classifiers in the period 1912 to 1939, and was connected to the American Library Association. He was also a scholar on Vinland.

== A Code for Classifiers ==
Merrill's 1928 book A Code for Classifiers: Principles Governing the Consistent Placing of Books in a System of Classification is still under scrutiny in the field of information studies. It is "essentially a description of the problems in classification arguing the need for a classifier's code, a code that transcended individual classification systems". A second edition was released in 1939.

The Code was intended as an improvement of existing schemes such as Dewey Decimal Classification, Cutter Expansive Classification and James Duff Brown's Subject Classification. Merrill contrasted the art of classifying from the science of classification, and categorized himself as a practical classifier; his interest was the practice of library classification. The 1928 Code includes 300 rules that Merrill had used for classifying materials in the Newberry Library. There are two sections of such rules, for "The One-topic book" and "The Two-topic book." In the 1939 edition, this had increased to 365 rules.

== Vinland ==
Merrill authored several academic articles on the Norse discovery of Vinland, and on the scholarship surrounding these voyages. The article The Vinland Problem Through Four Centuries (1935) is a review of available theories about Thorfinn Karlsefni's voyages in the Saga of Erik the Red.

== Honours ==
Merrill was an honorary member of the Knights of Columbus and the Chicago Library Club.
