= Elizabeth Boit =

American textile manufacturer (1849–1932)

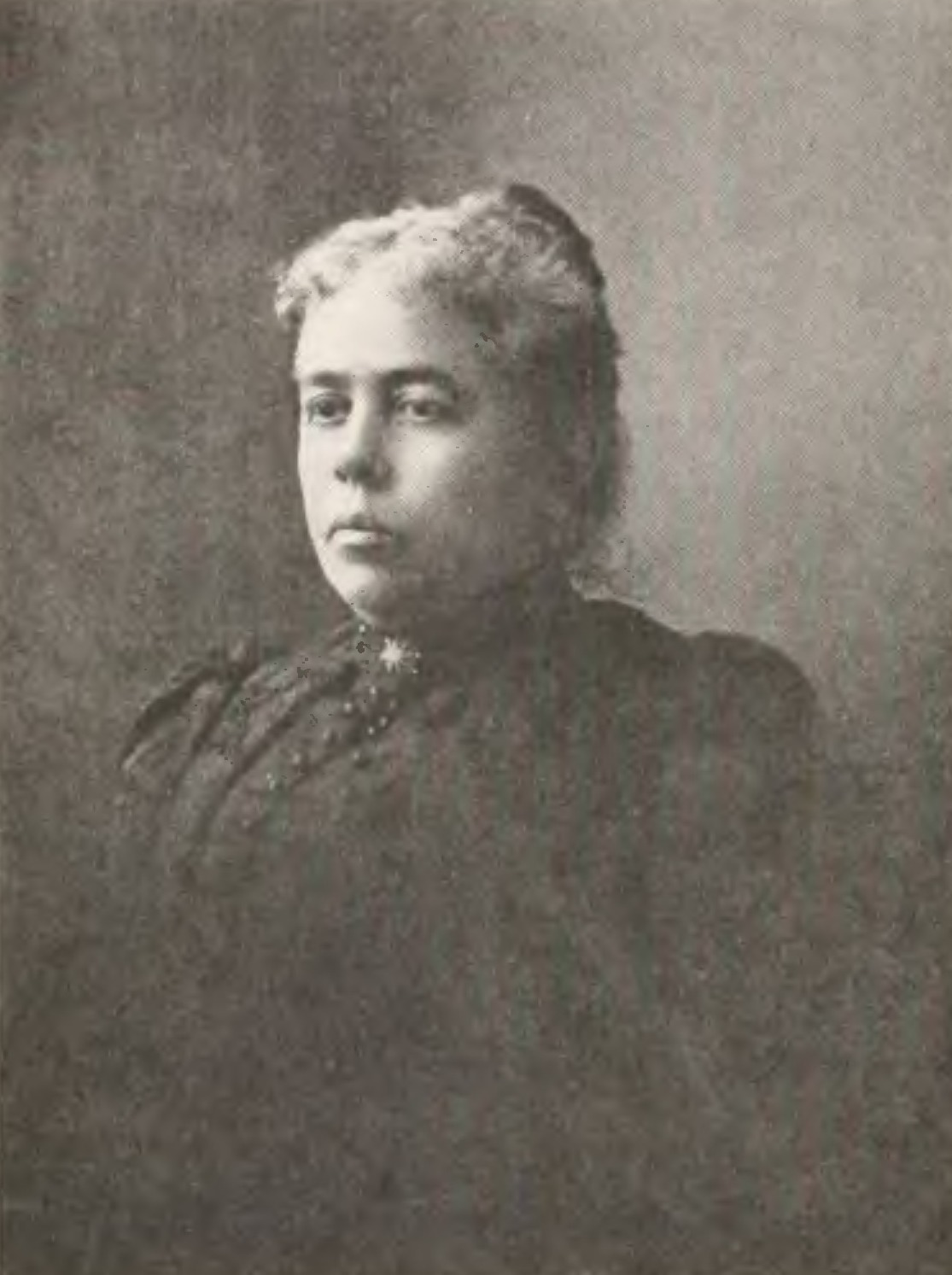
Elizabeth E. Boit

Elizabeth Eaton Boit (1849–1932) was an American textile manufacturer and philanthropist. It was said that "the smartest man in Wakefield (Massachusetts) was a Woman" and this woman was Elizabeth Boit.

== Early life ==
Bolt was born in Newton, Massachusetts on July 9, 1849. She was the second child out of six daughters and went to school at Lasell Seminary. At 18, she was a timekeeper at the Dudley Hosiery Knitting Mill. She became forewoman of the sewing department within five years. Despite an influx of women into the textile industry, a forewoman was a novelty.

== Textile legacy ==
Boit eventually became superintendent of Allston Mills in 1883 when she was 34. She formed a partnership with Charles N. Winship, who was fourteen years her junior, in 1888 and they founded the Harvard Knitting Mill, which specialized in women's undergarments. They moved the business to Wakefield and completed a plant there in 1897. Boit had an incredibly successful plant, having to expand it in 1901, 1903, 1907, and 1911, and at its height occupied a floor space of eight and half acres and employing an estimated 850 employees.

Boit was known for her generosity and set up a profit-sharing program for her employees. At this time, she was the only woman that was actively engaged in such a successful textile business. At its peak, the plant had 850 employees and produced 24,000 garments per day.

She turned over her interest in the business by the 1920s to Charles Winship, though she continued to invest in the mill and visit it daily. Boit never married, instead focusing her life on her mill and her extended family. In her final years, she fell ill and then died on November 14, 1932. Her home, the Elizabeth Boit House, was listed on the National Register of Historic Places in 1989.
