= List of Old Norse exonyms =

Names that speakers of Old Norse assigned to foreign places and peoples

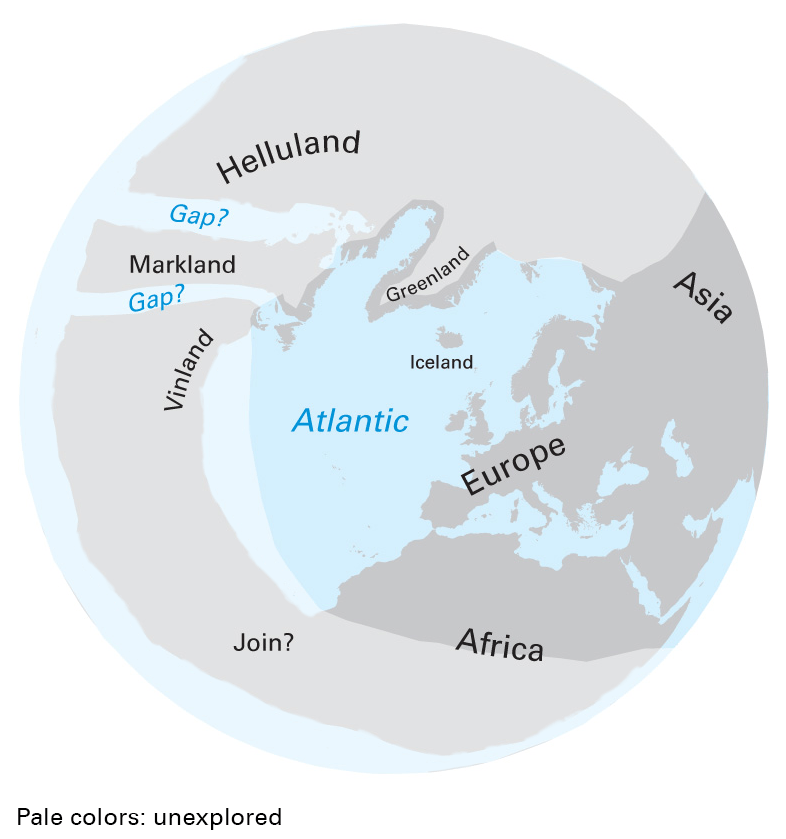
The world known to the Norse.

The Norse people traveled abroad as Vikings and Varangians. As such, they often named the locations and peoples they visited with Old Norse words unrelated to the local endonyms. Some of these names have been acquired from sagas, runestones or Byzantine chronicles.

== List ==
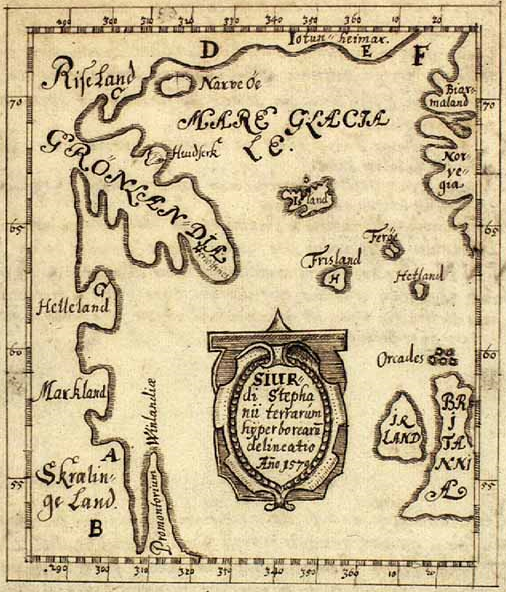
The Skálholt Map showing Latinized Norse placenames in the North Atlantic: Iotun-heimar (Jötunheimr); Riseland (Land of the Risi); Grönlandia (Greenland); Helleland (Helluland); Markland; Skrælinge Land (Land of the Skræling); Promontorium Winlandiæ (Promontory of Vinland)

=== A ===
Apardion
Aberdeen.
Álaborg
A Varangian fort near Aldeigjuborg.
Aldeigjuborg
Staraya Ladoga in Russia. The hypothetical original Finnic name is *Alode-joki ("lowland river").
Aoraisge
"water nymph island", "Erik's island". Eriska, Scotland.
Árheimar
"River home". A capital of the Goths, according to the Hervarar saga.
Austrsker
"East skerry". Auskerry, Orkney
Austrvegr
"East way". The Baltic lands.

=== B ===
Bern
Verona.
Bertangaland
Brittany. Mentioned in the Þiðreks saga.
Bjarmaland
The southern shores of the White Sea and the basin of the Northern Dvina. Many historians assume the terms beorm and bjarm to derive from the Uralic word perm, which refers to "travelling merchants" and represents the Old Permic culture.
Bjarneyjar
"Bear islands". Possibly Disko Island off Greenland.
blakumen or blökumenn
Romanians (Vlachs) or Cumans. Blokumannaland may be the lands south of the Lower Danube.
Bót
Isle of Bute, Scotland.
Βουσεγραδε
Vyshhorod
bretar
Welsh people

=== D ===
Danparstaþir
A river near Árheimar, according to the Hervarar saga. Identified by some as the Dnieper river.
*Dolgrveginn
"Giant-lifted". Proposed etymology for Dollywaggon Pike, England.
Dómisnes
Cape Kolka in Latvia
Dunheith
The plains of the Danube.

=== E ===
Eiriksey
"Eric's Isle". Eriskay, Scotland.
*Elfeng, *Elfangr or *Elfing
"River flowing through boggy meadows". Elbląg river in Northwest Poland.

=== F ===
Fetlafjørðr
Betanzos Estuary
finnar
Sami people
frakkar, Frakkland
Related to frakka ("spear"). The Franks and the Frankish kingdom.
Furðustrandir
"Wonderstrands". An uncertain stretch of coastline in North America.

=== G ===
Gandvik
A dangerous sea, the Baltic Sea, the Gulf of Bothnia or the White Sea.
Garðaríki, Garðaveldi
"the kingdom of cities". Kievan Rus
gryting
"greut-" may mean "gravel, grit, earth". The Ostrogoths, according to the Hervarar saga.
Gutagard
The trading post of the merchants from Visby (in Gotland) in Veliky Novgorod.

=== H ===
Haddingjar
Related to Old Icelandic haddr meaning "woman's hair". The Hasdingi Vandals.
Harvaða fjöllum
The Carpathians.
*Heiðabýr, ᚼᛅᛁᚦᛅ᛭ᛒᚢ
"Heath-settlement". Hedeby, a Danish trading settlement in Schleswig-Holstein, Germany.
Helluland
"Land of Flat Rocks" or "Land of Flat Stones". The first of the three lands the Greenland Norse found in North America. According to a footnote in Arthur Middleton Reeves's The Norse Discovery of America (1906), "the whole of the northern coast of America, west of Greenland, was called by the ancient Icelandic geographers Helluland it Mikla, or "Great Helluland"; and the island of Newfoundland simply Helluland, or Litla Helluland." Most scholars agree that Helluland corresponds to Baffin Island in the present-day Canadian territory of Nunavut.
Herrey, Hersey
Isle of Arran.
Hjaltland
"hilt land". Shetland
Hlymrekr
Limerick
Hólmgarðr, Holmgarðir
"Island enclosure", the fortress of Rurikovo Gorodische near Veliky Novgorod.
Hóp
A location in Vinland.
Hreiðmarar
An uncertain sea mentioned in the Rök runestone. Since it is liked to Theodoric the Great, it should be the Mediterranean Sea.
Hunaland
A legendary location, inspired by the Frankish kingdom (Hugones in Latin) and the Huns.
Hundings
"Son of a dog". The Longobards.
Hvítramannaland
"White Men's Land". A land near Vinland. Also called Great Ireland.

=== I ===
Íngulssund
"Strait by Anglesey", Menai Strait
Írland hið mikla, Írland it mikla
"Great Ireland". A land near Vinland. Also called Hvítramannaland.

=== J ===
Jakobsland
"Land of James". The land around Santiago de Compostela.
Jómsborg
Fortress of the Jomsvikings in an uncertain location in Pomerania.
Jórsalahaf
"sea of Jerusalem". The Mediterranean. It is given as the location of Narbon ("Narbonne").
Jórsalir
Jerusalem. It exhibits a re-interpretation of the second element as -salir, denoting a hall or temple, common in Old Norse toponyms.
Jórvík
York

=== K ===
Karlsá
Cádiz
Kaup
"Purchase". A hill near Mokhovoye, Kaliningrad Oblast in Russia.
Kaupmanneyjar
"islands of the merchants". Copeland Islands, Northern Ireland.
Kænugarðr, Kœnugarðr
"Boatyard". Kyiv.
Kjalarnes
"Keel point". A location in Vinland.
Kænland, Kvenland
A territory in Northern Finland or Northern Sweden.
Konungsborgr
"King's castle". Cunningsburgh, Shetland.
Krossbør
"Cross farm or cross roads, market place". Crosby, Isle of Man.
kumrskar þjóðir
"Cumbrian people", the Strathclyde Britons.
kylfingar
A people of uncertain origin active in Northern Europe.

=== L ===
Langbarðaland
A Byzantine province in Southern Italy, formerly ruled by the Longobards. The Varangian troops deployed there were remembered in the Italy runestones.
Leifsbuðir
"Leif's temporary shelters". A settlement in Vinland.
Ljóðhús
"song house"? Isle of Lewis in the United Kingdom.

=== M ===
Madksjo
"Sea of worms". Sea near Vinland.
Markland
"Forest Land". A land south of Helluland in North America.
Meginzuborg
Mainz
Melansborg, Meilangsborg
Milan
Miklagarðr
"Big stronghold". Constantinople.
*Miliniska, Μιλινισκα
Smolensk
Myrkviðr
"Dark wood" or "black forest". The name of several European forests.

=== N ===
Namsborg, Nancsaborg
Nantes
Niflungaland
Related to mist. The land of the Nibelungs, the kingdom of the Burgundians.
Njorvasund
-narrow straight; The Strait of Gibraltar
Norðreyjar
"Northern islands", Orkney and Shetland.
*Nýgarðr
"New enclosure", a proposed etymology for Veliky Novgorod.

=== O ===
Orkneyjar
"Seal islands". Orkney.
Öxnafurða
"Oxen's ford". Oxford
Papar
Irish monks found by the Norsemen in Iceland and Faroe.

=== P ===
Palteskja
After the Polota river. Polotsk in Belarus.

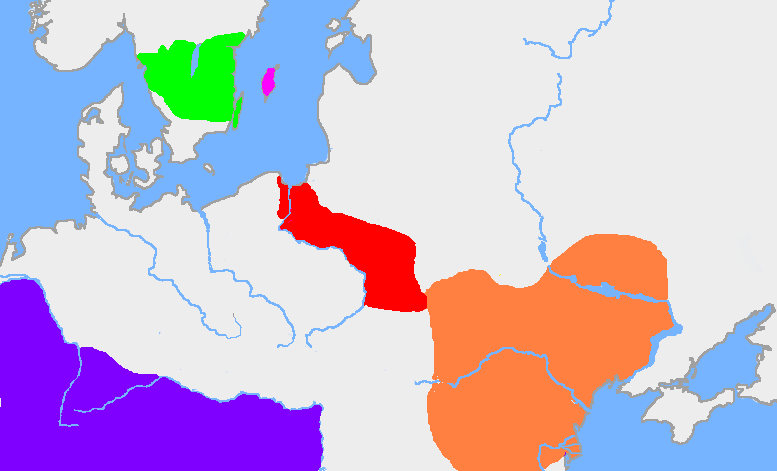
The oldest regions labelled Reidgotaland (in red and orange). The purple area is the Roman Empire and the pink area is Gotland

Peituborg
Poitiers.

=== R ===
Ráðstofa
Rostov
Reidgotaland, Reidgothland, Reidgotland, Hreidgotaland or Hreiðgotaland
Hreiðr can mean "bird's nest", but hreið- is also a name-prefix meaning "beautiful", "eager", "great", "famous", "noble". Another possibility is that it was originally reið "ride, journey". The same tribal name was used for the Gutes of Gotland. The identification of the territory varies between the sources: the island of Gotland, Götaland, the land of the Goths, i.e. Gothiscandza, Denmark and Sweden, Jutland. The Hreidgoths (hraiðgutum) may also be the Ostrogoths in south-eastern Europe.
Rothemadum
Rothomagum, Rouen in the Haakon Haakonssøns saga.
Rothesay
"Roth's island", "Rother's Isle" or a corruption of the Gaelic rath meaning "fort". Isle of Bute, Scotland.
Rúðuborg, Rúða
Rouen

=== S ===
Sandey
Iona
saxar
Related to Proto-Germanic *sahsą ("knife, dagger"). The Saxons.
Saxelfr
"Saxon Elbe". The river Elbe.
Saxland
"Land of the Saxons". Germany.
Skarðaborg
"Fortified place of Thorgils Skarthi" or "gap hill". Scarborough, North Yorkshire.
Seeburg
Grobiņa in Latvia.
Seljupollar
A Guarda
Serkland, Særkland, Srklant, Sirklant, Serklat
"Land of the Saracens". The Middle East, sometimes Georgia. Mentioned in the Serkland Runestones.
Signa
Seine
Skíð,Skuy, *Skýey, or Skuyö
"Misty isle", "cloud isle". Skye, Scotland.
Skræling
From skrækja, meaning "bawl, shout, or yell" or from skrá, meaning "dried skin", in reference to the animal pelts worn by the Inuit. The name the Norse Greenlanders gave the previous inhabitants of North America and Greenland.
Skuggifjord
Hudson Strait
Straumfjörð
"Current-fjord", "Stream-fjord" or "Tide-fjord". A fjord in Vinland. Straumsey ("Current-isle") lies at the mouth of Straumfjörð.
Suðreyjar
"Southern islands". Hebrides.
Suðrvegr
"South way", Germany.
Susat
Soest, Germany
Súrsdalar
Suzdal

=== T ===
Tarlungaland
Probably a corruption of Karlungaland, i.e., the land of the Carolingians.
Τελιουτζα
Liubech
Túskaland
Touraine
Tyrfing
The Thervingi Goths.
Tyrvist
Tiree
Τζερνιγωγα
Chernihiv

=== V ===
Valland
"Land of the **Walhaz". Land of the Celtic- and Romance-speaking peoples.
Vendland
"Land of the Wends". Slavic areas East from Lübeck.
Vernisa
Worms, Germany.
vestmenn
"Westmen", the Gaels of Ireland and Britain.
Vikinglow, Wykynlo
Wicklow
Vindau
Ventspils in Latvia. Named after the Venta River.
Vineta
A mythical city in the Baltic of disputed location.
Vínland
"Wine land", "pasture land". The area of coastal North America explored by Norse Vikings.
Vitaholmr
"demarcation islet", Vytachiv

== See also ==
- Etymology of the Hebrides
- Names of the major Dnieper rapids
- Place names in Ireland of Norse origin
- Trade route from the Varangians to the Greeks
- Viking settlements outside Scandinavia
- Volga trade route
