= Point Rosee =

Historic site on the Atlantic coast of Canada

- Location of Point Rosee in Newfoundland
- 47.8387°N 59.3781°W
- Nearest city: Port aux Basques

Point Rosee (French: Pointe Rosée), previously known as Stormy Point, is a headland near Codroy at the southwest end of the island of Newfoundland, on the Atlantic coast of Canada.

In 2014, Point Rosee was designated a potential Norse archaeological site based on near-infrared satellite images. It was excavated in 2015 and 2016 by a team of researchers directed by Sarah Parcak. In a report published on November 8, 2017, the researchers concluded that there was "no evidence whatsoever for either a Norse presence or human activity at Point Rosee prior to the historic period".

== Archaeology ==
Examining near-infrared satellite images and high-resolution aerial photographs in 2014, Parcak, an American archaeologist, Egyptologist, and remote sensing expert, found a site with rectilinear features that suggested the presence of a 22-meter long by 7-meter wide Norse longhouse. Parcak stated that this was exactly the same size as the longhouses at L'Anse aux Meadows and was one of the reasons Parcak decided to excavate at Point Rosee. The Norse longhouse at L'Anse aux Meadows had turf walls over 6-feet thick and left grass covered mounds where the turf walls had been. No grass covered mounds were found at Point Rosee. During a two-week exploratory dig in June 2015, directed by Parcak and co-directed by her husband Gregory "Greg" Mumford, a professor of anthropology, uncovered what they thought was a turf wall, a style of construction used by the Norse. By the end of the 2016 excavation it was determined that the soil feature that was thought to be a turf wall was the result of natural processes. In their November 2017 report Parcak and Mumford stated that the "turf/wall-type features are not man-made."

The 2015 excavation found an accumulation of bog iron ore that they thought was evidence of Norse roasted bog iron ore (roasting being the first step in the production of iron). The accumulation of the bog iron ore was determined in 2016 to also be the result of natural processes. Birgitta Linderoth Wallace, one of the leading experts of Norse archaeology in North America and a member of the team who excavated the Norse site at L'Anse aux Meadows in the 1960s, stated that the roasting, if any, could have been caused by a campfire, and Indigenous people are known to have lived in Newfoundland for thousands of years before the Norse arrived. In 2015, Frederick "Fred" Schwarz, a Canadian archaeologist and also a co-director of the 2015 excavation, found a cracked boulder that he thinks was possibly cracked by fire. In their 2017 report Parcak and Mumford wrote that the cracked boulder, that they called a potential "bog iron ore hearth" and its surrounding area were deemed "to be far more likely, if not all but certainly, to represent natural features rather than anthropogenic features."

According to Douglas "Doug" Bolender, an archaeologist specializing in the Norse, only the Norse would have been roasting bog iron ore in Newfoundland. The cracked boulder, surrounding ash, and bog iron ore found in 2015 was thought by Parcak to be evidence of Norse bog iron ore roasting and maybe iron ore smelting. The smelting, not the roasting, of iron ore creates a glass-like waste by-product known as slag. The presence of iron ore slag would be proof of iron ore smelting and that would be proof that Point Rosee was a Norse site. During the 2015 excavation Parcak's team found what they thought was slag from iron ore smelting. Testing proved what was thought to be slag was just bog ore. Excavations in 2015 and 2016 did not turn up any evidence of a Norse presence. Furthermore, the 2016 excavation proposed that the turf wall and bog ore discovered in 2015 were the result of natural processes.

The 2016 documentary film Vikings Unearthed included information about the 2015 excavation and the radiocarbon dating of two berries from the site, which returned dates between the 1600s and the 1800s. In the film Parcak commented that this was inconsistent with the archaeology of the site, and concluded that the samples must have been intrusive. Bolender added that the preservation of organics on the site was poor and that he did not think that it had good potential for radiocarbon dating. Carbon residue scraped from the cracked boulder was later radiocarbon dated to between 800 and 1300 CE, indicating that there was a fire at Point Rosee between those two dates. In their 2017 report Parcak and Mumford did not claim any of the radiocarbon dates were evidence of a Norse presence at Point Rosee.

Martha Drake, Newfoundland's Provincial Archaeologist, who has been involved with the Point Rosee project since 2014, questions that Point Rosee is a Norse site. Birgitta Wallace, Research Archaeologist Emerita, Parks Canada Agency, is also unsure of the identification of Point Rosee as a Norse site, as is Karen Milek, archaeologist specializing in the Norse and member of the 2016 excavation, along with Barry Gaulton and Michael Deal, both professors of archaeology at Memorial University, Newfoundland and Labrador's University. In their November 8, 2017, report Parcak and Mumford wrote that they "found no evidence whatsoever for either a Norse presence or human activity at Point Rosee prior to the historic period" and that "None of the team members, including the Norse specialists, deemed this area as having any traces of human activity." Parcak has not applied for any new archaeological permits to excavate at Point Rosee since 2016.

== Location ==
Point Rosee, shown on an 1859 map as Stormy Point, is a remote headland above a rocky shoreline on the Gulf of Saint Lawrence, approximately 600 kilometres (370 mi) south of L'Anse aux Meadows, which is near the northernmost point in Newfoundland and is the only confirmed Norse site in North America. Karen Milek, who completed her PhD in Archaeology at the University of Cambridge and was a member of the 2016 excavation, expressed doubt that Point Rosee was a Norse site as there are no good landing sites for their boats. The shoreline is filled with large, unnavigable rocks, and there are steep cliffs between the shoreline and the excavation site. Birgitta Wallace, who in 2015 the Canadian Archaeological Association called "the world's expert" on the Norse in North America, also expressed doubt about Point Rosee being a Norse site due to the rocky shoreline and the lack of fresh water. Locals say the Point Rosee excavation area has been used as a sheep pasture or for growing vegetables. Some area residents hope the discovery will boost tourism in the Codroy Valley.

== Parcak and Mumford's November 8, 2017, report ==
In their November 8, 2017, report to the Provincial Archaeology Office in St. John's, Newfoundland, Parcak and Mumford wrote "There are no clear findings of human activity prior to 1800" that they "found no evidence whatsoever for either a Norse presence or human activity at Point Rosee prior to the historic period" and that "None of the team members, including the Norse specialists, deemed this area as having any traces of human activity." As absolutely no evidence of a Norse presence was found, and with many of the Norse experts stating that this was not a likely site for a Norse settlement, no future excavations are planned for Point Rosee. Parcak and Mumford state in their report that their findings do not warrant a return to Point Rosee. Parcak has not applied for any new archaeological permits to excavate at Point Rosee since 2016.

== Media ==
Parcak's research was in connection with the documentaries Vikings Unearthed and The Vikings Uncovered, a co-production deal between PBS, BBC, and BBC Worldwide North America. They first aired on April 6, 2016, and featured Point Rosee. There are many other sources of information about Point Rosee.

== See also ==
- Helluland
- History of Greenland
- Hvítramannaland
- Former colonies and territories in Canada
- List of communities in Newfoundland and Labrador
- Markland
- Norse colonization of the Americas
- Skálholt Vinland Map
- Thorfinn Karlsefni
- Vinland
