= Great Ireland =

Phantom island

Great Ireland (Old Norse: Írland hit mikla or Írland it mikla), also known as White Men's Land (Hvítramannaland) or Land of the White People, and in Latin similarly as Hibernia Major and Albania, was a land said by various Norsemen to be located near Vinland. In one report, in the Saga of Eric the Red, some skrælingar captured in Markland described the people in what was supposedly White Men's Land, to have been "dressed in white garments, uttered loud cries, bore long poles, and wore fringes." Another report identifies it with the Albani people, with "hair and skin as white as snow."

Scholars and writers disagree on the nature of the land, from either being treated as a myth based on faded knowledge of lands in the western ocean, to theories on actually locating it somewhere in North America.

== History ==
=== Mythical origins ===
Celtic folklore tells of a mythical land across the western ocean often referred to as the Celtic Otherworld, also known as Annwn or Avalon, among other names. The Byzantine scholar Procopius of Caesarea described the Otherworld of the ancient Gauls and said it was located west of Britain.

Plutarch (1st cent.), in a chapter from the Moralia called 'Concerning the Face Which Appears in the Orb of the Moon', describes a land called Ogygia that was five days sail from Britain and that the Celtic natives also knew of three other lands equal distance from Ogygia and from each other in the direction of the setting sun including a 'Great Continent' and 'Land of Cronus' and from the ancient era until the early Christian historical era, geographers referred to the waters beyond Iceland as the ‘Cronian Sea’.

Irish documents called ‘Immrama’ from the 6th and 7th centuries supposedly record the adventures of Irish priests in the western ocean, while other folkloric stories tell of the Atlantic voyages of Saint Brendan and King Arthur, often considered mythical. Gerardus Mercator refers to a Jacob Cnoyen, who had learned that eight men returned to Norway from an expedition to the Arctic islands in 1364, in a letter to John Dee (1577), stating specifically that the eight men who came to Norway in 1364 were not survivors of a recent expedition, but descended from the colonists who had settled the distant lands several generations earlier and claimed to be descendants of King Arthur's expedition.

The following is a translation taken from Mercator's 1569 polar map:

"we have taken [the Arctic geography] from the Itinerium of Jacobus Cnoyen of the Hague, who makes some citations from the Gesta of Arthur of Britain; however, the greater and most important part he learned from a certain priest at the court of the king of Norway in 1364. He was descended in the fifth generation from those whom Arthur had sent to inhabit these lands, and he related that in the year 1360 a certain Minorite, an Englishman from Oxford, a mathematician, went to those islands; and leaving them, advanced still farther by magic arts and mapped out all and measured them by an astrolabe in practically the subjoined figure, as we have learned from Jacobus. The four canals there pictured he said flow with such current to the inner whirlpool, that if vessels once enter they cannot be driven back by wind."

=== Encounters ===
==== Landnámabók ====
According to the Landnámabók, Ari Marsson discovered the land six days' sailing west of Ireland. This journey is thought to have occurred around the year 983.

Their son was Ari, who drifted to White Men's Land, which some people call Greater Ireland. It lies in the ocean to westward, near Vineland the Good, said to be a six-day sail west from Ireland. Ari couldn't get away, and was baptized there. This story was first told by Hrafn Limerick-Farer who spent a long time at Limerick in Ireland. Thorkel Gellisson quoted some Icelanders who had heard Earl Thorfinn of Orkney say that Ari had been recognized in White Man's Land, and couldn't get away from there, but was thought very highly of.

==== Annals of Greenland ====
The Annals of Greenland, an 11th-century Norse chronicle, says:

Next to Vinland the Good and a little beyond lies Albania, which is Hvitramannaland. Thither formerly were sailings from Ireland. Irishmen and Icelanders recognized Ari, son of Mar and Thorkatla from Reykjaness, of whom no tidings have been received for a long time and who became a chieftain of the land.

==== Saga of Eric the Red ====
White Men's Land is also mentioned in the Saga of Eric the Red, where it is related that the inhabitants of Markland speak of it to Thorfinn Karlsefni.

Now, when they sailed from Vinland, they had a southern wind, and reached Markland, and found five Skrælingar; one was a bearded man, two were women, two children. Karlsefni's people caught the children, but the others escaped and sunk down into the earth. And they took the children with them, and taught them their speech, and they were baptized. The children called their mother Vætilldi, and their father Uvægi. They said that kings ruled over the land of the Skrælingar, one of whom was called Avalldamon, and the other Valldidida. They said also that there were no houses, and the people lived in caves or holes. They said, moreover, that there was a land on the other side over against their land, and the people there were dressed in white garments, uttered loud cries, bore long poles, and wore fringes. This was supposed to be Hvitramannaland (White Man's Land). Then came they to Greenland, and remained with Eirik the Red during the winter.

==== Eyrbyggja saga ====
In the Eyrbyggja saga, Gudleif Gudlaugson with his crew had attempted to sail from Dublin to Iceland, but was instead driven out to sea, "first west and then south-west, well out of sight of land". They finally arrived in a land; they did not know where, but it seemed great. Later, the inhabitants of the land came to meet them, and the Norse thought they seemed to speak Irish. Soon, hundreds of these people came to attack and capture the Norsemen, and marched them inland to a court to be tried and sentenced. The Norse then understood that these people wanted either to kill or to enslave them, but were soon saved by the intervention of an Icelandic-speaking leader-figure who lived among the people. He started asking detailed questions about people in Borgarfjord and Breidafjord in Iceland, and gave the Norse some items to pass on to specific people there. He also claimed that Gudleif had been lucky to arrive at the place, because "this is a big country and the harbours are few and far between". Although the man did not want to reveal his own identity (reportedly to keep his "kinsmen and blood-brothers" from getting in trouble by trying to visit him), the Norse later took him to have been Bjorn the Breidavik-Champion, who had been exiled from Iceland some thirty years earlier.

The described circumstances in this report have led some to connect it with Great Ireland, although the Eyrbyggja saga does not make this explicit identification. The voyage is thought to have taken place in 1029.

=== Other references ===
==== 12th century Norman Sicily ====
In the 12th century, in Norman Sicily (where the Normans probably brought the belief with them from Scandinavia), the Arab geographer al-Idrisi in his famous Tabula Rogeriana mentioned Irlandah-al-Kabirah (Great Ireland). According to him, "from the extremity of Iceland to that of Great Ireland," the sailing time was "one day." Although historians note that both al-Idrisi and the Norse tend to understate distances, the only location this reference is thought to have possibly pointed to, must likely have been in Greenland.

==== Hauksbók ====
The Hauksbók states that the inhabitants of Hvítramannaland were albani, meaning people with white hair and skin.

==== 16th-century Iceland ====
In a 16th-century Icelandic text, a chart had apparently been made of the land;

Sir Erlend Thordson had obtained from abroad the geographical chart of that Albania, or land of the White men, which is situated opposite Vinland the good, of which mention has been before made in this little book, and which the merchants formerly called Hibernia Major or Great Ireland, and lies, as has been said, to the west of Ireland proper. This chart had held accurately all those tracts of land, and the boundaries of Markland, Einfœtingjaland, and little Helluland, together with Greenland, to the west of it, where apparently begins the good Terra Florida.

== Location hypotheses ==
Kirsten Seaver identified the land as a fabled country, which had arisen on the background of the faded knowledge of lands in the far western ocean by Icelanders.

Carl Christian Rafn positioned Great Ireland in Chesapeake Bay. Rafn based his identification on Shawnee Native American legends of a race described as "white men who used iron instruments". These legends he connected to the description of the inhabitants of Greater Ireland as being white people who carried poles.

Other sources place Great Ireland in Newfoundland, Canada. Author Farley Mowat proposed that Great Ireland was on the western shore of Newfoundland, in the vicinity of St. George's Bay, and was populated by Papar who had fled first Iceland and then Greenland escaping Norse invaders.

More recent research agrees with the early assessment already proposed by Fridtjof Nansen in 1911 and sees Hvítramannaland as a purely mythological country based on a Norse reception of Irish geographical myths during the Viking Age.

== See also ==
- L'Anse aux Meadows
- Greenland
- Newfoundland and Labrador
- Azores
- Hy-Brasil – mythical island to the west of Ireland.
