= Tyrker =

Foreign explorer in the Norse discovery of America

Tyrker (or Tyrkir) is a character mentioned in the Norse Saga of the Greenlanders. He accompanied Leif on his voyage of discovery around the year 1000, and is portrayed as an older male servant. He is referred to as “foster father” by Leif Erikson, which may indicate he was a freed thrall, who once had the responsibility of looking after and rearing the young Leif.

Leif and his company wintered in the New World after building Leifsbudir (Leif’s dwellings), possibly somewhere in Newfoundland or the adjacent area. According to the saga, he divided his men into two parties, which took turns in exploring the surrounding area. He cautioned his followers to keep together and return to sleep at their quarters. One evening Tyrker did not return with his party. Greatly distraught, Leif, at the head of twelve men, went in search of him, and he had not gone far when he discovered the old thrall, greatly excited, gesticulating wildly, and evidently drunk. “Why, my fosterer,” cried Leif, “have you come so late? What made you leave your companions!” Tyrker answered in his own language, but when remembering that the Norsemen could not understand him, he spoke, after some time, in their tongue: “I have not gone very far; still I have some news for you. I have discovered vines loaded with grapes.” “Are you telling the truth, my foster-father?” exclaimed Leif. “I am sure of telling the truth,” Tyrker said, “for in my native land there are vines in plenty.” This caused Leif to give the country the name of Vinland.

Tyrker's origin has often been claimed by various nationalist groups, with arguments presented for German, Hungarian, Slavic or even Turkish backgrounds. However, among historians his origin is undisputedly considered to be (northern) German, as the saga mentions him speaking German and he is referred to in terms usually reserved to the Saxon inhabitants of northern Germany. Additionally, the story shares the element of wild grapes with the Irish The Voyage of Máel Dúin. However, the Norse word used in the saga is vinber. While this sometimes refers to grapes, it also translates into "wine-berry", and there is a long-standing Nordic tradition to make wine out of berries available. We know from historical records that the Icelanders and Greenlanders even made wine from crowberry. In the Newfoundland/Labrador area, squashberry, gooseberry, and cranberry all grow wild, and may serve as an explanations for Leif's discovery of "wine-berries".

Remains of a Norse settlement from the period in question has been found at L'Anse aux Meadows, Newfoundland, Canada.
