= Cape Porcupine, Newfoundland and Labrador =

Headland on the coast of Labrador in Canada

Coordinates: 53.938240°N 57.126670°W

The Headland of Cape Porcupine is a remote point of land on the south east coast of Labrador in the Canadian province of Newfoundland and Labrador. The cape juts out into the Atlantic Ocean in a generally easterly direction and forms a protective barrier from northerly gales for the beach of white sands, which might be a candidate for the stretch referred to as Wonderstrands by the Norse.

The origin of the name is not known but not likely for the rodent rather for the Porcupine caribou that can be found in the area. The beach in the area is believed to have been visited by explorer Leif Eirikson, who called it Markland or Land of Woods.

The closest settlement to Cape Porcupine is Cartwright, Labrador, which lies approximately 17 miles (27 km) to the south.

The area is not accessible by road; it is reached by air (helicopter) or by sea.

In 2008, dumped Dunnite in the area was mistaken for rusty rocks.
