= Wonderstrands =

Coastline in the Sagas of Icelanders

Wonderstrands refers to the Furðustrandir, a stretch of coastline mentioned in the Icelandic Eiríks saga, relating the deeds of Erik the Red. It was reported to be located north of Straumfjörð and south of Kjalarnes promontory.

Some believe that it refers to the extended beaches located on the coast of Labrador, province of Newfoundland and Labrador, Canada. In The Vinland Sagas and the Actual Characteristics of Eastern Canada, Swedish archaeologist Mats G. Larsson references philologist Jan Paul Strid and puts forward that a more modern translation of Furðustrandir and examination of the sagas may put the Wonderstrands between Gabarus Bay and St. Peter’s Bay, Cape Breton Island, Nova Scotia, Canada.

== The name ==
The first element in the Norse name is the genitive form of furða "wonder, astonishment"; the adjective furðuligr has the meaning "strange". This word is not used or found in other place names from Norse times.

== Location according to the saga ==
According to Sephton’s 1880 translation of the saga, the Wonderstrands was beyond Helluland, Markland and Kjalarnes, but north of Straumfjörð and Hóp.

One version of the saga of Erik the Red accounts the location thus, starting from Vestribygd (probably Western Settlement):

They sailed away from land; then to the Vestribygd and to Bjarneyjar [the Bear Islands]. Thence they sailed away from Bjarneyjar with northerly winds. They were out at sea two half-days. Then they came to land, and rowed along it in boats, and explored it, and found there flat stones, many and so great that two men might well lie on them stretched on their backs with heel to heel. Polar-foxes were there in abundance. This land they gave name to, and called it Helluland [stone-land].

Then they sailed with northerly winds two half-days, and there was then land before them, and on it a great forest and many wild beasts. An island lay in the south-east off the land, and they found bears thereon, and called the island Bjarney [Bear Island]; but the mainland, where the forest was, they called Markland [forest-land]. Then, when two half-days were passed, they saw land, and sailed under it. There was a cape to which they came. They cruised along the land, leaving it on the starboard side. There was a harbourless coast-land, and long sandy strands. They went to the land in boats, and found the keel of a ship, and called the place Kjalarnes [Keelness]. They gave also name to the strands, calling them Furdustrandir [wonder-shore], because it was tedious to sail by them. Then the coast became indented with creeks, and they directed their ships along the creeks.

== Suggested locations ==
There is no popular or scholarly agreement on the exact location of the Wonderstrands, and Fridtjof Nansen and Helge Ingstad held that the Saga of Erik the Red in general could not be trusted. The suggestions that have been made, however, place the Wonderstrands from southern Labrador to coastlines beyond Cape Cod. For example, some have suggested a stretch of coast somewhere to the south of Cape Breton Island, Nova Scotia. In the Introduction to John R.L. Anderson's 1967 book "Vinland Voyage", George D. Painter, deputy curator of the British Museum's incunabula department matched the Wonderstrands to Cape Cod. The most recent suggestion, was presented in a 2012 article by Jónas Kristjánsson. He suggests that the Wonderstrands refers to the coastline between L'Anse aux Meadows and Sop's Bay, on Newfoundland.

== See also ==
- Vinland
- Vinland sagas
