= Carl Christian Rafn =

Danish historian, translator and antiquarian (1795–1864)

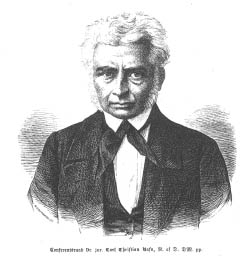
Carl Christian Rafn.

Carl Christian Rafn (January 16, 1795 – October 20, 1864) was a Danish historian, translator and antiquarian. His scholarship to a large extent focused on translation of Old Norse literature and related Northern European ancient history. He was also noted for his early advocacy of the recognition of Norse colonization of North America.

== Biography ==
Carl Christian Rafn was born in Brahesborg on the island of Fyn in Funen County, Denmark. After attending the Odense Cathedral School (Odense Katedralskole), he entered the University of Copenhagen where he earned his law degree and graduated (1816). After having been employed as a lieutenant with the Funen light dragoons in Odense, in 1820, he became a teacher in Latin and grammar at the Army Cadet Academy (Landkadetakademiet) in Copenhagen.

Rafn published much of his work in 1837 in the Antiquitates Americanæ. It is considered the first scholarly exposition of pre-Columbian Norse exploration. At the time of Rafn's research, the Norse sagas concerning Vinland were considered by most scholars to be mere legends. The ideas advanced by Rafn found new support since the 1960s with the discovery of the Norse settlement at L'Anse aux Meadows in northern Newfoundland, Canada.

In 1836, he was admitted as a member of the Royal Danish Society for History (Det kongelige danske Selskab for Fædrelandets Historie). In 1836 he was also elected a member of the American Antiquarian Society. He was a member of numerous other foreign associations and societies and received the philosophical and legal doctorate from abroad.

Rafn became a Knight of the Order of the Dannebrog in 1828 and was awarded the Grand Cross of the Dannebrog (Dannebrogsmand) in 1842. He died in 1864 at the age of 69 and was buried at Assistens Cemetery in Copenhagen.

== Selected works ==
=== Committee ===
- 1821–1826 – Nordiske Kæmpehistorier (3 vols.)
- 1824 – Jomsvikingesaga
- 1825–1837 – Fornmanna sögur (12 vols.)
- 1826 – Krákumál
- 1826 – 1827 – Kong Olaf Tryggvesøns Saga (3 vols.)
- 1829–1830 – Fornaldarsögur Norðrlanda (3 vols.)
- 1829–1830 – Nordiske Fortidssagaer (3 vols.)
- 1832 – Færeyínga saga
- 1837 – Antiqvitates Americana
- 1838–1854 – Grønlands historiske Mindesmærker (3 vols.)
- 1850–1858 – Antiquités Russes d'après les monuments historique des anciens et des Islandais Scandinaves (2 vols.)
- 1852 – Saga Játvarðar konúngs Hin Helga (with Jón Sigurðsson)
- 1856 – Antiquités de l'Orient

=== Journals ===
- 1832–1836 – Nordisk Tidsskrift for Oldkyndighed (3 vols.)
- 1836–1863 – Annaler for nordisk Oldkyndighed (og Historie) (23 vols.)
- 1836–1860 – Mémoires de la société des antiquaires du Nord
- 1843–1863 – Antikvarisk Tidsskrift (7 vols.)

== See also ==
- Viking revival
- Norse colonization of the Americas

== Other sources ==
- Jespersen, Knud J.V. (1990) Carl Christian Rafn og det Fyenske Militair-Bibliothek (Odenses bibliotekshistorie, Odense Universitetsforlag) ISBN 87-7492-772-8

== Related reading ==
- Borring, Laurits Stephan (1864) Notices on the life and writings of Carl Christian Rafn: Permanent secretary of the Royal Society of Northern Antiquaries, Counsellor of Conference
- Gröndal, Benedikt (1869) Breve fra og til Carl Christian Rafn med en Biographi
- Widding, Ole (1964) Carl Christian Rafn – Biographie of Old Nordic-Icelandic Studies
