= Sarah Parcak =

American archaeologist (born 1978)

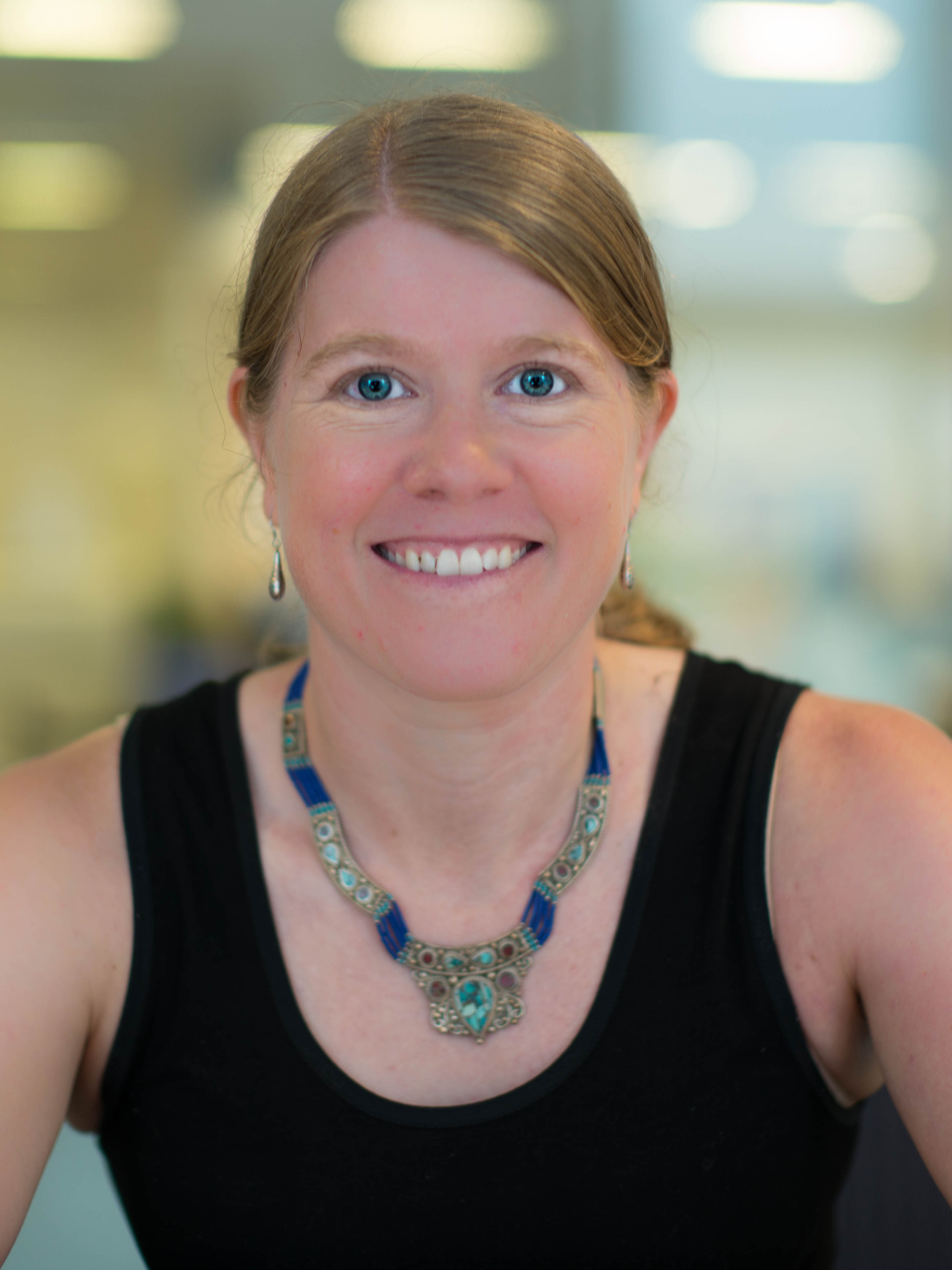
- Parcak in 2014
- Born: Sarah Helen Parcak; 1978 (age 47–48); Bangor, Maine, U.S.
- Occupations: Professor; archaeologist; Egyptologist
- Spouse: Greg Mumford (m. 2005)
- Children: 1

Academic background
- Education: Yale University (BA); University of Cambridge (PhD)

Academic work
- Institutions: University of Alabama at Birmingham

Sarah Helen Parcak (born 1978) is an American archaeologist and Egyptologist who has used satellite imagery to identify potential archaeological sites in Egypt, Rome, and elsewhere in the former Roman Empire. She is a professor of anthropology and director of the Laboratory for Global Observation at the University of Alabama at Birmingham. In partnership with her husband, Greg Mumford, she directs survey and excavation projects in the Faiyum and in Egypt's East Delta.

== Education ==
Parcak was born in Bangor, Maine, and received her bachelor's degree in Egyptology and Archaeological Studies from Yale University in 2001, and her PhD from the University of Cambridge. She is a professor of Anthropology at the University of Alabama at Birmingham (UAB); prior to that she was a teacher of Egyptian art and history at the University of Wales, Swansea.

During her undergraduate studies at Yale University, Parcak participated in her first of many digs in Egypt as well as a remote sensing course.

== Career ==
From 2003 to 2004, Parcak used satellite images and surface surveys to detect potential sites of archaeological interest, some dating back to 3000 BC. Parcak's work consisted of detecting minute differences in topography, geology and plant life to explore sites from a variety of cultures. Satellites capable of detecting infrared wavelengths are sometimes able to distinguish differences in plant's chlorophyll, which can sometimes distinguish plants that grow over very shallow buried structures.

In partnership with her husband, Dr. Greg Mumford, she directs Survey and Excavation Projects in the Fayoum and Egypt's East Delta. They used satellite imagery to look for water sources and archaeological sites. According to Parcak, this approach might reduce time and cost for determining archaeological sites compared to surface detection.

In 2007, she founded the Laboratory for Global Observation at the University of Alabama at Birmingham.

In 2009, her book Satellite Remote Sensing for Archaeology was published by Routledge, describing the methodology of satellite archaeology. A review in Antiquity described it as focusing "more on technical methodology than interpretation and analysis," described Parcak's work as, "written in a lively style that makes a highly technical subject accessible to a general audience," and concluded that it was "a good introduction for undergraduate students of archaeology, anthropology and geography."

Parcak won the TED Prize for 2016.

In 2016, she was the recipient of Smithsonian magazine's American Ingenuity Award in the History category. The same year, using satellite images Parcak claimed to have potentially found the second-known Viking site in North America located at Point Rosee in Newfoundland. Upon subsequent ground investigation, no evidence of a Viking site or anything of archeological significance was found.

Her book Archaeology from Space: How the Future Shapes Our Past was published in July 2019 and won the Archaeological Institute of America Felicia A. Holton Book Award in 2022.

In 2020, she was awarded a John Simon Guggenheim Memorial Foundation 2020 Fellowship.

== Assessment of discovery claims ==
Parcak documented tombs at Lisht in Egypt, many of which had not been recorded in detail.

Parcak identified and mapped a feature at Petra in Jordan.

In May 2011, BBC News announced: "Egyptian pyramids found by infra-red satellite images" by Parcak and her team. NBC News said: "The landmark space archaeology project, led by Dr. Sarah Parcak and funded by the BBC... discovered 17 lost pyramids, 1000 tombs and 3,000 ancient settlements, including Tanis". Parcak later described the pyramids as potential pyramids. No refereed paper was made on this claim making it impossible to replicate. Parcak did not verify her claims. 15 of the 17 pyramids were not verified and so remain speculative. One of the 17 sites said to be a potential pyramid by Parcak was excavated by the Egyptian Ministry of Tourism and Antiquities and was found to be a natural landform. Another was found to be, potentially, a pyramid. A third was the already known excavated Pepi II pyramid which was discovered in 1926, not 2011.

Tanis has been excavated since 1836, not discovered in 2011 as was reported by BBC, however, Parcak produced a highly detailed map of the city.

Parcak published a study on archaeological site damage and looting in Egypt based on satellite imagery. She argued that looting increased significantly between 2002 and 2013 during the Egyptian revolution when guards left their posts. That was challenged in the same journal by Egyptologists who argued that aspects of its framing and categorization of damage were potentially "misleading" or "overstated". Parcak's theory about detecting pyramids using thermal infrared satellite imagery was described in Science.org. The theory has been criticized because thermal sensors are only able to detect temperature differences in the first few inches of soil. Emissive radiation from buried structures attenuates exponentially with depth which is especially true of Nile Valley soils which are saline and waterlogged and so limited for heat transfer measurements and detection.

A pyramid, therefore, would be undetectable. Even proxies such as building materials would be undetectable using thermal infrared. Another theory of Parcak's, that the chemical difference between mud-brick pyramids and the surrounding sand could be discerned at the surface using satellite-based multi-spectral scanners, is impossible. It is not possible that moisture from mud-brick pyramids could wick to the surface. The Nile Valley is a radiometrically very "noisy" environment to perform multi-spectral remote sensing in due to salt, water logging and 7,000 years of agriculture. Therefore, it is prone to false positives and misinterpretation. No refereed papers were published on the pyramid project making it impossible to replicate.

== Documentaries ==
In May 2012, she was the subject of a half-hour program on CNN's The Next List which profiles innovators "who are setting trends and making strides in various fields."

She was the focus of "Rome's Lost Empire", a TV documentary by Dan Snow, first shown on BBC One on 9 December 2012. She identified possible sites in Romania, Nabataea, Tunisia, and Italy, including the arena at Portus, the lighthouse and a canal to Rome beside the river Tiber.

A BBC co-production with PBS, NOVA/WGBH Boston and French Television, Vikings Unearthed (first broadcast April 4, 2016) documented her use of satellite imagery to detect possible remains of a Norse / Viking presence at Point Rosee, Newfoundland. In 2015, Parcak stated that remains were likely a "turf wall and roasted bog" iron ore; however, an excavation conducted in 2016 proved that the "turf wall and accumulation of bog iron ore" were actually natural features.

Sarah Parcak used the TED Prize money for a crowd-sourced quest. Satellite imagery was used to identify sites in Peru. No known articles in refereed journals were published on the study and so it is impossible to know gauge the impact of the study. GlobalXplorer Phase 2 was to take place in India starting in 2019. However, it stalled and is not active. The GlobalXplorer website became inactive in 2023.

== Controversies ==
In September 2020, Parcak's employer, the University of Alabama at Birmingham, issued a statement saying that tweets by Parcak aimed toward supporters of then-president Donald Trump following the death of Supreme Court Justice Ruth Bader Ginsburg showed poor judgement and did not reflect the opinions of the university.

After Rush Limbaugh's death in 2021, Parcak tweeted on Twitter that she hoped Limbaugh "suffered until his last breath". The tweet was protected under the first amendment according to the ACLU of University of Alabama in spite of calls to terminate her position as a professor. She also tweeted that historic monuments in Birmingham should be toppled.

== Works ==
- Satellite Remote Sensing for Archeology (2009)
- Archaeology from Space: How the Future Shapes Our Past (2019)
