= Skraeling Island =

Island off the east coast of Ellesmere Island in the Canadian territory of Nunavut

- Location within Nunavut Location within Canada

Geography
- Location: Northern Canada
- Coordinates: 78°54′43″N 075°38′00″W
- Archipelago: Queen Elizabeth Islands; Arctic Archipelago
- Length: 2,000 m (7000 ft)
- Width: 1,400 m (4600 ft)

Administration
- Canada
- Territory: Nunavut
- Region: Qikiqtaaluk

Demographics
- Population: Uninhabited

Skraeling Island is a Canadian island, located within the territory of Nunavut, which lies off the east coast of Ellesmere Island at the mouth of Alexandra Fiord. Buchanan Bay lies to its north-east.

== History ==
The Norse referred to the Indigenous peoples they encountered in Greenland and the New World as skræling. According to the ancient sagas, the Norse considered the natives hostile because they were repeatedly attacked by them.

== Archaeology ==
Skraeling Island is an extensive archeological site which has yielded a wealth of artifacts from Small-Tool cultures dating from 4500 BC (Dorset and Thule). Norse items found at Inuit sites — some 80 objects from a single site including a small driftwood carving of a face with European features — suggests that there was a lively trade between the groups (as well as an exchange of Norse goods among the Inuit).
