= Leifsbudir =

Settlement founded by Leif Eriksson

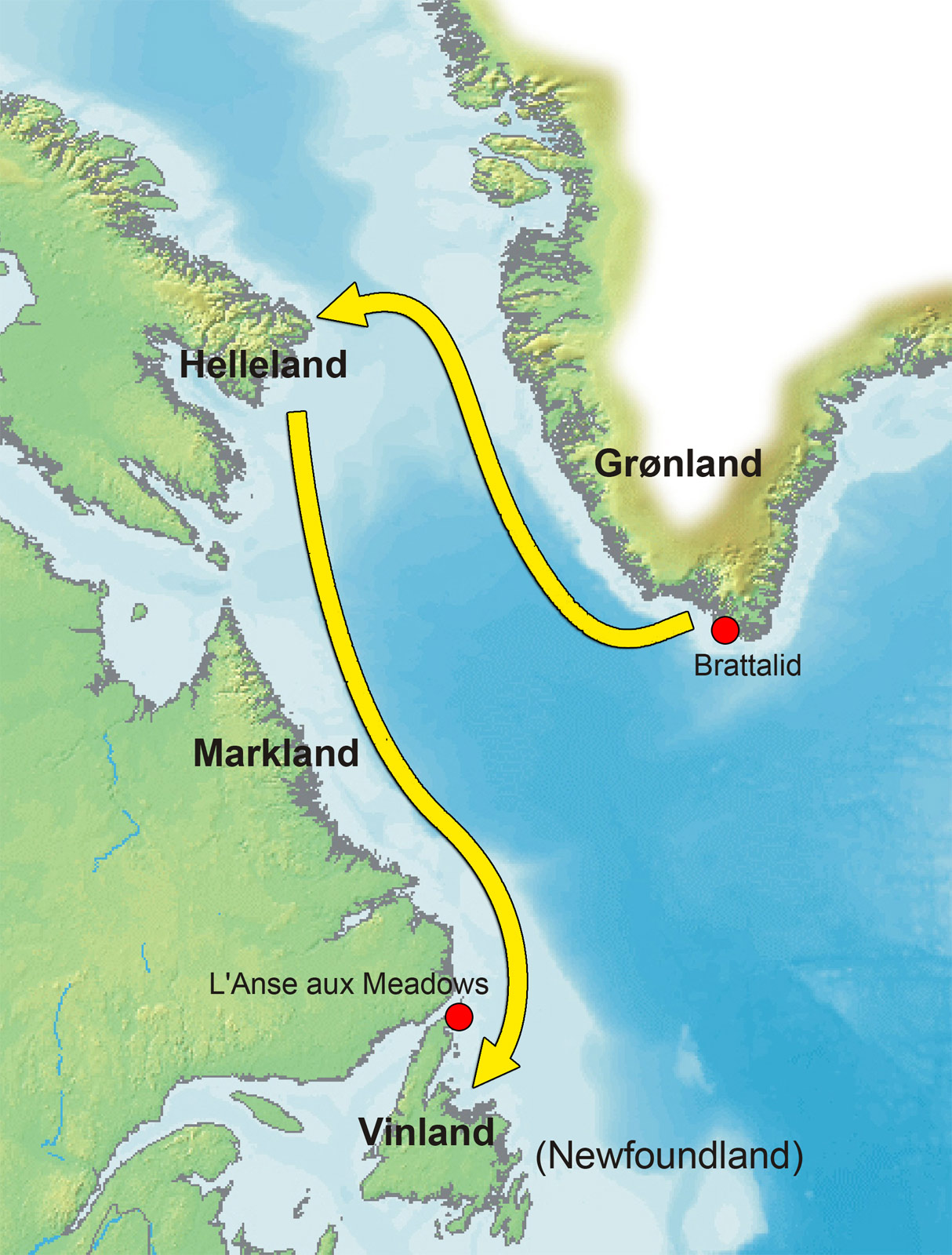
Leifsbudir is believed by some scholars to have been located at L'Anse aux Meadows in Newfoundland

Leifsbudir (Old Norse: Leifsbuðir) was a settlement mentioned in the Greenland Saga as founded by Leif Eriksson in 1000 or 1001 in Vinland.

The settlement was temporary and abandoned due to a lack of trade with natives. The Norse returned to Greenland.

Leifsbudir is believed by some scholars to have been located at L'Anse aux Meadows in Newfoundland, although this is widely disputed. Dr. Stuart C. Brown of Memorial University has written "...Dr. lngstad's Procrustean attempt to demonstrate that L'Anse aux Meadows is Leifsbudir is wholly unconvincing..." [Newfoundland Quarterly, Fall, 1988, page 42.]

== See also ==
- Skálholt
