= Markland =

Area in North America

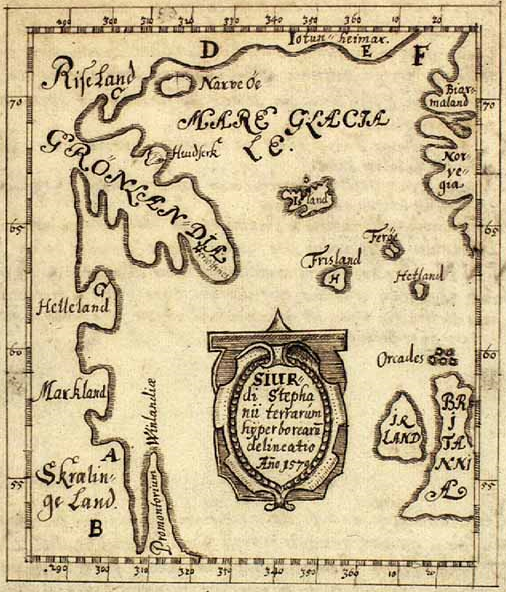
The Skálholt Map showing Latinized Norse placenames in the North Atlantic: Iotun-heimar (Jötunheimr); Riseland (Land of the Risi); Grönlandia (Greenland); Helleland (Helluland); Markland; Skrælinge Land (Land of the Skræling); Promontorium Winlandiæ (Promontory of Vinland)

Markland (Old Norse pronunciation: [ˈmɑrkˌlɑnd]) is the name given to one of three lands on North America's Atlantic shore discovered by Leif Eriksson around 1000 AD. It was located south of Helluland and north of Vinland.

Although it was never recorded to be settled by Norsemen, there were probably a number of later expeditions from Greenland to gather timber. A 1347 Icelandic document records that a ship went off course and ended up in Iceland in the process of returning from Markland, without further specifying where Markland was.

== Location ==
Markland has been suggested to have been part of the Labrador coast in Canada, as Labrador lies in the heavily forested taiga region of the Northern Hemisphere north of the location of Vinland on the island of Newfoundland. The area of Cape Porcupine has been suggested as a possible candidate for the site. The climate and the vegetation in this region may have changed significantly since the sagas were conceived, owing to the Medieval Warm Period and Little Ice Age.

The particular part of the Labrador coast is difficult to pinpoint, as Helluland has been placed everywhere from Baffin Island to the northern Labrador coast beyond Groswater Bay to the southern Labrador Coast.

== Sagas ==
The Saga of the Greenlanders tells that Leif Eriksson set out in 1002 or 1003 to follow the route that was first described by Bjarni Herjólfsson. The first land that Eriksson went to was covered with flat rocks (Old Norse: hella) and so he called it Helluland ("Land of the Flat Stones)". Next, Eriksson came to a land that was flat and wooded, with white sandy beaches, which he called Markland ("Forest Land"). Eriksson's crew cut down trees and took them to Greenland because Greenland has only one small forest and normally relies on driftwood or imports for lumber. The Saga of the Greenlanders also tells of 160 men and women who settled in Markland for winter protection led by Thorfinn Karlsefni (Þorfinnr Karlsefni Þórðarson), c. 1010.

The Saga of Erik the Red indicates that Markland is south of Helluland, north of Vinland off Kjalarnes, northwest of an island called Bjarney, and with a country that Karlsefni thinks may be Hvítramannaland somewhere opposite its coast.

== Milanese record ==
The only known mention of Markland in the Middle Ages outside of the Nordic area occurs in a chronicle written by the Milanese friar Galvaneus Fiamma in the first half of the 14th century. This is the only known mention of the New World before Columbus's voyage in 1492 outside of Northern Europe.

== See also ==
- Vikings
- Norse colonization of the Americas
