= Skálholt =

Historical site in the south of Iceland, at the river Hvítá

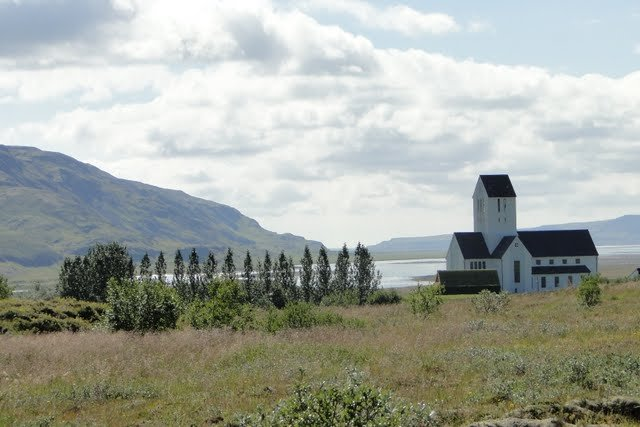
General view of Skálholt and the cathedral

Location of Skálholt within Iceland

Skálholt (Modern Icelandic: [ˈskaulˌhɔl̥t]; Old Norse: Skálaholt [ˈskɑːlɑˌholt]) is a historical site in the south of Iceland, at the river Hvítá.

== History ==
Skálholt was, through eight centuries, one of the most important places in Iceland. A bishopric was established in Skálholt in 1056. Until 1785, it was one of Iceland's two episcopal sees, along with Hólar, making it a cultural and political center. Iceland's first official school, Skálholtsskóli [ˈskaulˌhɔl̥(t)sˌskouːlɪ] (now Reykjavík Gymnasium, MR), was founded at Skálholt in 1056 to educate clergy. In 1992 the seminary in Skálholt was re-instituted under the old name and now serves as the education and information center of the Church of Iceland.

Throughout the Middle Ages there was significant activity in Skálholt; alongside the bishop's office, the cathedral, and the school, there was extensive farming, a smithy, and, while Catholicism lasted, a monastery. Along with dormitories and quarters for teachers and servants, the town made up a sizable gathering of structures. Adam of Bremen, writing circa 1075, described Skálholt (Scaldholz) as the "largest city" in Iceland. First the diocese of Skálholt was a suffragan of the Archdiocese of Hamburg-Bremen. When in 1104 the Diocese of Lund was elevated to an archdiocese, Lund became the metropolitan of Skálholt, and in 1153 Skálholt became a part of the province of Nidaros.

Continuing as the episcopal see after the Reformation to Lutheranism, the end of Catholicism in Iceland was marked in 1550 when the last Catholic bishop, Jón Arason of Hólar, was executed in Skálholt along with his two sons. The sacred reliquary of St. Thorlac (sixth bishop of Skálholt) was maintained at the cathedral until it too was destroyed in 1550, when his mortal remains were strewn about the cathedral grounds.

The partial expropriation of the bishopric's properties during the transition to Lutheranism had severe socio-economic consequences, directly contributing to the breakdown of Icelandic poor relief (see Reformation in Iceland).

Although no longer diocesan sees, Skálholt and Hólar are still the cathedra of the Church of Iceland's two suffragan bishops, and therefore the old cathedrals still serve as such.

Skálholt also receives many visitors each year. Hospitality is a branch of Skálholtsskóli's work and visitors can stay in its dormitories, single rooms, and cottages. Many cultural events such as concerts are held in Skálholt. Foremost of these is the Summer Concerts program in July, in which prominent classical musicians, choirs and other musicians are invited to perform.

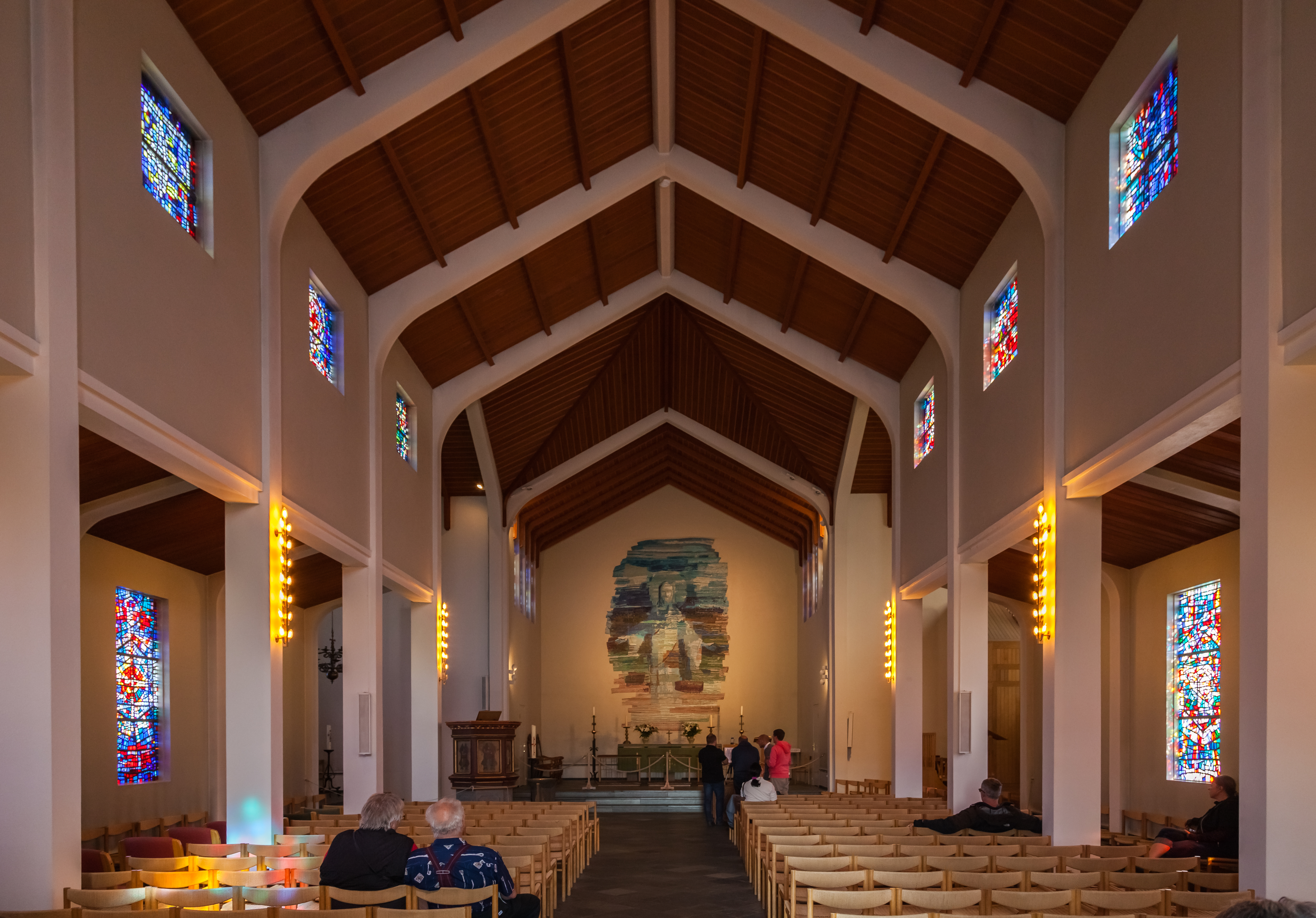
View of the interior of the cathedral, consecrated in 1963

== Cathedral ==
The current cathedral at Skálholt is relatively large in comparison to most Icelandic churches; its span from door to apse is approximately 30 meters. Some of its predecessors were even longer, reaching up to 50 m in length. The new cathedral was built from 1956 to 1963 as a part of the millennial celebrations of the episcopal see. The other Scandinavian churches celebrated this along with the Icelandic church and many of the new cathedral's items are gifts of theirs; for example, Gerður Helgadóttir's extensive stained glass windows are a gift from the Danes.

== Map ==
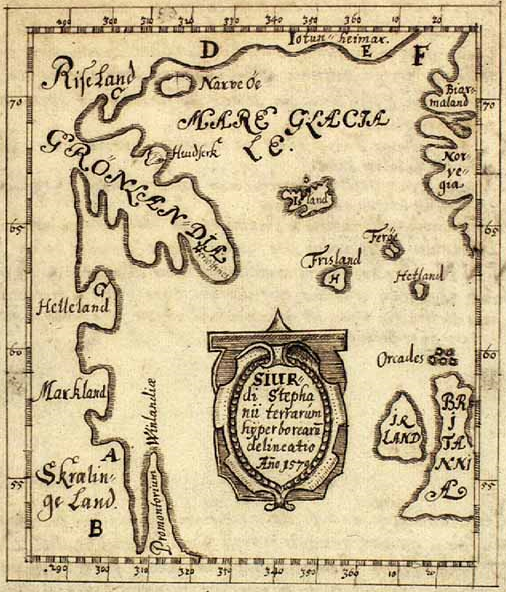
The Skálholt Map showing Latinized Norse placenames in the North Atlantic: Iotun-heimar (Jötunheimr); Riseland (Land of the Risi); Grönlandia (Greenland); Helleland (Helluland); Markland; Skrælinge Land (Land of the Skræling); Promontorium Winlandiæ (Promontory of Vinland)

In the late 1500s, Sigurd Stefánsson, a young Icelandic teacher, made a map that would later help solve a Viking mystery.

Sigurd came from Skálholt, a major religious centre in Iceland, and was the grandson of a bishop. After studying at the University of Copenhagen, Sigurd became a teacher at the former monastery of Skálholt, which remained the religious and educational centre in Iceland even after Protestantism was introduced in 1551.

Using medieval written sources, Sigurd marked places described in Norse texts on a map of the Atlantic. One of them was Vinland.

Sigurd’s original map, made in 1570, is now lost, but a copy was made in 1690 by Þórður Þorláksson, the Bishop of Skálholt, (also known by his Latinized name, Thorlacius). That copy is now preserved in the collection of the Danish Royal Library.

The map showed the northern edge of Vinland at about 51 degrees north latitude, the same line as southern Ireland. When the map was compared with modern geography, the Vinland placement lined up with the northern tip of Newfoundland.

That is one of the factors which helped archaeologists Anne Stine and Helge Ingstad decide where to dig during explorations in the 1960s. Ultimately, they were able to confirm the location of L'Anse aux Meadows, the only proven Viking settlement ever found in North America.

L'Anse aux Meadows is located at approximately 51°35′47″N 55°32′00″W.

== See also ==
- List of Skálholt bishops
- List of settlements in Iceland
- History of Iceland

== Other sources ==
- Adam of Bremen (edited by G. Waitz) (1876). Gesta Hammaburgensis ecclesiae pontificum. Berlin. Available online
- Adam of Bremen (translated by Francis Joseph Tschan and Timothy Reuter) (2002). History of the Archbishops of Hamburg-Bremen. Columbia University Press. ISBN 0-231-12575-5
