= Skræling =

Peoples the Norse Greenlanders encountered in North America

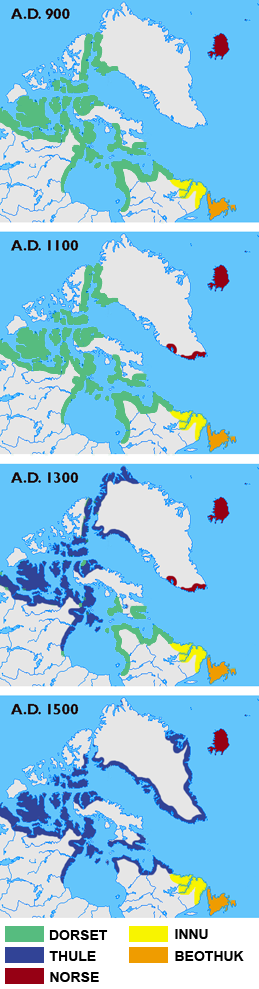
Maps showing the archaeological cultures of Greenland, Labrador, Newfoundland and the Canadian arctic islands in the years 900, 1100, 1300 and 1500. The green colour shows the Dorset Culture, blue the Thule Culture, red Norse Culture, yellow Innu and orange Beothuk

Skræling (Old Norse and Icelandic: skrælingi, plural skrælingjar) is the name the Norse Greenlanders used for the peoples they encountered in North America (Canada and Greenland). In surviving sources, it is first applied to the Thule people, the proto-Inuit group with whom the Norse coexisted in Greenland after about the 13th century. In the Icelandic sagas, it is also used for the peoples of the region known as Vinland whom the Norse encountered and fought during their expeditions there in the early 11th century.

== Etymology ==
The word may be related to the Old Norse word skrá, meaning "dried skin", in reference to the animal pelts worn by the Inuit. William Thalbitzer (1932: 14) speculated that skræling might have been derived from the Old Norse verb skrækja, meaning "bawl, shout, or yell". In modern Icelandic, skrælingi means "barbarian", whereas the Danish descendant, skrælling, means "weakling".

The term first appears in a document by Ari Thorgilsson, in his work Íslendingabók (The Book of the Icelanders), written well after the period in which Norse explorers made their first contacts with Indigenous Americans. By the time these sources were recorded, skræling was the common term Norse Greenlanders used for the Thule people, the ancestors to the modern Inuit. The Thule first arrived in Greenland from the North American mainland in the 13th century and were thereafter in contact with the Greenlanders. The Greenlanders' Saga and the Saga of Erik the Red, which were written in the 13th century, use this same term for the people of the area known as Vinland whom the Norse met in the early 11th century. The word subsequently became well known, and has been used in the English language since the 18th century.

"Kalaallit", the name of the largest ethnic group of Greenlandic Inuit, is probably derived from skræling. In 1750, Paul Egede mentions that the Inuit used "Inuit" among themselves, but used Kalaallit when speaking to foreigners, as this was the term used by Norse settlers.

== Norse exploration of the New World ==
Norse exploration of the New World began with the initial sighting of North America by an Icelander named Bjarni Herjólfsson, who spotted land after drifting off course on a journey to Greenland in 986.

They speculated among themselves as to what land this would be, for Bjarni said he suspected this was not Greenland.

His voyage piqued the interest of later explorers including Leif Eriksson, who would explore and name the areas of Helluland, Markland and Vinland.

== First contact ==
Leif laid the groundwork for later colonizing efforts by establishing a foothold on Vinland, where he constructed some "large houses". Upon his return to Greenland,

There was great discussion of Leif's Vinland voyage, and his brother Thorvald felt they had not explored enough of the land. Leif then told Thorvald, "You go to Vinland, brother, and take my ship if you wish, but before you do so I want the ship to make a trip to the skerry to fetch the wood that Thorir had there."

Thorvald had the first contact with the native population which would come to be known as the skrælings. After attacking and killing eight of the natives, they were attacked beside their beached ships, which they defended:

"I have been wounded under my arm," he said. "An arrow flew between the edge of the ship and the shield into my armpit. Here is the arrow, and this wound will cause my death."

== Thorfinn Karlsefni ==
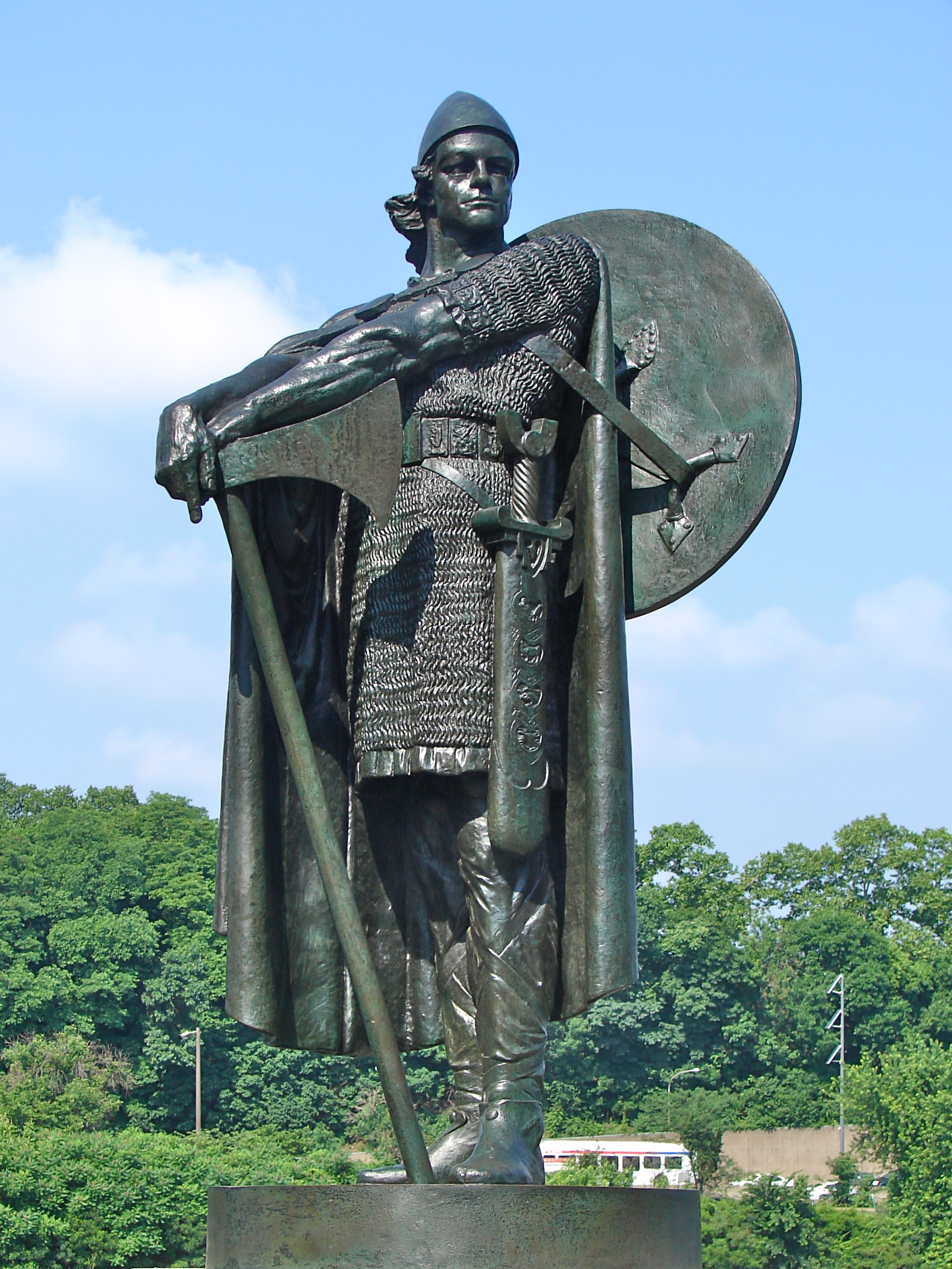
Statue of Thorfinn Karlsefni by Einar Jónsson in Philadelphia

Thorfinn Karlsefni was the first Norse explorer to attempt to truly colonize the newly discovered Vinland, on the same site as his predecessors Thorvald and Leif Eriksson. According to the Saga of Erik the Red, he set sail with three ships and 140 men.

Upon reaching Vinland, their intended destination, they found the now famous grapes and self-sown wheat for which the land was named. They spent a very hard winter at this site, barely surviving by fishing, hunting game inland, and gathering eggs on the island. The following summer they sailed to the island of Hóp where they had the first peaceful interactions with the native people, with whom they traded. Thorfinn forbade his men to trade their swords and spears, so they mainly exchanged red cloth for pelts. They described the aboriginal inhabitants:

They were short in height with threatening features and tangled hair on their heads. Their eyes were large and their cheeks broad.

Shortly thereafter, the Norsemen were attacked by natives frightened by a bull that broke loose from the Norse encampment. They were forced to retreat to a more defensible location before engaging their attackers; at the end of the battle two of his men had been slain, while "many of the natives" were killed. As with any inhabited foreign land, Thorfinn and his men realized that

despite everything the land had to offer there, they would be under constant threat of attack from its prior inhabitants.

After this adventure, they returned to Greenland. Their three-year excursion would be the longest lasting known European colony in the New World, until Columbus's voyages nearly 500 years later initiated full-scale European conquest of the Americas.

== Inuit folktales of the Norse ==
There are also accounts from the Inuit:

[S]oon the kayaker sent out his spear in good earnest, and killed [the Norseman] on the spot. When winter came, it was a general belief that the Kavdlunait would come and avenge the death of their countrymen

Kavdlunait (plural) was the Inuit word for foreigner or European. Compare modern Greenlandic qallunaaq ("Dane"), formerly spelled ĸavdlunâĸ.

== See also ==
- L'Anse aux Meadows
- Greenland
- Newfoundland and Labrador
- Skraeling Island
- Thule people
