= Norse settlement of North America =

Earliest phase of European settlement in the Americas

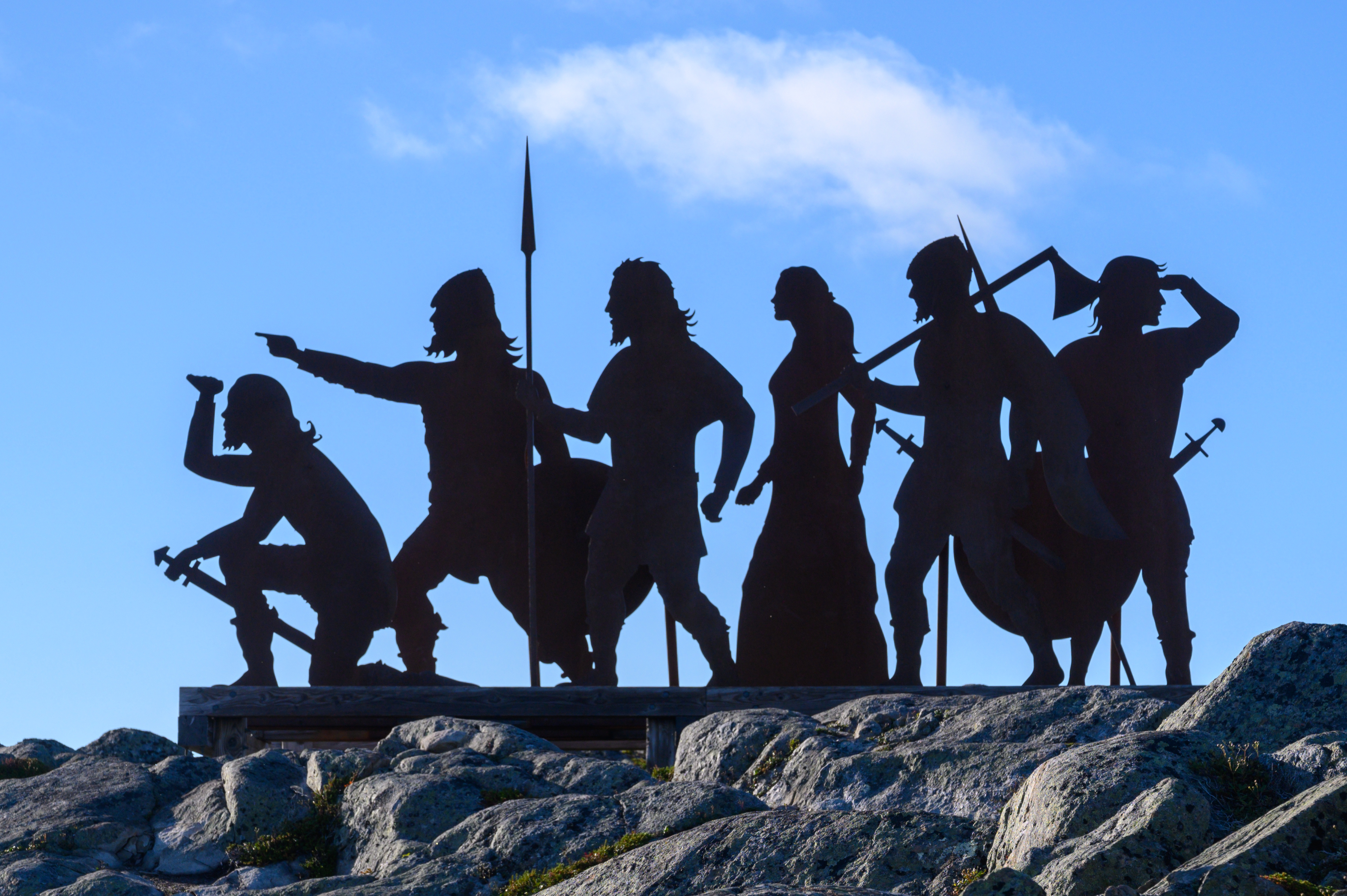
Norse silhouette sculpture above L'Anse aux Meadows, Newfoundland, Canada

The Norse settlement of North America, including Greenland, began in the late 10th century AD and lasted for about 500 years. Further west, the evidence is more limited. Only one Canadian settlement has been confirmed: L'Anse aux Meadows in Newfoundland. There is evidence of Norse activity in other parts of Canada, but no trace of the long-term farming colonies found in Greenland. In the present-day United States, there are no confirmed remains. Claimed US discoveries are hoaxes or mistaken identifications.

Settlements on Greenland's western coast peaked at a population of 2,000 to 3,000, sustained by pastoral farming on scattered coastal fjords and exports, mainly of walrus ivory, to Europe. For timber and iron, colonists launched expeditions into the Canadian Arctic and likely into the Gulf of St. Lawrence. L'Anse aux Meadows, dating to around 1021 AD, was capable of housing between 30 and 160 people. Its lack of stables, farms, and cemeteries indicates it probably functioned as an overwintering base and ship-repair station rather than a permanent community. Wood fragments and butternuts in the Norse remains were from plants not native to Newfoundland, suggesting expeditions to the continental mainland.

The Norse presence on the mainland was short-lived. Scholars suggest that the population pressure that drove colonists from Europe to Iceland and then from Iceland to Greenland never manifested in the sparsely populated Greenlandic colonies. By the 15th century, the Greenland colonies themselves were gradually abandoned due to economic hardship, isolation, lower seal populations, the climatic cooling of the Little Ice Age, and sea level rise in the fjords.

The primary sources for descriptions of these voyages are the Vinland sagas, heroic sagas first written down in Iceland centuries after the events. After European exploration of North America began following the Voyages of Christopher Columbus, it was debated whether the lands from the sagas (Helluland, Markland, and Vinland) corresponded to real places. By the mid-20th century, this debate had produced a range of scholarly and antiquarian theories to explain and locate Vinland. Additionally, nationalist, pseudoscientific, and pseudohistorical theories have emerged around the sagas over the centuries. In the 1960s, archaeologists found Norse remains on the northern tip of Newfoundland. No other Norse settlements have been conclusively identified in Canada or elsewhere on the North American mainland. Possible evidence of Norse contact with the Indigenous peoples comes from a genetic lineage now carried by some Icelanders, likely introduced by a Native American.

== Norse Greenland ==
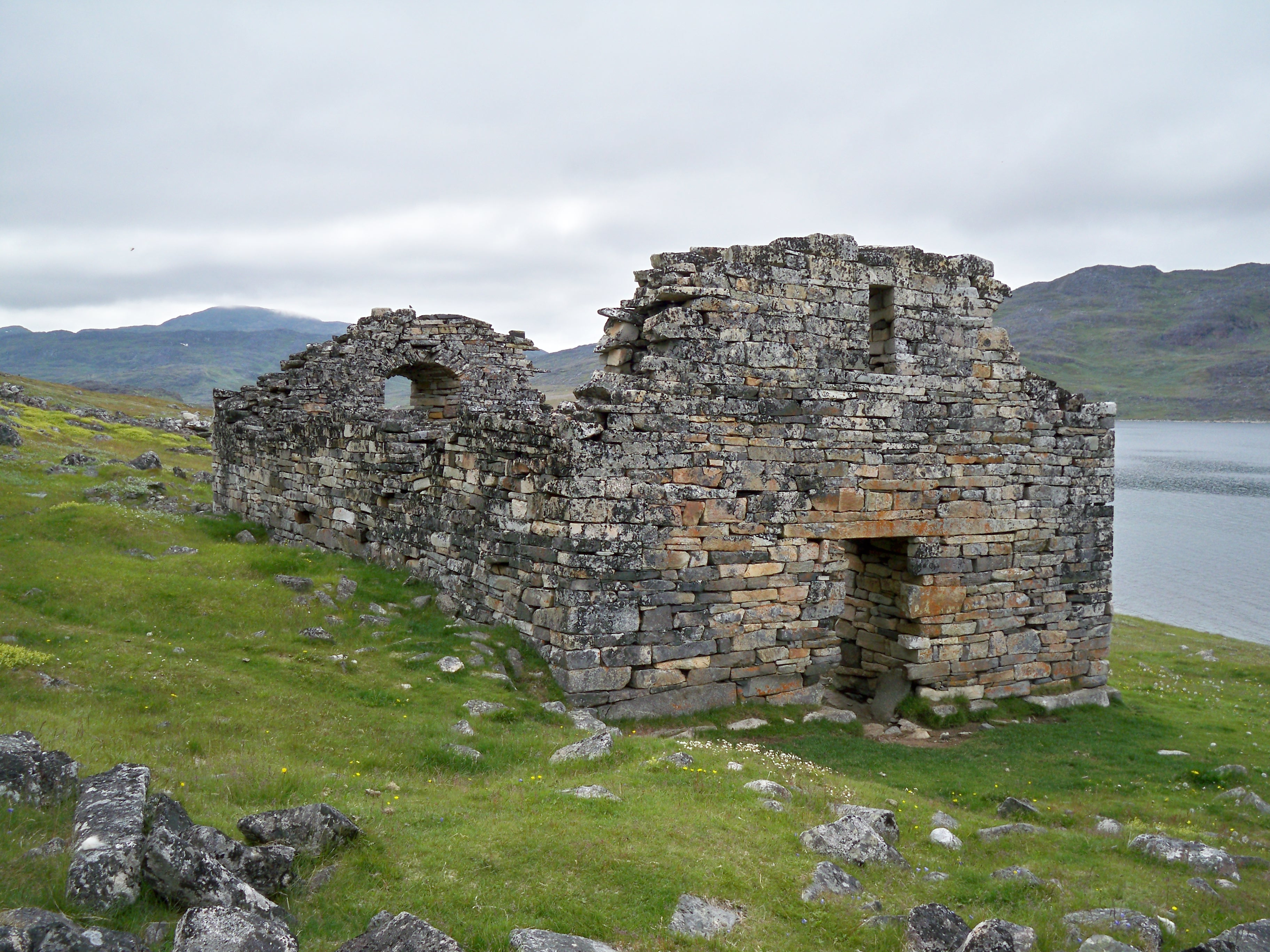
Hvalsey Church ruins in Greenland

=== Icelandic sagas ===
The Vinland sagas (the Saga of the Greenlanders and the Saga of Erik the Red) cover Norse explorations into the Western Atlantic. They are heroic Icelandic sagas originally shared orally and written down during the 13th and 14th centuries, long after the events they detail. Written according to the expectations of their medieval audience, they portray Greenland as a place at the edge of the world where people were exiled and tested. This limits their reliability as historical records.

The earliest mention of Greenland in the sagas is a group of rocky islands in the Atlantic reported by Gunnbjörn Ulfsson when his ship was blown off course from Iceland in the early 900s. Named after him, Gunnbjarnarsker or "Gunnbjörn's skerries", were likely near modern-day Kulusuk just off the eastern coast of Greenland, but their exact location is unknown. In his official 14th-century report for the Catholic church, Ívar Bárðarson wrote that the skerries were about "two days and two nights sailing due West" from Iceland and the halfway point on trips to the later more successful colonies on the western coast. According to the Landnámabók, Snæbjörn Galti led the earliest recorded intentional Norse voyage to Greenland and started a failed settlement on the eastern coast of Greenland. The colony struggled: Snæbjörn Galti was murdered, the settlement was abandoned, and only two colonists survived the return to Iceland.

According to the sagas, Erik the Red was banished from Iceland for three years after killing several men, and he sailed westward to the lands reported by Gunnbjorn in the late tenth century. His crew continued past the skerries, along the coast of Greenland, and settled on an island near Tunulliarfik Fjord; he named the fjord "Erik's Fjord" after himself. He remained for three years, explored the area, and decided to found a settlement. He named the area Greenland, and returned to Iceland to recruit settlers, promising tracts of land to his followers. Erik established his estate Brattahlíð along the inner reaches of Eiriksfjord.

=== Life ===
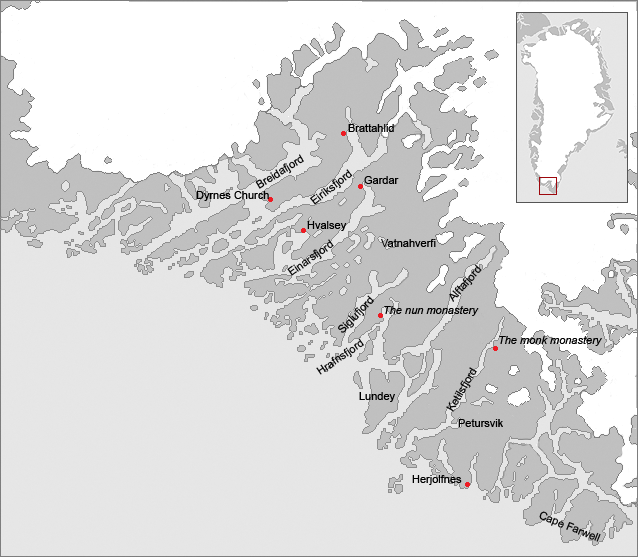
A map of the Eastern Settlement on Greenland, covering approximately the modern municipality of Kujalleq. Eiriksfjord (Erik's fjord) and his farm Brattahlíð are shown, as is the location of the bishopric at Gardar.

Norse Greenland consisted of two main settlements: the Eastern Settlement at the southwestern tip of Greenland, and the Western Settlement about 500 kilometres (310 mi) up the west coast, near present-day Nuuk. A smaller settlement later founded near the Eastern Settlement is sometimes called the Middle Settlement. The combined population peaked around 2,000–3,000. Archaeologists have identified about 500 farms from the larger Eastern Settlement.

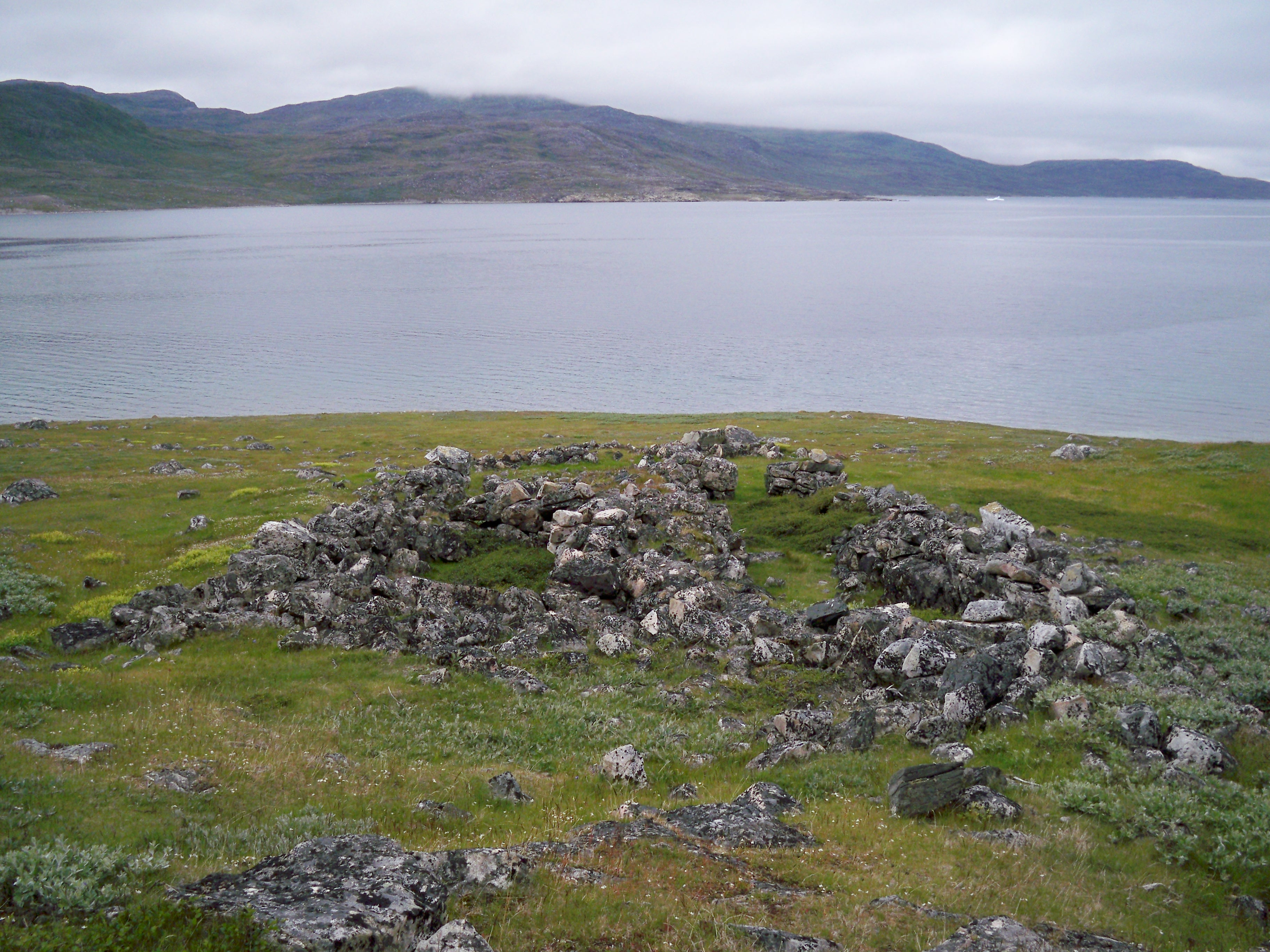
Remains of stables on Greenland

Norse Greenlanders lived along scattered fjords that provided habitable land for their animals (such as cattle, sheep, goats, dogs, and cats) and arable land to farm. In these fjords, the farms depended upon stables (byres) to house their livestock in the winter, and farmers routinely culled their herds so that their remaining livestock could survive the season. During the warmer season, livestock were taken from their byres to pastures, the most fertile being controlled by the most powerful farms and the church. What was produced by livestock and farming was supplemented with subsistence hunting of mainly seal and caribou as well as walrus for trade. The Norse mainly relied on the Nordrsetur hunt, a communal hunt of migratory harp seals in the spring.

There is evidence of Norse trade with the Thule, the ancestors of the Inuit, and the Beothuk, related to the Algonquin. The Norse called these peoples the Skrælingjar. The Dorset people had withdrawn from Greenland before the Norse settlement of the island. Items such as comb fragments, pieces of iron cooking utensils and chisels, chess pieces, ship rivets, carpenter's planes, and oaken ship fragments used in Inuit boats have been found far beyond the traditional range of Norse colonization. A small ivory figurine that appears to represent a Norseman has also been found among the ruins of an Inuit community house.

Trade was highly important to the Greenland Norse, who used imported lumber because of the barrenness of the land. In turn they exported walrus ivory and hide, polar bear skins, and narwhal tusks. Ultimately, these exchanges were vulnerable as they relied on migratory patterns affected by climate changes as well as on the viability of the few fjords on the island. Norse Greenland settlements persisted into the Little Ice Age when the overall climate became cooler and more humid. A cooling climate and increasing precipitation brought more storms, longer winters, shorter springs, and less predictable harp seal migrations. Pasture space began to dwindle and fodder yields for the winter became much smaller. Combined with regular herd culling, this made it hard to maintain livestock, especially for the poorest of the Greenland Norse. Closer to the Eastern Settlement, temperatures remained stable but a prolonged drought reduced fodder production. In spring, the voyages to where migratory harp seals could be found became more dangerous because of more frequent storms, and the lower population of harp seals meant that Nordrsetur hunts became less successful, making subsistence hunting extremely difficult. The strain on resources made trade difficult, and as time went on, Greenland exports lost value due to waning European interest and competition from other countries. Trade in African elephant ivory competed with the trade in walrus tusks that provided income to Greenland, and there is evidence that walrus over-hunting, particularly of the males with larger tusks, led to walrus population declines.

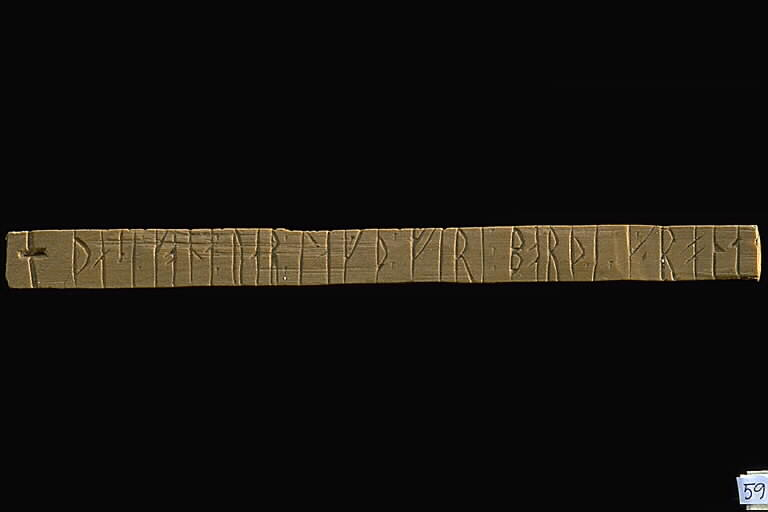
A runestick from Herjolfsnes (Note: In memory of Gudveg who died at sea, it reads: "This woman, whose name was Gudveg, was laid overboard in the Greenland Sea.")

In 1126, the population requested a bishop (headquartered at a bishopric established in Garðar), and in 1261, they accepted the overlordship of the Norwegian king. They continued to have their own law and became almost completely politically independent after 1349, the time of the Black Death. In 1380, the Kingdom of Norway entered into a personal union with the Kingdom of Denmark.

The settlements began to decline in the 14th century. The Western Settlement was abandoned around 1350. Less is known about life in the Middle Settlement, but radiocarbon dating indicates that it was likely inhabited for most of the period that the Eastern Settlement was inhabited, and archaeologists have found evidence of one house in use potentially as late as 1409. It is probable that the Eastern Settlement was defunct by the late 15th century. The most recent radiocarbon date found in Norse settlements as of 2002 was 1430 (±15 years). The last bishop at Garðar died in 1377. After a marriage was recorded in 1408, no written records mention the settlers. Several theories have been advanced to explain the decline.

=== Climate and decline ===
Map showing the expansion of the Thule people (900 to 1500)

The Little Ice Age of this period made travel between Greenland and Europe, as well as farming, more difficult. Although the hunting of seal and other animals provided a healthy diet, there was more prestige in cattle farming, and there was increased availability of farms in Scandinavian countries depopulated by famine and plague epidemics. In addition, Greenlandic ivory may have been supplanted in European markets by cheaper ivory from Africa. Despite the loss of contact with the Greenlanders, Denmark–Norway continued to consider Greenland a dependency.

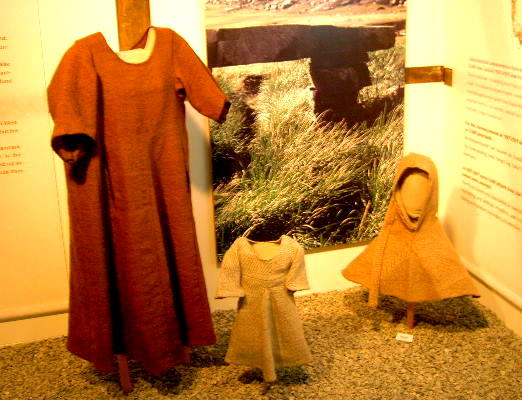
Replica garments of those found in graves in Herjolfsness, Greenland

To some extent, it seemed that the Norse were unwilling to integrate with the Thule people of Greenland, through either marriage or culture. There is evidence of contact as seen through the Thule archaeological record, including ivory depictions of the Norse as well as bronze and steel artifacts. In the 20th century, there was little evidence for Thule artifacts among Norse habitations. However, it is now known that Thule artifacts are found among Norse habitations, indicating that both groups acquired material goods from each other. The older research posited that it was not climate change alone that led to Norse decline, but also their unwillingness to adapt. For example, if the Norse had decided to focus their subsistence hunting on the ringed seal (which could be hunted year round, though individually), and decided to reduce or do away with their communal hunts, food would have been much less scarce during the winter season. Also, had Norse individuals used skins instead of wool for their clothing, they would have fared better nearer to the coast, and would not have been as confined to the fjords.

However, more recent research has shown that the Norse did try to adapt in their own ways. This included increased subsistence hunting. A significant number of bones of marine animals can be found at the settlements, suggesting increased hunting with the absence of farmed food. In addition, pollen records show that the Norse did not always devastate the small forests and foliage, as previously thought. Instead they ensured that overgrazed or overused sections were given time to regrow and moved to other areas. Norse farmers also attempted to adapt; with the increased need for winter fodder and smaller pastures, they would self-fertilize their lands to try to keep up with the new demands caused by the changing climate. Current research suggests that the Norse were unable to maintain their settlements because of economic and climatic change happening at the same time.

Sea level rose up to 3.3 metres (11 ft) near the Norse settlements in Greenland during their decline. Falling temperatures increased the mass of the Greenland ice sheet, and the ice gradually pressed the land down. The increasing gravity of the ice sheet pulled the oceans farther over the subsiding land. Coastlines retreated hundreds of meters inland, and sites near the coast would have faced extensive flooding. A 2023 study concluded: "Sea-level change thus represents an integral, missing element of the Viking story."

== Norse settlements in Canada ==
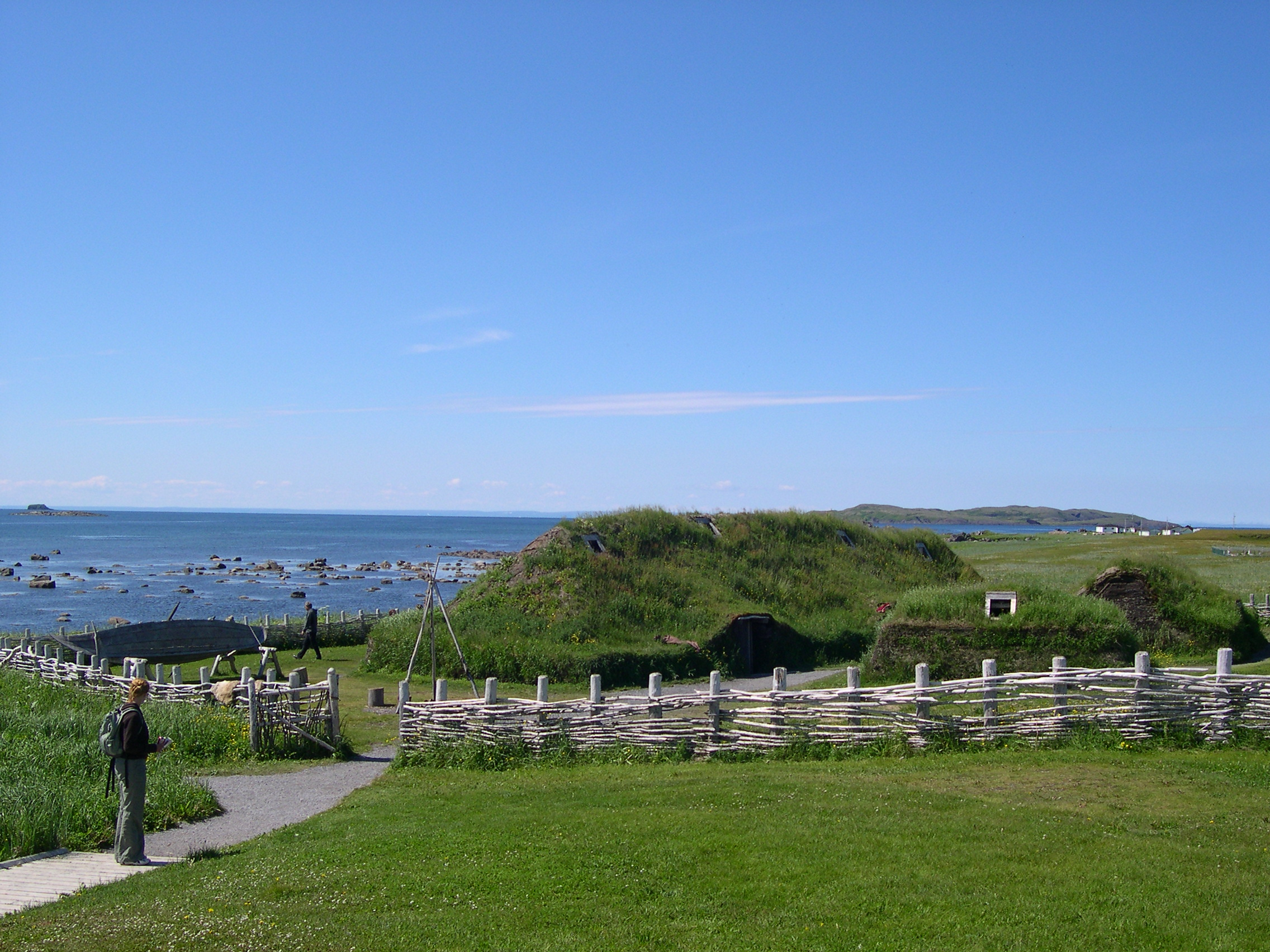
A reconstruction of Norse buildings at the UNESCO listed L'Anse aux Meadows site in Newfoundland, Canada. Archaeological evidence demonstrates that iron working, carpentry, and boat repair were conducted at the site.

Greenland lacked natural resources like forests and iron ore. The Greenlanders' oral history, recorded in the Saga of the Greenlanders and Saga of Erik the Red, mentions several places to the south or west that could supplement what was available on Greenland, notably Markland, Helluland, and Vinland. There is generally believed to be a historical basis for Norse voyages to these places, despite some fantastical elements in the sagas, such as Great Ireland and the uniped who kills Thorvald Eiriksson in Vinland. In Adam of Bremen's 11th-century chronicle Gesta Hammaburgensis ecclesiae pontificum, he briefly mentions Greenland and islands beyond Norway including one "called Vinland". (Note: "In the ocean there are very many other islands of which not the least is Greenland, situated far out in the ocean opposite the mountains of Sweden and the Rhiphaean range. [...] He spoke also of yet another island of the many found in that ocean. It is called Vinland because vines producing excellent wine grow wild there. That unsown crops also abound on that island we have ascertained not from fabulous reports but from the trustworthy relation of the Danes. Beyond that island, he said, no habitable land is found in that ocean, but every place beyond it is full of impenetrable ice and intense darkness.") Icelandic annals record that, in 1347, a ship arrived from Greenland that had drifted off course while sailing to Markland for wood. An Icelandic description of the world written circa 1300 gives the rough order of the lands described in the sagas as Greenland, Helluland, Markland, and Vinland, which the author suspected was part of Africa. (Note: "In the outermost part of Italy, we find Apulia, which northern peoples call Pulsland. In middle Italy lies Romaborg. North in Italy is Langobardia, which we call Langbardaland. North of the mountains in the east, lies Saxland, and to the southwest, Fracland. Hyspania, which we refer to as Spanland, is a grand kingdom to the south, stretching down to the Mediterranean, between Langbardaland and Fracland. Rin [the Rhine] is a huge river running from Mundia in the north, in between Saxland and Fracland. Near the mouth of the Rhine lies Frisland, to the north by the sea. North of Saxland we find Danmork. The ocean swells into Austrveg (Østersjøen) by Denmark. Sviþjóð is east of Denmark; Noregr to the north. In the north of Norway lies Finnmörk. From here the coast bends towards the northeast and then to the east to Bjarmaland, which pays taxes to the kings of Garda. From Bjarmaland there is unbuilt land (löndobygd) stretching north up to where Grænland begins. Past Grænland, to the south, is Helluland, past which lies Markland, and from there it is not far to Vinland, which some people still believe is connected to Africa. England and Scotland are one island, but each a kingdom of their own. Írland is a great island. Ísland is also a large island, north of Ireland. All these countries belong to the part of the world called Europe.") In Europe, several medieval works reproduced this general description in cities as far away as Milan, where the Dominican chronicler Galvano Fiamma mentioned terra que dicitur Marckalada 'the land called Markland' west of Greenland circa 1345. Where these places would correspond to in modern-day Canada is still debated.

Greenland colonists used timber for their boats and homes, so they likely made many unrecorded trips south for wood. Microscopic analysis of wood used on Greenland shows that many families relied on driftwood and the sparse local trees, while the larger farms sourced lumber from Europe and North America. The Icelandic archaeologist Lísabet Guðmundsdóttir studied over 8,500 wood remains from five Norse sites in Greenland, and she determined that eight pieces had been clearly imported from North America: one hemlock piece and seven jack pine, which "can be distinguished from Scots pine by the ray tracheids". In total, the study found 26 pieces (0.26% of the total sample of 8,552) that could not be attributed to Greenlandic plants or to driftwood, which was widely used in Norse Greenland and Iceland. This included oak, which may have been imported from either mainland North America or, more likely, from Northern Europe. Dates from the remains indicated that the Norse had been using wood from North America longer than previously thought.

Bog iron was widely used and smelted in forges on Greenland, but because no ores were present near the Eastern or Western Settlements, the iron had to be shipped from Labrador, Newfoundland, Iceland, or Europe. One indicator that iron was being extracted from North America rather than imported from the east was the usage of porous iron and slag blooms. Iron shipped from the east would likely have been products (tools, nails, axes) or iron bars.

=== Newfoundland ===
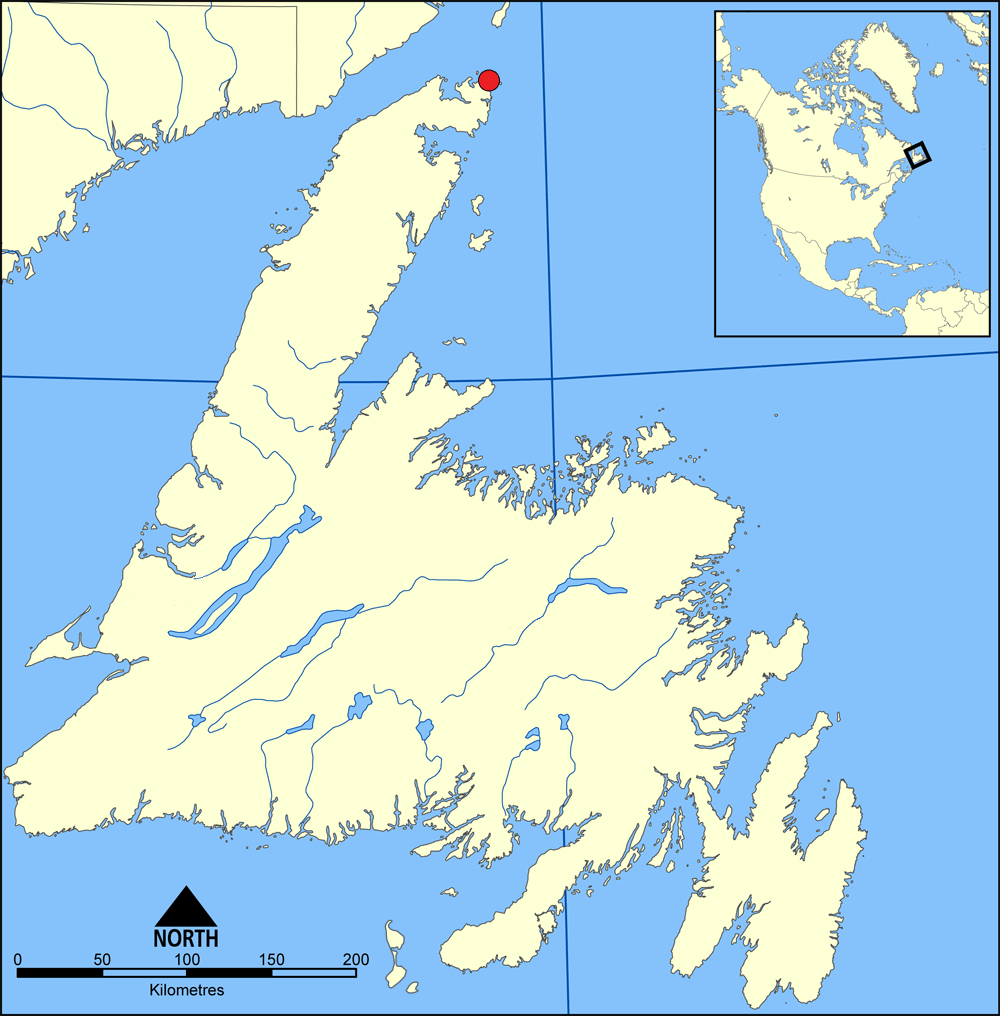
The location of L'Anse aux Meadows in Newfoundland

Evidence of the Norse west of Greenland came in the 1960s when the archaeologist Anne Stine Ingstad and the author Helge Ingstad excavated what proved to be a Norse site at L'Anse aux Meadows in Newfoundland. They found a bronze, ring-headed pin like those the Norse used to fasten their cloaks inside the cooking pit of one of the larger dwellings. A stone oil lamp and a small spindle whorl, used to maintain the spindle's speed of rotation while spinning fiber, were found inside another building. A fragment of a bone needle was discovered in the firepit of a third dwelling. It may have been used for nålebinding, a needlework technique predating knitting. Much slag, formed as a by-product from the smelting and working of iron, was found on the site along with many iron boat nails or rivets.

The site is different from the colonies in Greenland; it was not a permanent continuous settlement. Archaeologists have found no burials, no farmland, no stables for livestock, and a near absence of soapstone, which was widely used by the Greenlanders for household tools.

Birgitta Wallace noted that the site's location and building types "suggests that seafaring was the most important function of the settlement". The buildings include several large living halls and specialized workshops including one for boat repair and construction. According to historian Eleanor Barraclough, one major purpose of the site was boat repair. The land is bare and open now, but it was forested during the time the Norse were active. The presence of wood and nuts from the Juglans cinerea walnut tree, which grows wild on the continental mainland but not Newfoundland itself, indicates that the site was used as a staging area for further voyages.

Trees at L'Anse aux Meadows were felled by the Norse in 1021. Chunks of wood from the site were dated in 2021 using the 993–994 carbon-14 spike and tree rings. This provided the first certain date for the Norse presence at the site. Although not inhabited for long stretches of time, the site may have been used as late as 1145 AD. When they left, the Norse deliberately abandoned the site, leaving behind no tools and mostly waste.

Greenland had a limited population to found further settlements on the scale of L'Anse aux Meadows. That site alone may have drawn 10 to 20 percent of the total Greenland colonists. The communal living halls could hold from 30 to 160 people. Point Rosee was identified by the archaeologist Sarah Parcak as a possible Norse settlement on the basis of near-infrared satellite images and high-resolution aerial photographs, but excavations in 2015 and 2016 showed no signs of Norse occupation. What appeared from the sky to be a turf wall was determined to be the result of natural processes.

=== Baffin Island ===
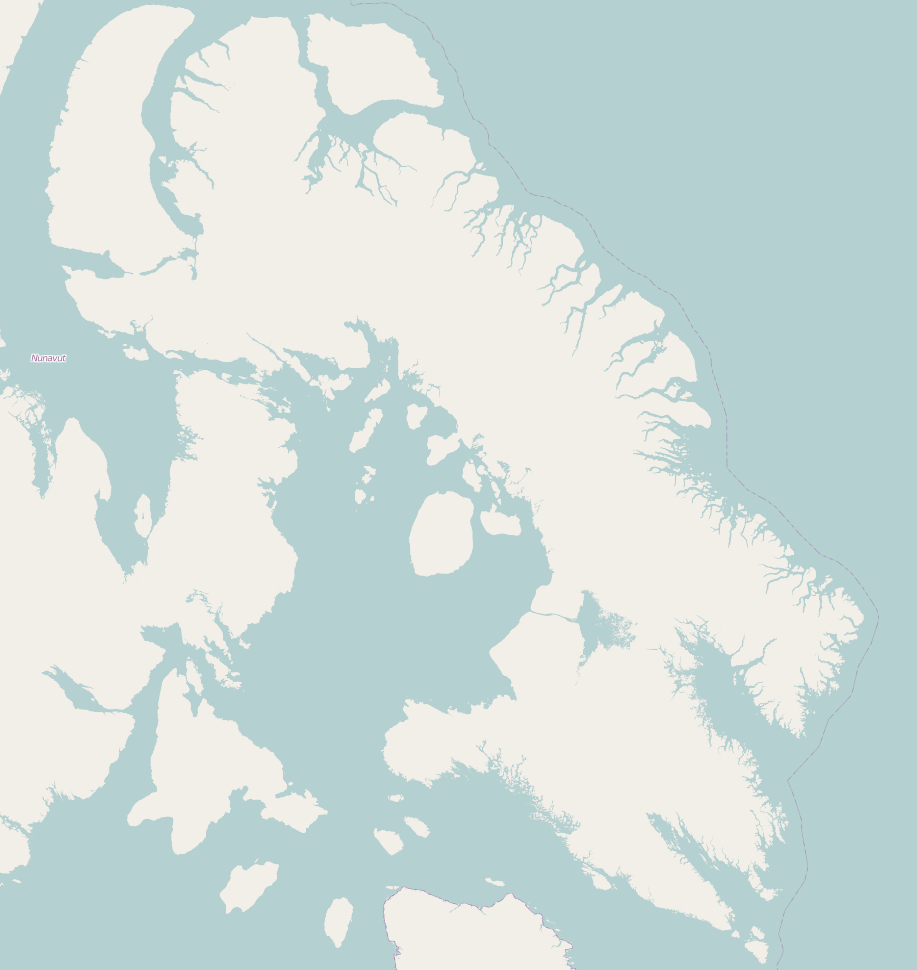
Locations of possible Norse artifacts or ruins on Baffin Island

Baffin Island lies directly west of Norse sites in Greenland, and it is likely the Helluland of Norse oral history. Canadian researchers have studied possible Norse outposts on and around Baffin Island, notably around a structure in Nanook, also known as Tanfield Valley. Moreau Maxwell described a ruined stone and sod building at Nanook as "very difficult to interpret" in the 1960s.

A team led by the archaeologist Patricia Sutherland excavated the structure and found possible Norse artifacts, including whalebone shovels similar to ones from the Greenland colonies, wooden tally sticks, and Old World rat fur. Partially because its stones were cut in a European fashion, Sutherland also suspected the building itself was Norse. Radiocarbon dating could not conclusively identify the site as it had been occupied and abandoned several times.

At Nanook, Sutherland's team found whetstones used to sharpen blades. Metal fragments in the whetstone included bronze, brass, and smelted iron in the medieval European metallurgy style. A stone crucible there had once used very high heat to melt down metal alloys like bronze. While there is no evidence for Indigenous North Americans smelting alloys, the Norse regularly did. Radiocarbon dating placed the crucible broadly between 754 BC and 1367 AD, and Sutherland said, "It may be the earliest evidence of high-temperature nonferrous metalworking in North America to the north of what is now Mexico."

Researchers also suspected yarn from Willows Island and Nunguvik (near Pond Inlet) to be Norse, but later dating found the yarn to be Dorset in origin. Despite early theories that the Norse introduced the practice of spinning thread to the native peoples, a 2018 study demonstrated an Indigenous spinning tradition. The Willows Island yarn dates to between 15 BC and 725 AD, possibly made from Arctic hare or muskox. Unlike European cordage, Dorset yarn was spun at a consistent diameter and was never woven into fabric.

=== Labrador ===
Avayalik Islands off the coast of Labrador

Researchers have found evidence for some Norse contact with Labrador, but not for settlements. When Martin Frobisher explored Labrador in the 1570s, the native peoples relayed their oral history of the kablunat ('white men') whose behaviors and customs resembled those of the Norse. The colonists in Greenland regularly used timber for houses and boats, and the most viable logging sites from Greenland were the heavily forested coasts of northern Labrador. Labrador also contained bog iron ore and nearby timber to supply charcoal as fuel for its smelting. An arrowhead excavated from the Sandnæs farmstead in Greenland resembled neither Norse nor Inuit arrows, but it matched the arrows used by the Indigenous Point Revenge culture in southern Labrador.

Additionally, genetic evidence suggests direct contact. Scientists who studied Icelanders' mitochondrial DNA in 2010 concluded that a lineage found there most likely came from an Indigenous eastern Canadian woman brought to Iceland around the year 1000, though an Asian or European origin could not be ruled out.

Norse materials have not been found in Native American archaeological sites in mainland Labrador, which indicates a lack of trading and a low possibility that Norse sites as large as L'Anse aux Meadows will be found beyond Newfoundland. Patrick Plumet led many coastal surveys west of Labrador in Ungava Bay during the 1970s and 1980s that searched for but found no evidence of Norse settlement. On the Avayalik Islands, off the very northern tip of Labrador, Patricia Sutherland found yarn that was distinct from the sinew-based cordage typically used by Indigenous Arctic hunters. Though she initially suspected this to be Norse, further studies showed evidence for the Dorset spinning their own cordage and trading in a network that included the Norse, but not for a Norse settlement on the island.

=== Vinland sagas ===
According to the Icelandic sagas—Saga of Erik the Red, plus chapters of the Hauksbók and the Flatey Book—the Norse started to explore lands to the west of Greenland only a few years after the Greenland settlements were established. In the 980s, a merchant named Bjarni Herjólfsson left Iceland to meet his father in the Greenland colonies but was blown off course. He became lost in a fog for days, until sighting land to the west. The flat and forested land matched no description of Greenland, so Bjarni sailed north and ultimately did reach the colonies. He was interested only in finding his father's farm but described his findings to Leif Erikson, who explored the area in more detail and started a small settlement fifteen years later.

The sagas describe three areas beyond Greenland: Helluland, "land of the flat stones"; Markland, "the land of forests"; and Vinland, either "the land of wine" or "the land of meadows". Helluland is generally thought to correspond to Baffin Island but may include northern areas of Labrador. Markland is generally thought to be an area in Labrador. Vinland likely includes Newfoundland and possibly other areas around the Gulf of Saint Lawrence. There has long been debate about identifying any of the three "lands" to actual, known locations in North America. Vinland in particular has been the topic of widely divergent claims and theories.

In 2019, the archaeologist Birgitta Wallace wrote:

L'Anse aux Meadows cannot be Vinland. Vinland was a land, the same way Iceland and Greenland are lands, countries. But L'Anse aux Meadows is a place described in the sagas as part of Vinland. It is the Straumfjord of Eric's Saga. It is the same kind of settlement, with the same kind of occupants and type of activities, a winter base from where expeditions went south in the summer. Although artifacts and buildings are typically Norse, the layout, location, and artifacts are different from the sites we know elsewhere in the Norse world. Just such a site is described in the sagas: Straumsfjord. A compelling reason why L'Anse aux Meadows has to be the main site in Vinland lies in demography.

== Historiography ==
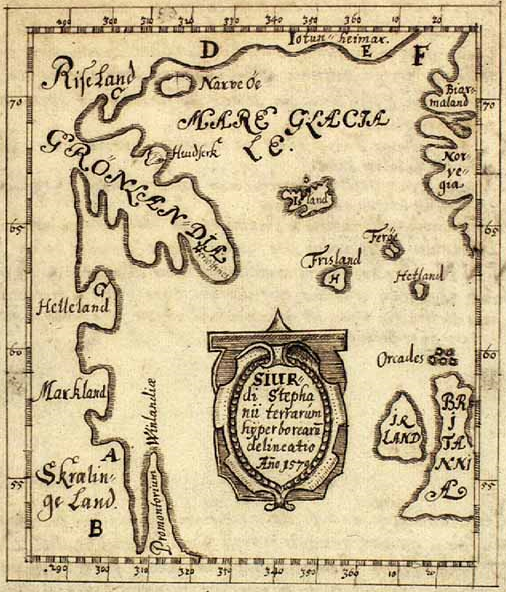
The Skálholt Map showing Latinized Norse placenames in the North Atlantic (Note: Latinized placenames: Iotun-heimar (Jötunheimr); Riseland (Land of the Risi); Grönlandia (Greenland); Helleland (Helluland); Markland; Skrælinge Land (Land of the Skræling); Promontorium Winlandiæ (Promontory of Vinland))

For centuries, it remained unclear whether the Icelandic sagas represented real voyages by the Norse to North America. Although the idea of Norse voyages to, and a colony in, North America was discussed by the Swiss scholar Paul Henri Mallet in his book Northern Antiquities (English translation 1770), the sagas first gained widespread attention in 1837 when the Danish antiquarian Carl Christian Rafn revived the idea of a Viking presence in North America. North America, by the name Winland, first appeared in written sources in a work by Adam of Bremen from approximately 1075. The most important works about North America and the early Norse activities there, namely the sagas of Icelanders, were recorded in the 13th and 14th centuries. The Norse sites were depicted in the Skálholt Map, made by an Icelandic teacher in 1570 and depicting part of northeastern North America and mentioning Helluland, Markland and Vinland.

Locations proposed
Theorist	Helluland	Markland	Vinland
Carl Christian Rafn (1837)	Labrador or Newfoundland	Nova Scotia	Cape Cod
Gustav Storm (1887)	Labrador	Newfoundland	Nova Scotia
William Henry Babcock (1913)	Labrador	Newfoundland	Nova Scotia (Note: "Wineland seems to have been understood as beginning with Cape Breton, below the Strait of Cabot, and extending a long way southward.")
William Hovgaard (1914)	Baffin Island or Newfoundland	Labrador or Nova Scotia	Cape Cod area, south shore.
Hans Peder Steensby (1918)	Labrador	Labrador	New England or New Brunswick
G. M. Gathorne-Hardy (1921)	Labrador or Newfoundland	Nova Scotia	Cape Cod
Matthías Þórðarson (1929)	Labrador	Labrador	New England or New Brunswick
Halldór Hermansson (1936)	Northern Labrador	Southern Labrador	New England
John R. Swanton (1947)	Northern Labrador	Southern Labrador	New England
Discovery of the L'Anse aux Meadows Viking settlement (1960)
Tryggvi J. Oleson (1963)	Baffin Island	Labrador	Cape Cod
Johannes Kr. Tornoe (1964)	Baffin Island	Labrador	Waquoit Bay, Cape Cod
M. Magnusson and H. Palsson (1965)	Baffin Island or northern Labrador	Southern Labrador or Newfoundland	New England
John R. L. Anderson (1967)	Baffin Island or northern Labrador	Southern Labrador	Martha's Vineyard, Mass.
Carl O. Sauer (1968)	Baffin Island	Southern Labrador or Newfoundland	Southern New England, Buzzard Bay or west.
Anne Stine Ingstad (1969)	Baffin Island	Labrador	L'Anse aux Meadows
Samuel Eliot Morison (1971)	Baffin Island	Labrador	L'Anse aux Meadows
Erik Wahlgren (1986)	Baffin Island	Labrador or Newfoundland	Bay of Fundy area
Birgitta L. Wallace (1991)	Baffin Island	Labrador	Newfoundland and New Brunswick
Pall Bergthorsson (1997)	Baffin Island	Labrador	Saint Lawrence Estuary
Robert Kellogg (2000)	Baffin Island or Labrador	Southern Labrador	St. Lawrence Valley or New England

== Pseudohistory ==
While there is no physical evidence of Norse settlements in North America except for Greenland and the far east of Canada, other so-called discoveries have been proposed and rejected by scholars. Unsubstantiated claims of Norse colonization are especially common in New England.

Supposed physical evidence has been found to be deliberately falsified or historically baseless, often to promote a political agenda. Literary critic Annette Kolodny criticized attempts to evoke what she termed "plastic vikings". These were fictional characters treated as historical figures, but "depicted variously as heroic warriors and empire builders, barbarous berserker invaders, fighters for freedom, courageous explorers, would-be colonists, seamen and merchants, poets and saga men, glorious ancestors, bloodthirsty pagan pirates, and civilized Christian converts" depending on the speaker or author. Purported runestones have been found in North America, most famously the Kensington Runestone. These are generally considered forgeries or misinterpretations of Native American petroglyphs. Gordon Campbell's book Norse America, published in 2021, presents his thesis that despite the "fleeting and ill-documented" Norse presence, the idea that Vikings "discovered America" quickly seduced Americans of northern European Protestant descent, some of whom went on to deliberately manufacture evidence to support it.

Monuments claimed to be Norse include:

- Stone Tower in Newport, Rhode Island
- Viking Altar Rock
- Spirit Pond runestones
- AVM Runestone
- Hammer of Thor (monument)
- Bourne Stone
- Narragansett Runestone
- Maine penny
- Ulen sword
- Beardmore Relics
- Oklahoma runestones
- The petroglyphs on Dighton Rock, from the Taunton River in Massachusetts

=== Horsford's Norumbega ===
The nineteenth-century Harvard chemist Eben Norton Horsford connected the Charles River Basin to places described in the Norse sagas and elsewhere, notably Norumbega. He published several books on the topic and had a range of memorials created in New England to his supposed Viking past, including the bronze Leif Erikson statue in Boston, Massachusetts. His work received little support from mainstream historians and archeologists at the time, and even less today.

Other nineteenth-century writers, such as Horsford's friend Thomas Gold Appleton in A Sheaf of Papers (1875) and George Perkins Marsh in The Goths in New England, also seized upon false notions of Viking expansion to promote white superiority and oppose the Catholic Church. Such misuse of Viking history and imagery reemerged in the twentieth century among some groups promoting white supremacy. The historian Carlo Rotella coined the term "pulp history" to describe Horsford's pseudo-historical writing, comparing its origin and appeal to the pulp fiction histories invented by the pulp author Robert E. Howard's Hyborian Age, the setting of the Conan the Barbarian stories.

=== Kensington Runestone ===
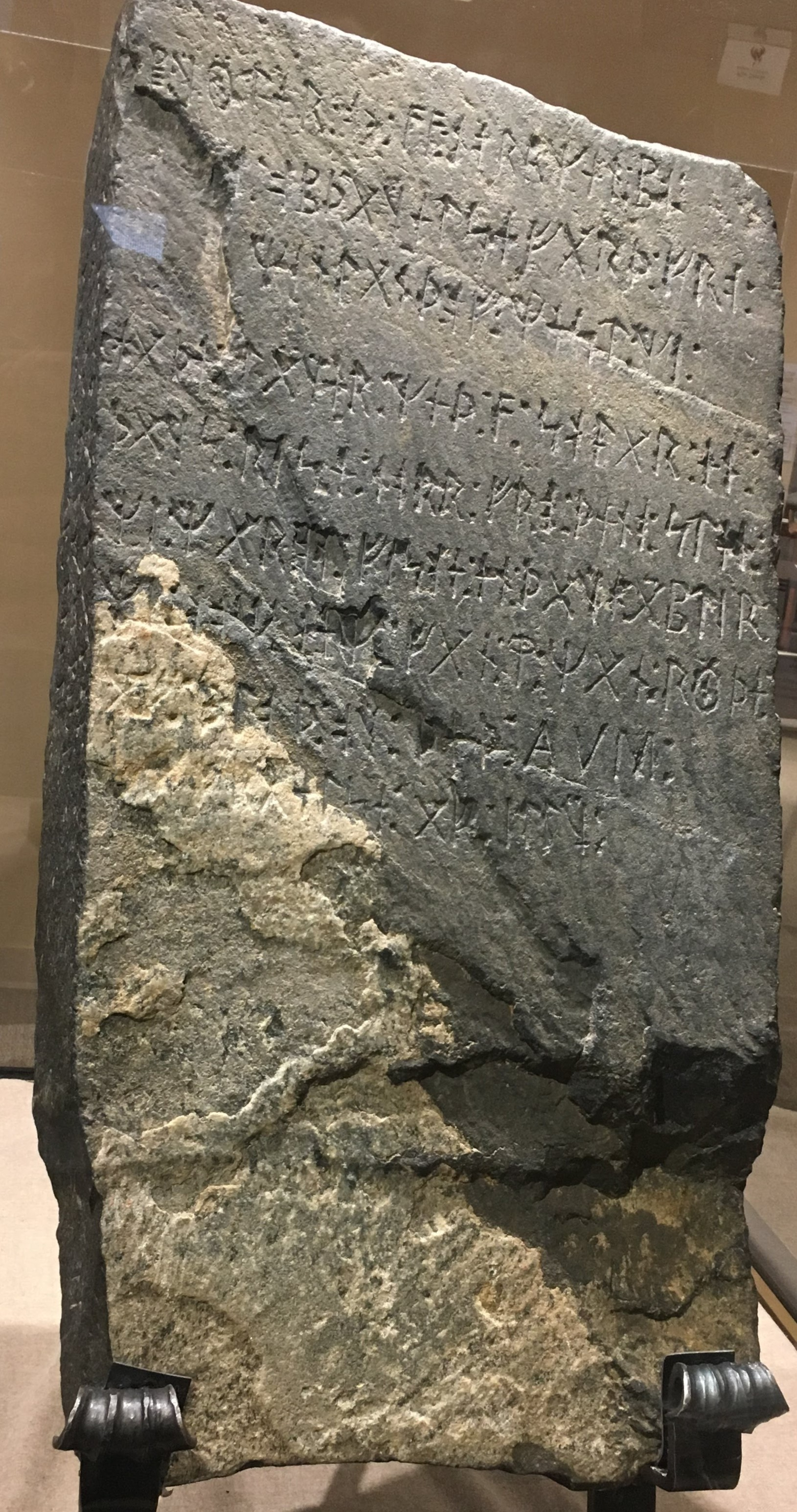
The 200-pound Kensington Runestone is on display in the Runestone Museum in Alexandria, Minnesota.

The Kensington Runestone is a greywacke tablet inscribed with runes and Latin letters. The Swedish immigrant Olof Ohman signed an affidavit stating that he had found the stone in 1898, buried in the ground, tangled in the roots of an aspen tree growing above it. Linguists dismissed the stone as a hoax after it was brought to public attention. Olaus J. Breda (1853–1916), professor of Scandinavian languages and literature in the Scandinavian Department at the University of Minnesota, found the runestone to be a forgery. Breda forwarded copies of the inscription to contemporary Scandinavian linguists and historians, such as Oluf Rygh, Sophus Bugge, Gustav Storm, Magnus Olsen and Adolf Noreen. They "unanimously pronounced the Kensington inscription a fraud and forgery of recent date". The inscription dates itself to 1362, but scholars have found many anachronisms in it, including runes that had not come into widespread use at that time and odd runic numerals. These unusual runes did match the kind of code-writing found to have been used in the 1880s by the Swedish tailor Edward Larsson. For example, both the purported runestone and Larsson used pentadic numerals, but with the place value system from Arabic numerals. Runestones verified to have been carved in the 1300s variously used written dates, Roman numerals, or the reign of a notable monarch.

Residents of the area described the stone itself as unlike those found naturally in the area. In 1899, the Norwegian newspaper Skandinaven quoted a general store owner, E. E. Aaberg: "Moreover I have never seen around here the kind of stone from which this one has been cut off." However, the slab is similar to the bluestone sold in the area by the Minnesota Stone Company, used to pave sidewalks during the 1800s, before concrete became the preferred material. Local residents reported seeing Ohman use a stone about the size and shape of the Kensington Runestone as an anvil. The back of the stone is chipped and gouged in a way consistent with these reports. Modern geological analysis indicates that runes were carved shortly before the stone's "discovery". The runes carved into the stone's calcite coating are noticeably less weathered than twentieth-century inscriptions on marble tombstones in the area. Despite its reputation as a hoax, the stone has been exhibited in museums and at the 1964 New York World's Fair.

=== Vinland Map ===
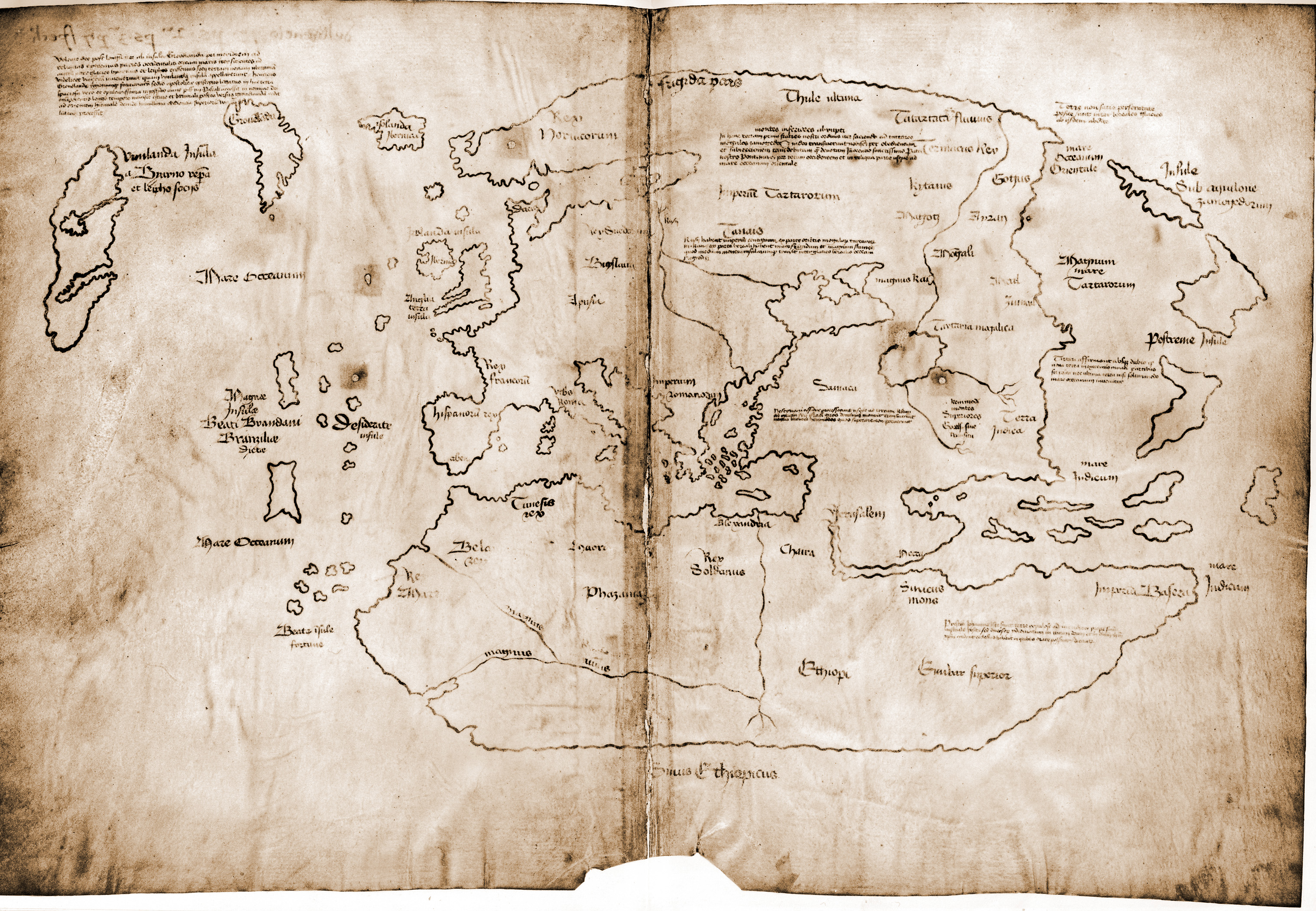
Vinland map, held at Yale's Beinecke Library since the 1960s

During the mid-1960s, Yale University announced the acquisition of a map purportedly drawn around 1440 that showed Vinland and a legend concerning Norse voyages to the region. However, certain experts doubted the authenticity of the map because of cartographic inconsistencies. For example, medieval maps often depicted Greenland vaguely as a peninsula. On the "Vinland Map", as the Icelandic researcher Gisli Sigurdsson described it, Greenland's northern coast appears "suspiciously similar to what you can see on modern maps". Chemical analysis of the map's ink later shed further doubts on its authenticity as the ink contains a titanium compound first used in 20th century ink. Scientific debate continued until 2021, when researchers found an older Latin inscription beneath the modern ink, and Yale finally acknowledged that the Vinland Map is a forgery.

== See also ==
- Pre-Columbian trans-oceanic contact theories
- Vestri Obygdir
- History of Greenland
- Gunnbjörn's skerries
- History of Nunavut
- History of Newfoundland
- Danish-Norwegian colonization of the Americas
- Leif Erikson Day
- List of North American settlements by year of foundation
- Akilineq
- Wonderstrands
- Vinland flag
- White Amazonian Indians
