= Médée Bay =

Natural bay in Newfoundland and Labrador, Canada

Coordinates: 51.600°N 55.532°W

Médée Bay is a natural bay off the island of Newfoundland in the province of Newfoundland and Labrador, Canada. It faces the modern village and archeological site of L'Anse aux Meadows.
