= L'Anse aux Meadows =

Norse archaeological site in Newfoundland, Canada

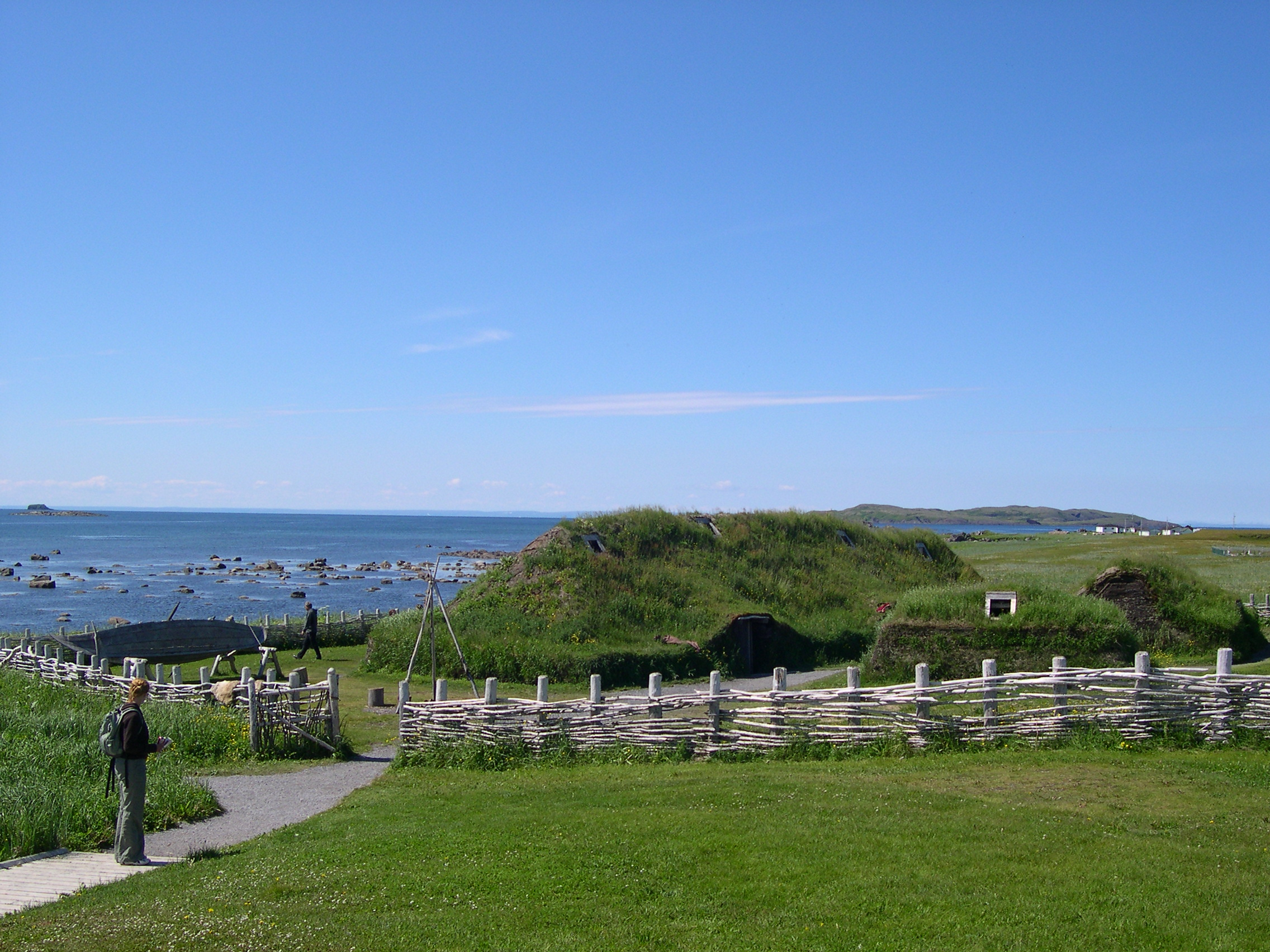
- Recreated Norse buildings at L'Anse aux Meadows

- Location of L'Anse aux Meadows in Newfoundland
- 51°35′47″N 55°32′00″W

Site notes
- Website: L'Anse aux Meadows National Historic Site

UNESCO World Heritage Site
- Official name: L'Anse aux Meadows; National Historic Site
- Type: Cultural
- Criteria: vi
- Designated: 1978 (2nd session)
- Reference no.: 4
- Country: Canada
- Region: Europe and North America

National Historic Site of Canada
- Official name: L'Anse aux Meadows National Historical Site of Canada
- Designated: 28 November 1968

L'Anse aux Meadows (Note: English: /ˌlæns oʊ ˈmɛdoʊz/ LANSS oh MED-ohz; French: [lɑ̃s o mɛdoz], locally [lãs oʊ̯ mɛˈdoʊ̯z]) is an archaeological site, first excavated in the 1960s, of a Norse settlement dating to approximately 1000 CE. The site is located near St. Anthony on the northernmost tip of the island of Newfoundland in the Canadian province of Newfoundland and Labrador.

With carbon dating estimates between 990 and 1050 CE (mean date 1014) and tree-ring dating of 1021, L'Anse aux Meadows is the only undisputed site of pre-Columbian trans-oceanic contact of Europeans with the Americas outside of Greenland. It is notable as evidence of the Norse presence in North America and for its possible connection with the accounts of Leif Erikson in the Saga of the Greenlanders and the Saga of Erik the Red, which were written down in the 13th century. Archaeological evidence suggests the settlement served as a base camp for Norse exploration of North America, including regions to the south.

Spanning 8,000 hectares (31 sq mi) of land and sea, the site contains the remains of eight buildings constructed of sod over a wood frame, with over 800 Norse objects unearthed, including bronze, bone, and stone artifacts, and evidence of iron production. The site was designated a National Historic Site of Canada in 1968 and a World Heritage Site by UNESCO in 1978, and is managed by Parks Canada.

== Etymology ==
L'Anse aux Meadows is a French-English name which can be translated as "Grassland Bay" (lit. "the bay with the grasslands"). How the village acquired this name is debated. L'Anse aux Meadows might be a corruption of the French L'Anse aux Méduses (Jellyfish Cove). A more recent conjecture derives it from L'Anse à la Médée (Medea Cove), as it is marked on an 1862 French naval chart, with Medée or Meduse possibly the name of a French naval vessel. The English name "Meadows" may have occurred as folk etymology referring to the meadowy open landscape around the cove.

== History ==
=== Indigenous occupation ===
Before the Norse arrived in Newfoundland, there is evidence of occupations by five Indigenous groups at the site of L'Anse aux Meadows, the oldest dated to roughly 6,000 years ago. None were contemporaneous with the Norse occupation. The most prominent earlier occupation was by the Dorset people, who occupied the site about 300 years before the Norse. Radiocarbon date ranges for these groups are c. 4000 – c. 1000 BCE for the Maritime Archaic tradition, c. 1000 – c. 500 BCE for the Groswater tradition, c. 400 – c. 750 for the Middle Dorset, c. 800 – c. 850 for the Cow Head Group and Beaches traditions, and c. 1200 – c. 1500 CE (after the Norse) for the Little Passage tradition.

=== Norse activity ===
The Norse settlement at L'Anse aux Meadows has been dated to approximately 1000 CE (carbon dating estimates 990–1050, with a mean carbon date of 1014), an assessment that tallies with the relative dating of artifact and structure types. A 2021 Nature study, using radiocarbon analysis of three separate tree ring samples and evidence from the anomaly in atmospheric ^{14}C concentrations in the year 993, pinpointed 1021 as a date of Norse activity at L'Anse aux Meadows.

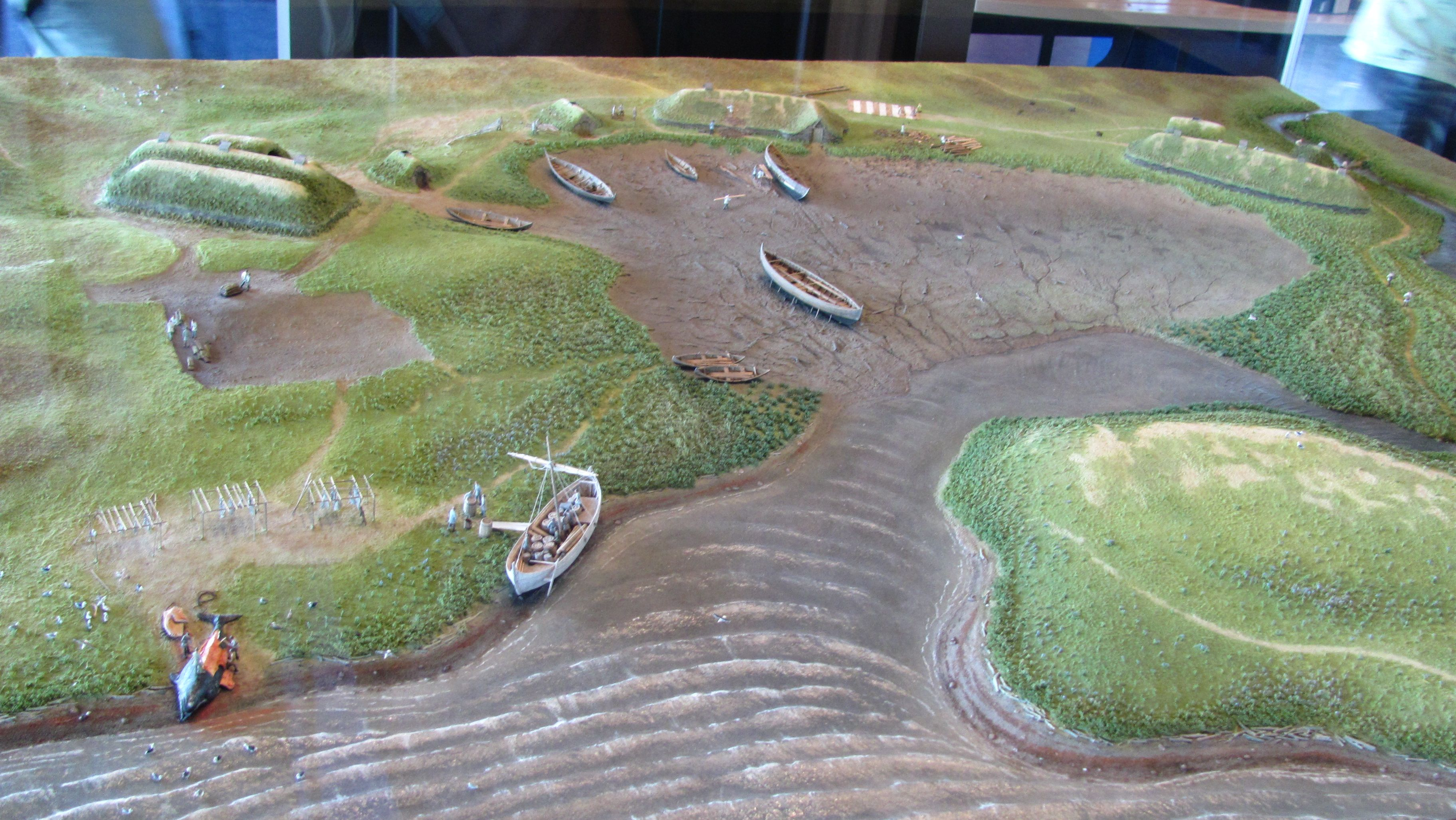
A model depicting the Norse settlement established at L'Anse aux Meadows

Anthropologist John Steinberg has suggested the site may have been "occupied at least sporadically for perhaps 20 years" by the Norse. Eleanor Barraclough suggests the site was not a permanent settlement but a temporary boat repair facility. She notes there are no findings of burials, tools, agriculture or animal pens—suggesting the inhabitants abandoned the site in an orderly fashion. According to a 2019 Proceedings of the National Academy of Sciences of the United States of America study, there may have been Norse activity in L'Anse aux Meadows for as long as a century.

There is no way to know the site's population at any given time, though the dwellings could accommodate 30 to 160 people. The entire population of Greenland at the time was about 2,500, meaning that the L'Anse aux Meadows site harbored far fewer than 10 percent of the number living at the Norse settlements on Greenland. Julian D. Richards notes: "It seems highly unlikely that the Norse had sufficient resources to construct a string of such settlements."

L'Anse aux Meadows National Historic Site map Norse-era ruins: A - Hall, B - House, C - Hut, D - Hall, E - Hut, F - Leader's hall, G - Hut, J - Iron smithy Modern features: 1 - Replica of buildings A, B, C, and J

Today, the area mostly consists of open, grassy lands, but, 1000 years ago, there were forests that were convenient for boatbuilding, housebuilding and iron extraction. The remains of eight buildings (labelled from A–J) were found. They are believed to have been constructed of sod placed over a wooden frame. Based on associated artifacts, the buildings were identified as dwellings or workshops. The largest dwelling (F) measured 28.8 m × 15.6 m (94 ft × 51 ft) and consisted of several rooms. Three small buildings (B, C, G) may have been workshops or living quarters for lower-status crew or slaves. Workshops were identified as an iron smithy (building J) containing a forge and iron slag, a carpentry workshop (building D), which generated wood debris and a specialized boat repair area containing worn rivets.

Other things found at the site consisted of common everyday Norse items, including a stone oil lamp, a whetstone, a bronze fastening pin, a bone needle for nålebinding, and part of a spindle. Stone weights, which were found in building G, may have been part of a loom. The presence of the spindle and needle suggests that women as well as men inhabited the settlement.

Food remains included butternuts, which do not grow naturally north of New Brunswick, which suggests that the Norse inhabitants travelled farther south to obtain them. There is evidence that the Norse hunted caribou, wolf, fox, bear, lynx, marten, many types of birds and fish, seal, whale and walrus. Harsh winters and ice cover force the game either to hibernate or venture south, and the lack of game must have made over-winter occupation difficult for the Norse.

=== Discovery and significance (1960–1968) ===
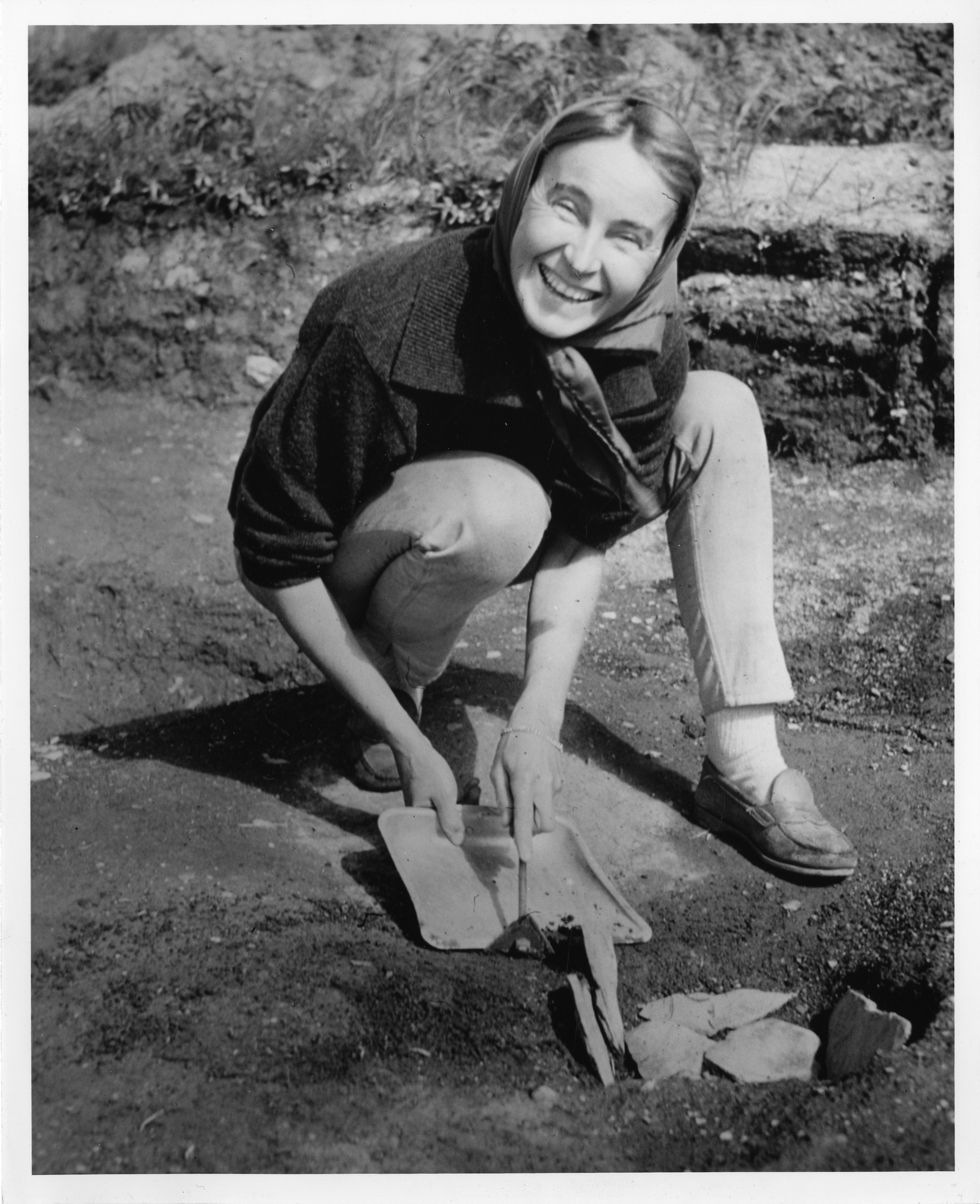
Anne Stine Ingstad at L'Anse aux Meadows, 1963. Ingstad, along with her husband, led an archaeological excavation of the site.

Archaeological remains of Norse buildings were discovered at L'Anse aux Meadows by the Norwegian husband-wife team of explorer Helge Ingstad and archaeologist Anne Stine Ingstad, who led an international team excavating during 1961–1968. Based on the idea that the Old Norse name Vinland in the Icelandic Sagas meant "wine-land", historians had long speculated that the Norse had landed in a region with wild grapes. The common hypothesis before the Ingstads was that Vinland could not be north of the Massachusetts coast, the northern limit of wild grapes, though they are also found in New Brunswick and the St. Lawrence River valley.

The Ingstads doubted this hypothesis, believing the Norse would not have felt secure settling along the American Atlantic coast. Based on an alternative pronunciation, they proposed "that the name Vinland probably means land of meadows...and includes a peninsula." (However, the later discovery of butternuts in the Norse stratum of the bog implies that the Norse did sail into the grape growing regions as well.)

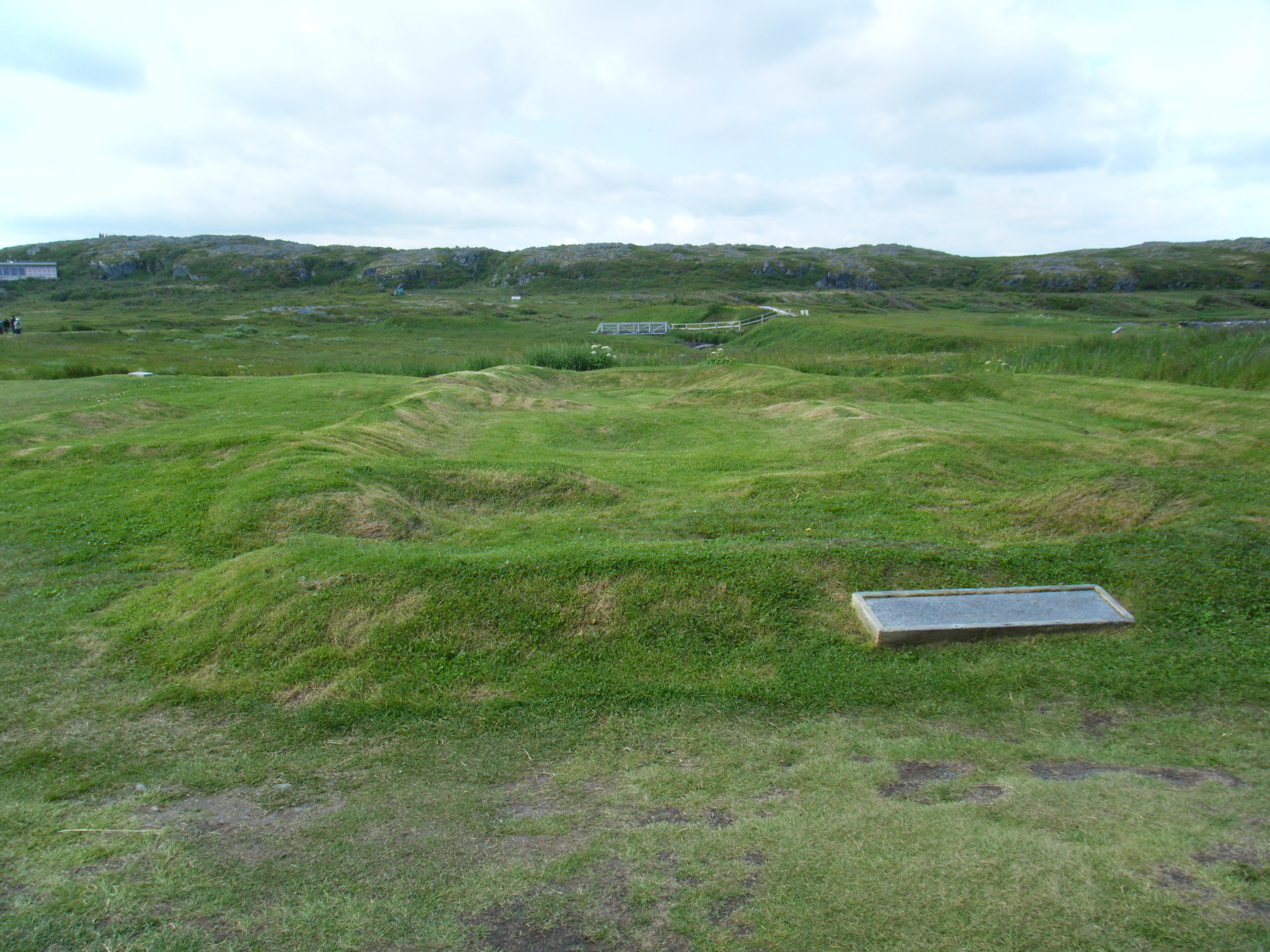
The remains of Norse buildings on display. The remains of seven Norse buildings were uncovered during the Ingstads' excavation of the site.

In 1960, George Decker, a resident of the fishing hamlet of L'Anse aux Meadows, led Helge Ingstad to a group of mounds near the village that the locals called the "old Indian camp". The grassy mounds looked like the remains of houses. Helge and Anne Ingstad carried out seven archaeological excavations there from 1961 to 1968, finding the remains of eight buildings and perhaps a ninth. They determined that the site was a Norse settlement from the characteristics of its structures and artifacts, compared to sites in Greenland and Iceland from around 1000 CE.

External videos
- "Vikings" – Historica Canada. – Heritage Minutes (1:01 min)

L'Anse aux Meadows is the only confirmed Norse site in North America outside Greenland, and represents the farthest known extent of European exploration and settlement of the New World before the voyages of Christopher Columbus almost 500 years later. Historians have speculated that there were other Norse sites in the Canadian Arctic, or at least trade contacts between Norse and Native Americans. In 2012, possible Norse outposts were identified in Nanook at Tanfield Valley on Baffin Island, as well as Nunguvik, Willows Island and the Avayalik Islands. In 2015 and 2016, Point Rosee in southwestern Newfoundland was excavated with no discoveries of a Norse presence.

=== National historic site (1968–present) ===
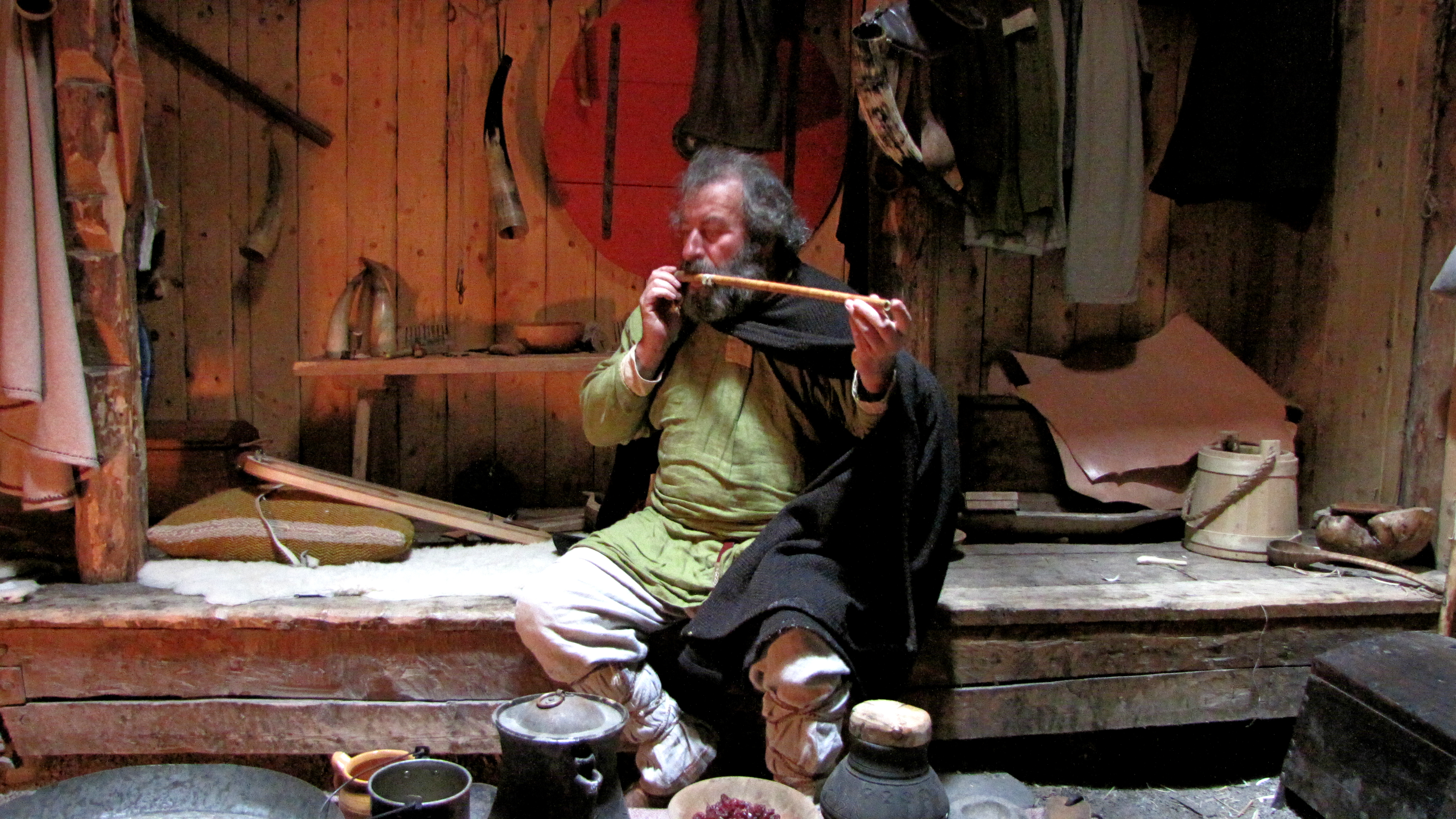
Interior of the recreated Norse sod longhouse, north of the archaeological site

In November 1968, the Government of Canada named the archaeological site a National Historic Site of Canada. The site was also named a World Heritage Site in 1978 by UNESCO. After L'Anse aux Meadows was named a national historic site, the area, and its related tourist programs, have been managed by Parks Canada. After the first excavation was completed, two more excavations of the site were ordered by Parks Canada. The excavations fell under the direction of Bengt Schonbach from 1973 to 1975 and Birgitta Wallace, in 1976. Following each period of excavation, the site was reburied to protect and conserve the cultural resources.

The remains of seven Norse buildings are on display at the national historic site. North of the Norse remains are reconstructed buildings, built in the late 20th century, as a part of an interpretive display for the national historic site. The remains of an aboriginal hunting camp are also located at the site, southwest of the Norse remains. Other amenities at the site includes picnic areas, and a visitor centre.

== Connection with literary sources ==
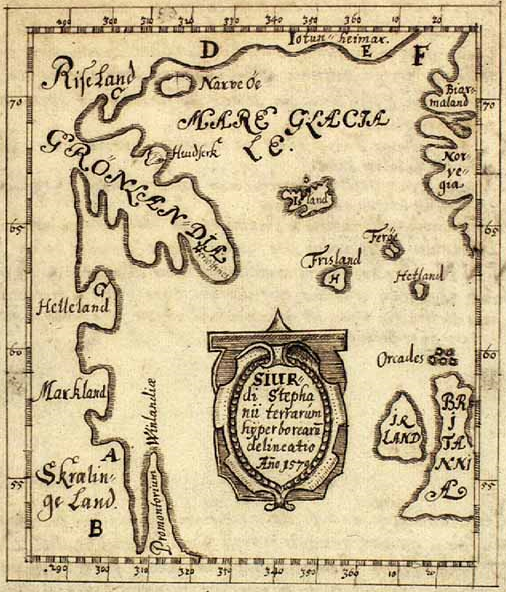
The Skálholt Map showing Latinized Norse placenames in the North Atlantic: Iotun-heimar (Jötunheimr); Riseland (Land of the Risi); Grönlandia (Greenland); Helleland (Helluland); Markland; Skrælinge Land (Land of the Skræling); Promontorium Winlandiæ (Promontory of Vinland)

In 1073, the German cleric Adam of Bremen wrote the oldest known document mentioning Vinland, a history of the archbishops of Hamburg-Bremen, who held ecclesiastical authority over Norse Scandinavia at the time. He wrote:

He [the Danish king Sven Estridsson] also told me of another island discovered by many in that ocean. It is called Vinland because vines grow there on their own accord, producing the most excellent wine. Moreover, that unsown crops abound there, we have ascertained not from fabulous conjecture but from the reliable reports of the Danes.

Two traditional Icelandic sagas, the Saga of the Greenlanders and the Saga of Erik the Red, tell of the Norse Greenlanders who discovered and attempted to settle a land to the west which they called Vinland. These sagas (together known as the Vinland sagas) recount quarrels among the Norsemen and bloody fights with the native people they called Skrælings, which led to the abandonment of the effort.

The settlements of Vinland mentioned in these two sagas, Leifsbudir (founded by Leif Erikson) and Hóp (Norse Greenlanders), have both been claimed to be the L'Anse aux Meadows site. Dr. Stuart C. Brown of Memorial University, St Johns, Newfoundland reviewed Helge Ingstad's 1988 report for "Newfoundland Quarterly, Fall, 1988. In his review Brown wrote, "...Dr. lngstad's Procrustean attempt to demonstrate that L'Anse aux Meadows is Leifsbudir is wholly unconvincing..."

== See also ==
- Former colonies and territories in Canada
- History of Newfoundland and Labrador
- List of National Historic Sites of Canada in Newfoundland and Labrador
- List of oldest buildings in Canada
- List of World Heritage Sites in Canada
- Norse colonization of North America
- St. Barbe-L'Anse aux Meadows
- Thorfinn Karlsefni
- Vinland Map
