= Vestri Obygdir =

Hypothesized 10th–13th century Viking fishing and hunting ground

Vestri Obygdir ("Western Wilderness") is a hypothesized 10th–13th century Viking fishing and hunting ground in Cumberland Sound of southeastern Baffin Island, Canada. Canadian writer Farley Mowat proposed the site in his 1973 book Westviking.

== Viking discovery and later use ==
According to Mowat's theory, Erik the Red was the first European to discover the Obygdir in 982. He led a group across the Davis Strait from Eriksfjord, his settlement in western Greenland, and spent the summer hunting whales, seals, walrus, narwhals and other sea mammals.

Mowat also proposed that many peoples used the area to fish, gather and hunt, and that the Basque fished there in the 1420s. He argues that Christopher Columbus knew about the area before his voyage to the Americas in 1492.

== See also ==
- Norse colonization of North America
- Tanfield Valley, archeological site and potential Viking settlement on Baffin Island
