= James Tuck (archaeologist) =

Canadian archaeologist

James A. Tuck, ONL FRSC (June 28, 1940 – May 10, 2019) was an American-born archaeologist whose work as a faculty member of the Memorial University of Newfoundland was focused on the early history of Newfoundland and Labrador.

== Career ==
Tuck was born in Buffalo, New York in 1940; he received a doctoral degree from Syracuse University. He subsequently began teaching and practicing archaeology as a faculty member at Memorial University of Newfoundland. Since the late 1960s, Tuck focused his archaeological work in Newfoundland and Labrador.

His early work included unearthing the Maritime Archaic burial ground at Port au Choix. From 1977 until the late 1980s he excavated the sixteenth century Basque whaling station at Red Bay Labrador.

Starting in 1969 he led teams that excavated Inuit graves on Rose Island which is now in Torngat Mountains National Park. which is viewed by the local Inuit as a desecration and robbery. This led to the remains of 113 Inuit – 100 from Rose Island and 13 from Upernavik Island being repatriated and reburied in a common grave in 1995. A further 11 Inuit remains were repatriated in a special ceremony on August 16, 2011, attended by the Honourable Kathy Dunderdale, Premier of Newfoundland and Labrador, and Nunatsiavut President Jim Lyall.

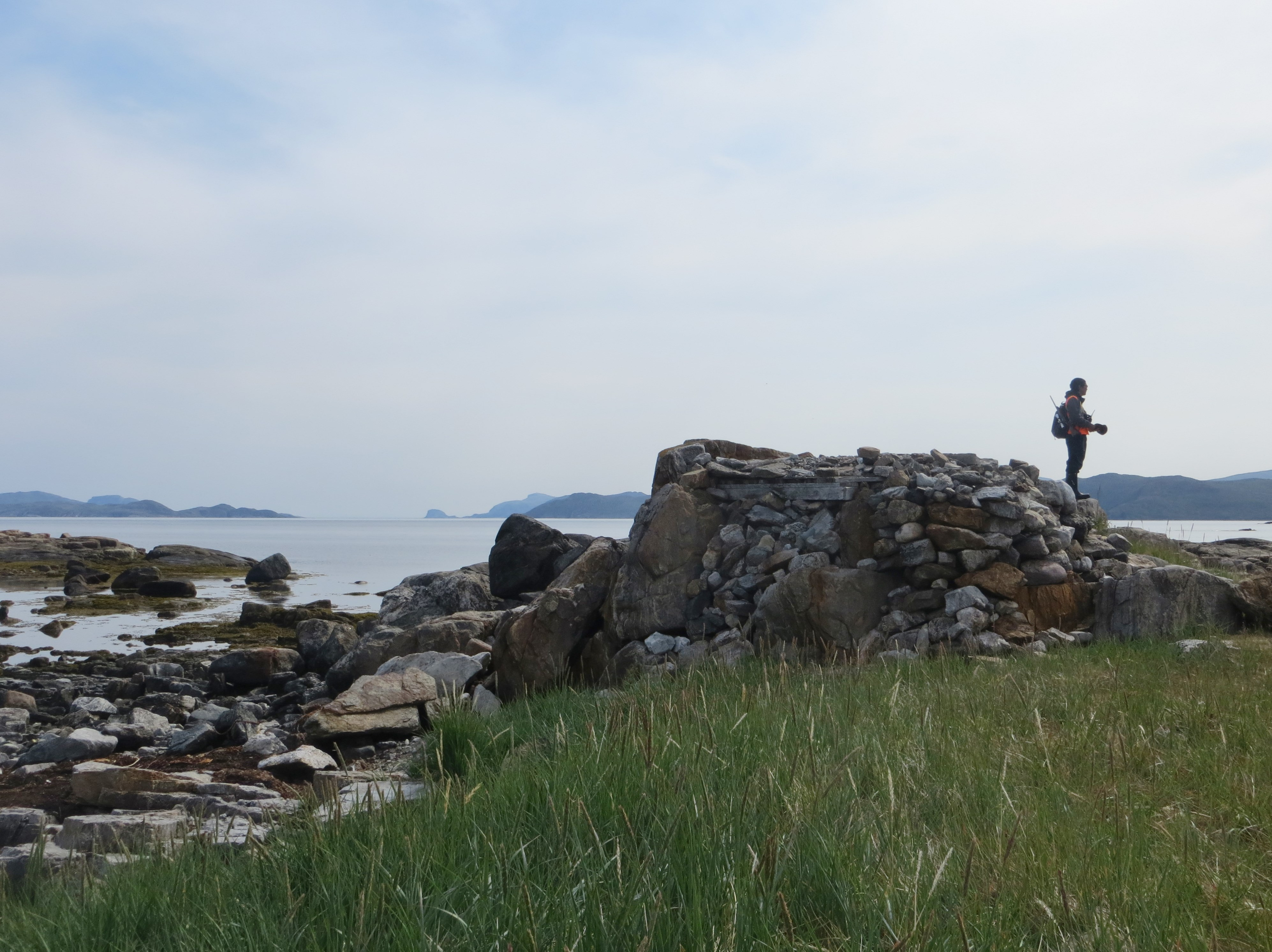
The remains of 113 Inuit are buried here.

Since the late 1980s, Tuck worked on unearthing the Province of Avalon located at Ferryland. To date the dig has found and catalogued over two million artifacts from the 4-acre (16,000 m^{2}) site.

Tuck was a supporter of Patricia Sutherland's controversial theory that there was European contact with the Dorset on Baffin Island, Canada, hundreds of years before the Norse started settling in Greenland in 985 CE. He died on May 10, 2019, at the age of 79 at Martha's Vineyard Hospital in Oak Bluffs, Massachusetts.

== Awards ==
- 1982 elected to fellowship in the Royal Society of Canada
- 2004 awarded the Order of Newfoundland and Labrador
- 2009 awarded The Smith-Wintemberg Award by the Canadian Archaeological Association
