= William Babcock =

William Babcock may refer to:

- William Babcock (politician) (1785–1838), U.S. Representative from New York
- William Perkins Babcock (1826–1899), American painter
- William Henry Babcock (1849–1922), American author and poet
- William J. Babcock (1841–1897), American soldier and Medal of Honor recipient
