= Imiligaarjuit =

Cape in the Qikiqtaaluk Region, Nunavut, Canada

- Cape
- Coordinates: 62°39′21″N 069°34′38″W
- Location: Qaqaluit Island, Nunavut
- Offshore water bodies: Davis Strait
- Topo map: NTS 25K12 Cape Wight
- Type: Cape

Imiligaarjuit (ᐃᒥᓕᒑᕐᔪᐃᑦ) formerly Cape Tanfield is a cape in the Qikiqtaaluk Region, Nunavut, Canada. It sits in Hudson Strait, about 26 km (16 mi) southeast of Kimmirut. It forms part of Baffin Island's Meta Incognita Peninsula.

The archeological site Tanfield Valley is found on the cape.
