= Dana Lepofsky =

Canadian archaeologist and ethnobiologist

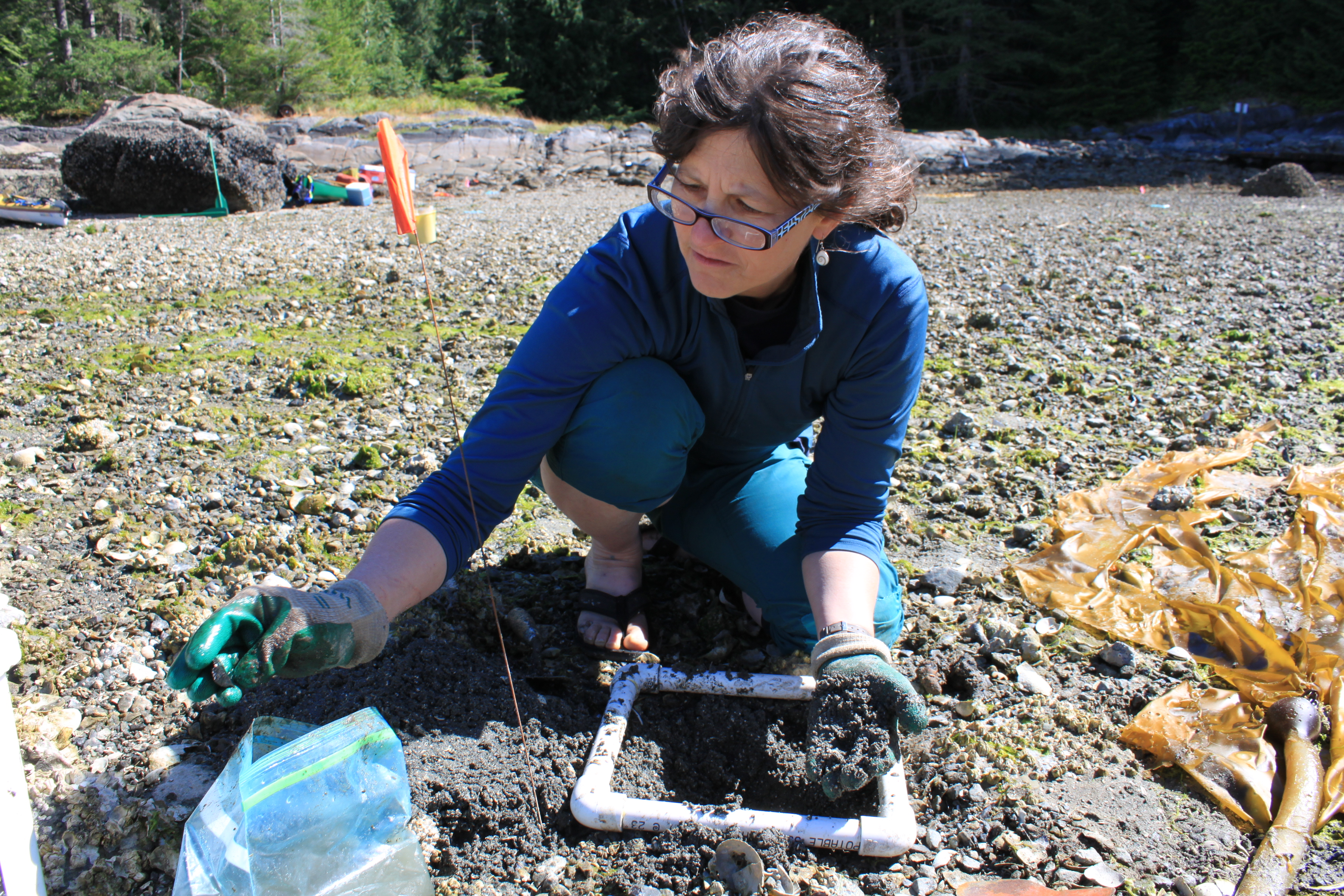
SFU archaeologist Dana Lepofsky sizes up clams found in an ancient clam garden on a Quadra Island beach.

Dana Sue Lepofsky (born 1958) is a Canadian archaeologist and ethnobiologist. She is a professor at Simon Fraser University, a former president of the Society of Ethnobiology, and received the Smith-Wintemberg Award in 2018. Her research focuses on the historical ecology of the Indigenous peoples of the Pacific Northwest Coast. She was elected a Member of the National Academy of Sciences in 2025.

== Education and career ==
Lepofsky grew up in Norwalk, CT and studied at the University of Michigan (BA), the University of British Columbia (MA, 1985) and the University of California, Berkeley (PhD, 1995). Her doctoral dissertation was on paleoethnobotany in Polynesia. She has been a professor at Simon Fraser University (SFU) since 1995.

Lepofsky's research centers on the Indigenous peoples of the Pacific Northwest Coast and how they interacted with their environment in the past. She significantly revised anthropological thinking on the historical ecology of the Northwest Coast by showing that Indigenous communities there have a long history of intensively managing coastal food resources. In particular, she has demonstrated the antiquity of herring fishing and clam gardens in the region, the latter going back at least 3,500 years. Lepofsky's research is multidisciplinary, combining archaeology, paleoethnobotany, historical ecology, and incorporating traditional knowledge from Indigenous peoples.

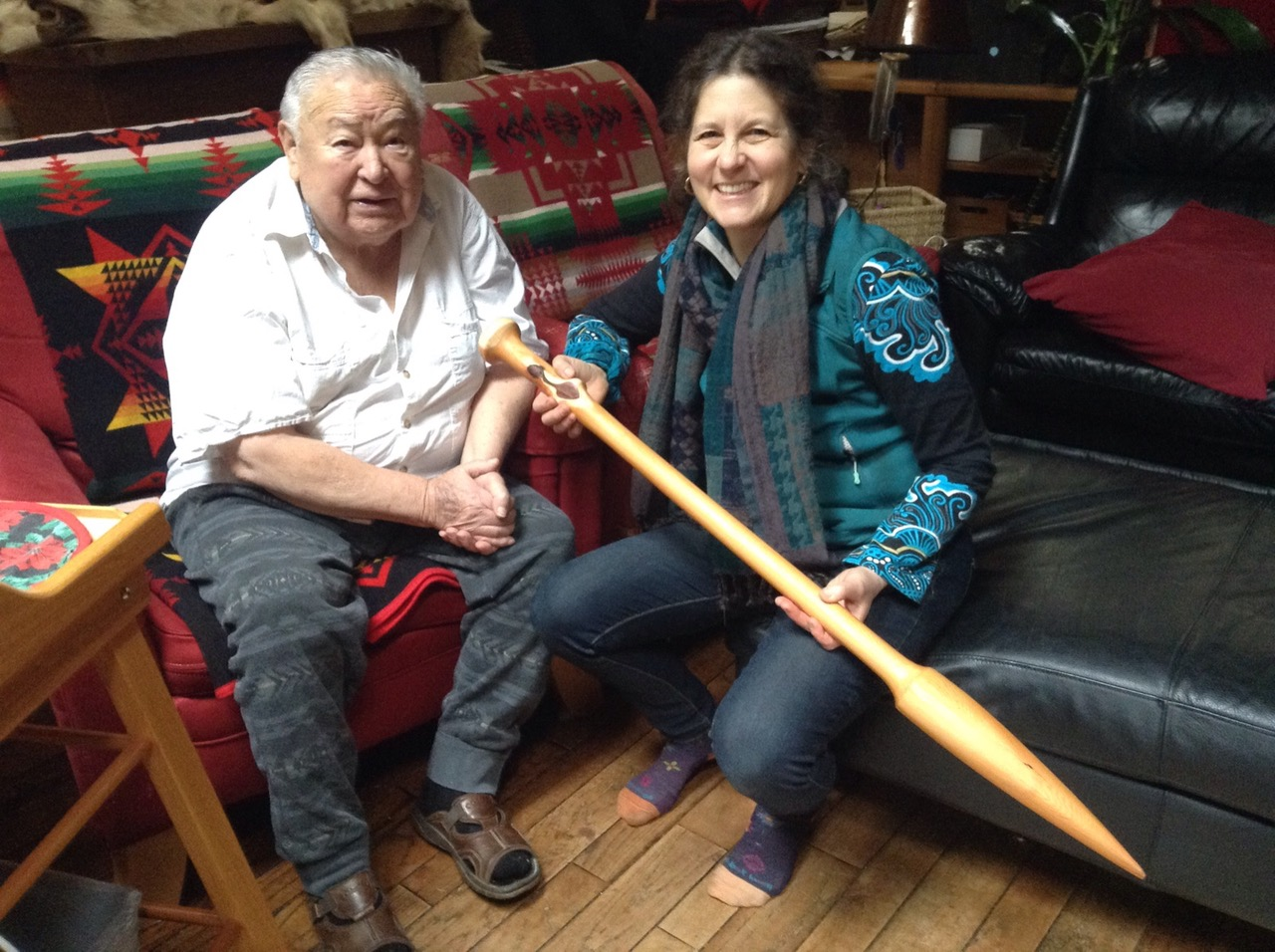
Clan Chief Kwaxsistalla Wathl'thla (Adam Dick) and SFU's Prof. Dana Lepofsky from SFU's Department of Archaeology

Her work has been noted for its engagement with Indigenous communities and in 2017 she received the Warren Gill Award for Community Impact from SFU. She has also served as the president of the Society of Ethnobiology and, in 2018, received the Smith-Wintemberg Award from the Canadian Archaeological Association. In 2022, Lepofsky received the Distinguished Ethnobiologist Award by the Society of Ethnobiology. She has been the editor-in-chief of the Journal of Ethnobiology since 2013.

== Selected publications ==
- Turner, Nancy; Lepofsky, Dana, eds. (2013). Ethnobotany in British Columbia. BC Studies, Vol. 179. Vancouver, BC: University of British Columbia.
- Quinlan, Marsha; Lepofsky, Dana, eds. (2013). Explorations in Ethnobiology: The Legacy of Amadeo Rea. Denton, TX: Society of Ethnobiology. ISBN 978-0-9887330-0-8.
- Lepofsky, Dana, Blake, M., Brown, D., Morrison, S., Oakes, N., & Lyons, N. (2000). The Archaeology of the Scowlitz site, Southwestern British Columbia. Journal of Field Archaeology, 27(4), 391–416.
- Lepofsky, D. (2004). The Northwest. In P. Minnis (Ed.), Plants and People in Ancient North America (pp. 267–364). Smithsonian Institution Press.
- Lepofsky, D., Armstrong, C. G., Mathews, D., & Greening, S. (2020). Understanding the Past for the Future: Archaeology, Plants and First Nations’ Land Use Rights. In N. J. Turner (Ed.), Plants, People, and Places: The Roles of Ethnobotany and Ethnoecology in Indigenous Peoples' Land Rights in Canada and Beyond (pp. 86–105). McGill-Queen's University Press.
