= Robert McGhee (archaeologist) =

Canadian archaeologist

Robert John McGhee (born 1941) is a Canadian archaeologist and author, specializing in the archaeology of the Arctic.

McGhee was born in Wiarton, Ontario, in 1941. He studied at the University of Toronto and the University of Calgary, receiving a Ph.D. in 1968. McGhee worked in the Middle East as a student. He went on to study the remains of Martin Frobisher's expedition searching for the Northwest Passage, a 2000-year-old village in the Siberian peninsula and an Inuit village at Resolute, Nunavut. He was Curator of Western Arctic Archaeology at the Canadian Museum of Civilization, now the Canadian Museum of History, until he retired in 2008. He was then named emeritus curator, but lost this status in 2012 when his wife, Patricia Sutherland, was let go by the museum.

He was awarded the Massey Medal of the Royal Canadian Geographical Society in 2000. McGhee is a former president of the Canadian Archaeological Association and a Fellow of the Royal Society of Canada.

== Selected bibliography ==
- The Last Imaginary Place: A Human History Of The Arctic World (2005) ISBN 0-19-518368-1
- The Arctic Voyages Of Martin Frobisher: An Elizabethan Adventure (2001) ISBN 0-7735-2235-2
- Ancient People of the Arctic (1996) ISBN 0-7748-0553-6
