= Canadian Archaeological Association =

Canadian learned society

- Formation: 1968
- Website: canadianarchaeology.com

The Canadian Archeological Association (CAA; French: Association canadienne d'archéologie) is the primary archaeological organization in Canada. The CAA was founded in 1968 by a group of archaeologists that included William E. Taylor, the head of the Archaeology Division at the National Museum of Canada. The organization's first publication was named the Bulletin. In 1977 it was renamed the Canadian Journal of Archaeology.

== Smith-Wintemberg Award ==
The Smith-Wintemberg Award (also known as the Smith-Wintemberg Medal) was established by the CAA in 1978. It recognises outstanding lifetime contributions to Canadian archaeology and is named for the pioneering archaeologists Harlan I. Smith and William J. Wintemberg. The nomination process is rigorous, requiring at least two letters of recommendation from peers, and as such the award is not given every year, only on merit. The Smith-Wintemberg Award is considered highly prestigious and has been described as the "highest recognition in Canadian archaeology".

The recipients of the award as of March 2019 are:

- Claude Chapdelaine (2019)
- Dana Lepofsky (2018)
- Thomas Andrews (2018)
- Christopher J. Ellis (2017)
- Ron Williamson (2016)
- Birgitta Wallace (2015)
- Michael Spence (2014)
- Alan D. McMillan (2013)
- Knut R. Fladmark (2013)
- Peter Ramsden (2012)
- Marcel Moussette (2012)
- Stephen A. Davis (2011)
- William J. Byrne (2010)
- Robert McGhee (2009)
- James Tuck (2009)
- Richard E. Morlan (2008)
- Bruce G. Trigger (2007)
- R.G. Matson (2005)
- E. Leigh Syms (2004)
- Norman Clermont (2002)
- B.O.K. Reeves (2001)
- James F. Pendergast (2000)
- Donald H. Mitchell (1998)
- Roy L. Carlson (1995)
- James V. Wright (1992)
- William E. Taylor Jr. (1992)
- Richard G. Forbis (1984)
- Charles E. Borden (1978)
- J. Norman Emerson (1978)

== Leadership ==
- 1968 – James Wright
- 1969 – George MacDonald
- 1970 – Charles Borden
- 1971 – Richard Forbis
- 1972, 1973 – James Tuck
- 1974, 1975 – Roscoe Wilmeth
- 1976, 1977 – Norman Emerson
- 1978, 1979 – Richard Morlan
- 1980, 1981 – William Byrne
- 1982, 1983 – Leigh Syms
- 1984, 1985 – Robert Janes
- 1986 – Knut Fladmark
- 1987, 1988 – Robert McGhee
- 1989, 1990 – David Burley
- 1991, 1992 – David Meyer
- 1993 – Jane Kelley
- 1994, 1995 – David Pokotylo
- 1996, 1997 – Bev Nicholson
- 1998, 1999 – Mima Kapches
- 2000, 2001, 2002 – Gerry Oetelaar
- 2003 – Dean Knight
- 2004, 2005 – Gary Coupland
- 2006, 2007 – Margaret Hanna
- 2008, 2009 – Jack Brink
- 2010, 2011 – Eldon Yellowhorn
- 2012, 2013 – Bill Ross
- 2014, 2015 – Lisa Rankin
- 2016, 2017 – Gary Warrick
- 2018, 2019 – Michael Deal
- 2020, 2021 – Lisa Hodgetts
- 2022, 2023 – Helen Kristmanson
- 2024, 2025 – Katie Cottreau-Robins

== See also ==
- List of archaeology awards
