= Roscoe Wilmeth =

American archaeologist

- Born: April 17, 1922; St. Marys, Pennsylvania, United States
- Died: August 19, 1981 (aged 59); Anahim Lake, British Columbia, Canada
- Occupation: Archaeologist

Roscoe Hall Wilmeth (April 17, 1922 – August 19, 1981) was an American archaeologist who was born in St. Marys, Pennsylvania. His research was focused on the protohistoric and historic period cultures in the Southwest and Great Plains regions of the United States, and the province of British Columbia in Canada. Wilmeth's major areas of expertise included Pueblo, Navajo, Kansa, Pawnee, Athabaskan and Chilcotin cultures. Wilmeth played a major role in the creation of the state archaeologist position in Kansas, was the first to occupy this position, and later went on to become a major contributor to Canadian archaeology as an archaeologist for the Canadian Museum of Civilization, formerly known as the National Museum of Man and which includes the Archaeological Survey of Canada.

== Education ==
Wilmeth grew up in the outskirts of Springfield, Illinois. As a teenager, he volunteered at the Illinois State Museum. Prior to World War II he entered the University of Chicago to study Zoology. Wilmeth left the University of Chicago before completing his bachelor's degree because he was drafted into the United States Army during World War II, during which he was stationed in Los Alamos, New Mexico. After his discharge in 1946, Wilmeth returned to the University of Chicago with the intention to focus on anthropology, an interest that came from his encounters with the Pueblo culture while he was in New Mexico. However, he was not accepted into the anthropology program at the University of Chicago and he so returned to New Mexico.

In 1949, he entered the University of New Mexico to pursue a degree in anthropology. He completed his bachelor's degree in 1951 and stayed on to complete his master's degree which he finished in 1956 under the guidance of Florence Hawley Ellis, Stanley Newman and W. W. Hill. His thesis, titled Cuyumungue, focused on Cuyumungue Pueblo in the vicinity of Santa Fe, New Mexico. Wilmeth worked as a professional archaeologist in Kansas until late 1960, when he moved to Ann Arbor, Michigan, to work on a Ph.D. dissertation at the University of Michigan.

In 1972, Wilmeth completed his Doctorate in anthropology under the guidance of James Bennett Griffin at the University of Michigan with a dissertation titled, The Woodland Sequence in the Central Plains, which focused on cultures of the Woodland period.

== Career ==
Wilmeth's career as an archaeologist developed in his graduate years at the University of New Mexico. He worked for the Navajo Inter-Tribal Council documenting sites for land claim cases against the United States Federal government. After he completed his master's degree in 1956, he took a temporary position at the University of South Dakota where he worked as a curator, lecturer and archaeologist. He directed archaeological investigations at the Payne Site in 1956 and published two works on these investigations.

=== Research in Kansas ===
In 1956, the position with the University of South Dakota was being terminated and Wilmeth began looking for a new job. One of the places he inquired about a position with was the University of Kansas Natural History Museum. His interest in a curator position was communicated to the Kansas Historical Society, which had an opening for a curator position. Wilmeth was offered the job and took it. He became very interested in the archaeology of Kansas and from 1957 to 1960 conducted surveys and identified numerous sites. He led excavations of two sites at the Pomona Reservoir in Osage County, Kansas, and wrote up an appraisal of the archaeological resources at both Pomona and Melvern Lake reservoirs in 1958. He went to the location of 14RP1, the remains of a Pawnee village, in hopes of recovering some artifacts for exhibits at the Kansas Museum of History. Wilmeth kept field journals of all the archaeology he executed along with index cards containing site information. This became the first form of an archaeological site inventory at the Kansas Historical Society.

Wilmeth was also very interested in trying to locate Kansa (also known as Kaw) villages. He researched this heavily and published an assessment on the status of Kansa archaeology in 1959. During his investigations into the Kansa (and throughout much of his career), Wilmeth corresponded with archaeologist Waldo Wedel, who was a constant source of encouragement. In 1960, Wilmeth became the first State Archaeologist for the State of Kansas at the Kansas Historical Society, a position that he helped to create and upon which he had great influence.

=== National Museum of Man, Ottawa, Canada ===
In 1965, he took a position with the National Museum of Man in Ottawa, Ontario, Canada, where he was employed until his death in 1981. Wilmeth undertook research into the Athabaskan and Chilcotin (also spelled Tsilhqot'in) cultures, with which he saw connections with his earlier research in the Southwest and Great Plains. He had hoped to publish research into these connections one day. Throughout the later half of the 1960s and 1970s, Wilmeth researched and published work on radiocarbon dates in Canada, Canadian prehistory, and the Chilcotin of the Anahim Lake area of British Columbia. He released several publications on geological surveys of radiocarbon dates, but did not completely rely on the science and even questioned the reliability of radiocarbon dates. Wilmeth applied the direct historical approach to his work, which he learned directly form innovators such as Waldo Wedel and the Chilcotin became his primary area of research during his career at the National Museum of Man. Wilmeth also continued to publish material from his earlier work in Kansas. He held the titles of Prairie Archaeologist, Head of the Western Canada Section, Head of the Salvage Section, and Plateau Archaeologist during his tenure at the National Museum of Man.

Wilmeth was elected president of the Canadian Archaeological Association and served from 1974 to 1975.

Wilmeth died on August 19, 1981, near Anahim Lake, British Columbia.

== Impact on archaeology ==
Wilmeth's archaeological accomplishments at the Kansas Historical Society created the position state archaeologist, one that had not existed before. He pushed the argument that there were enough archaeological resources and collections, especially when combined with the newly forming highway salvage archaeology program, to require a formal position to manage archaeological resources and activities. This position was created at the Kansas Historical Society in 1960, with Wilmeth as the first State archaeologist.

Today, the archaeology program at the Kansas Historical Society has grown into staff of several archaeologists and assistants directed by the state archaeologist. The archaeology program still operates the highway archaeology program and Federal NRCS projects according to section 106 of the National Historic Preservation Act of 1966.

During the 16 years that Wilmeth was at the National Museum of Man, he directed a vast amount of archaeology there. His contributions to the use of radiocarbon dating and investigations into the prehistory of Athabaskan and related Chilcotin cultures has benefited Canadian and North American archaeological data. His nomination to presidency of the Canadian Archaeological Association for 2 years exemplified his authoritative status in the realm of Canadian archaeology.

== Publications ==
- 1956 Cuyamungue Pueblo. Thesis (MA)—Albuquerque: University of New Mexico.
- 1958 Appraisal of the Archaeological Resources of the Pomona and Melvern Reservoirs, Osage County, Kansas. Submitted to the US National Park Service.
- 1958 Report of the Investigations of the Payne Site, 39WW302, Walworth County, South Dakota. South Dakota Archaeological Commission, Archaeological Studies, Circular No. 8. Pierre.
- 1959 Present Status of the Archaeology of the Kansa Indians. Kansas Anthropological Association, 7(4): 53–56.
- 1960 Kansa Village Locations in the Light of McCoy's 1828 Journal. Kansas Historical Quarterly, Vol. 27, No. 2.
- 1969 Canadian Archaeological Radiocarbon Dates. National Museum of Canada, Bulletin 232, Paper No. 3. Ottawa.
- 1969 Canada Before Cartier; A Prehistoric Outline. National Museum of Man, Ottawa.
- 1970 Chilcotin Archaeology. Canadian Archaeological Association, Bull. 2. Ottawa.
- 1970 Excavations at Anahim Lake, B.C. Newsletter of the Archaeological Society of B.C., Vol. 2, No. 2, Vancouver.
- 1970 Excavations in the Pomona Reservoir. Kansas State Historical Society Anthropological Series, No. 5. Topeka.
- 1971 Historic Chilcotin Archaeology at Anahim Lake, British Columbia. "Aboriginal Man and Environments on the Plateau of Northwest America." University of Calgary Archaeological Association.
- 1972 Radiocarbon Dating: Friend or Foe? Arch Notes, 72(4). Ontario Archaeological Society, Inc. Toronto.
- 1972 The Woodland Sequence in the Central Plains. Unpublished PhD dissertation, University of Michigan, Ann Arbor.
- 1975 The Protohistoric and Historic Athabaskan Occupation of British Columbia: The Archaeological Evidence. Western Canadian Journal of Anthropology, Vol. 5, No. 3-4. 4-20.
- 1977 Chilcotin Archaeology: The Direct Historic Approach. "Problems in the Prehistory of the North American Subarctic: The Athabaskan Question." Proceeding the 9th annual conference of the archaeological association of the University of Calgary.
- 1978 Canadian Archaeological Radiocarbon Dates (Revised Version). National Museum of Man, Mercury Series, Archaeological Survey of Canada, Paper No. 77.
- 1979 Anahim Lake Archaeology and the Early Historic Chilcotin Indians. National Museum of Man, Mercury Series, Archaeological Survey of Canada, Paper No. 82.
- 1979 An Athabaskan Hypothesis. Canadian Journal of Archaeology, No. 3. 33–40.
