= Birgitta Wallace =

Swedish–Canadian archaeologist (1934–2025)

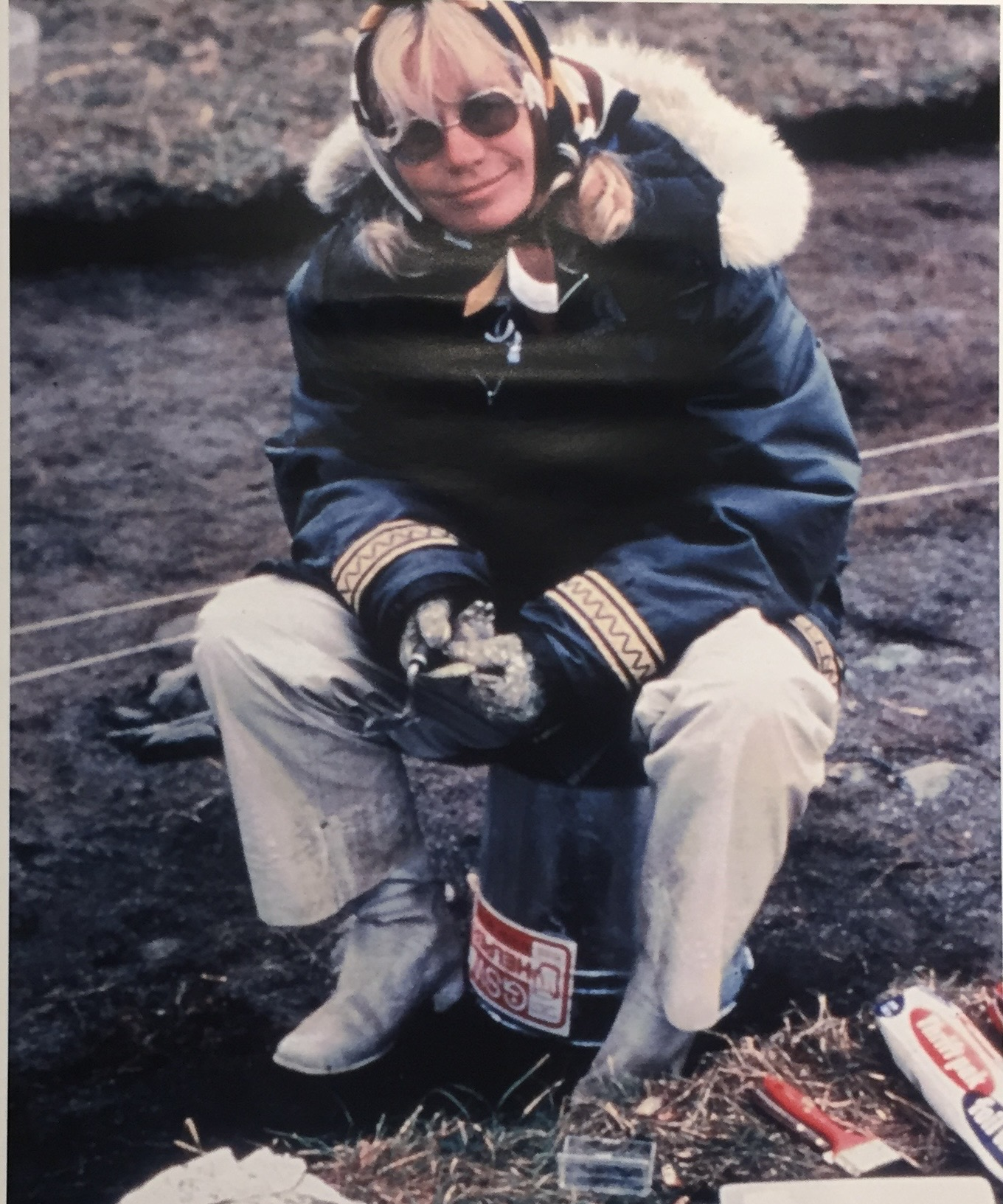
Wallace in 1976

Birgitta Linderoth Wallace (1 May 1934 – 20 May 2025) was a Swedish–Canadian archaeologist specialising in Norse archaeology in North America. She spent most of her career as an archaeologist with Parks Canada and is best known for her work on L'Anse aux Meadows, currently the only widely accepted Norse site in North America.

Wallace received a Smith-Wintemberg Award from the Canadian Archaeological Association in 2015.

== Life and career ==
Wallace was born in Stockholm on 1 May 1934, to Swedish and Danish parents. She studied at Uppsala University and trained on archaeological sites in Sweden and Norway. After receiving her master's degree, she spent some time as a curator at the Carnegie Museum of Natural History in Pittsburgh, Pennsylvania. In 1975, she moved to Canada to take a position as an archaeologist with Parks Canada, where she remained until her retirement.

The focus of Wallace's career was Norse archaeology in North America, which she began working on at the Carnegie Museum. However, she had also worked on Native American, Aboriginal Canadian, and early French Canadian sites in North America, as well as in Scandinavia and Israel.

Wallace died in Halifax on 20 May 2025, at the age of 91.

== Selected publications ==
- Wallace, Birgitta Linderoth (2006). Westward Vikings: the saga of L'Anse aux Meadows. St. John's, NL: Historic Sites Association of Newfoundland and Labrador. ISBN 9780919735095. OCLC 860834252.
- — (2003). "The Norse in Newfoundland: L'Anse aux Meadows and Vinland". Newfoundland and Labrador Studies. 19 (1): 5–43.
- — (2003). "L'Anse aux Meadows and Vinland: An Abandoned Experiment". In Barrett, James H. (ed.). Contact, Continuity, and Collapse: The Norse Colonization of the North Atlantic. Studies in the Early Middle Ages. Vol. 5. Turnhout: Brepols. pp. 207–238. doi:10.1484/M.SEM-EB.3.3837. ISBN 978-2-503-52641-6.
- — (2000). "The Viking settlement at L'Anse aux Meadows". In Fitzhugh, William W.; Ward, Elisabeth I. (eds.). Vikings: the North Atlantic saga. Washington D.C.: Smithsonian Institution Press. ISBN 9781560989707. OCLC 42921299.
- — (1991). "L'Anse aux Meadows: gateway to Vinland". In Bigelow, Gerald F. (ed.). The Norse of the North Atlantic. Acta Archaeologica vol. 61. Copenhagen: Munksgaard. pp. 166–198. OCLC 31367739.
