= Eleanor Barraclough =

British cultural historian and writer

Eleanor Barraclough FSA FRHistS FRSA

Academic background
- Education: Churchill College, Cambridge Pembroke College, Cambridge (MA, MPhil, PhD)

Academic work
- Discipline: Medieval history
- Institutions: Bath Spa University; Durham University; Oxford University; Cambridge University

Eleanor Barraclough is a British historian, broadcaster and writer.

Her work explores the cultures, literatures and languages of the medieval north, particularly Viking Age history, Old Norse-Icelandic literature and mythology, and the British Isles in the first millennium CE. Her most recent book, Embers of the Hands: Hidden Histories of the Viking Age (Profile, 2024) was shortlisted for the Wolfson History Prize, longlisted for the Women’s Prize for Non-Fiction, and chosen as a Times History Book of the Year.

== Academia ==
Eleanor Barraclough studied at the University of Cambridge, in the Department of Anglo-Saxon, Norse and Celtic, where she completed an MA (Cantab), an MPhil, and a PhD. She then moved to the University of Oxford, where she was a Leverhulme Early Career Fellow in the Faculty of English, and an Extraordinary Junior Research Fellow at The Queen's College. From there she moved to Durham University, where she was associate professor in Medieval History and Literature. She is currently Reader in Public History at Bath Bath Spa University. She held an AHRC Leadership Grant from 2020 to 2024, for a multidisciplinary study of forests in early northern Germanic cultures.

== Broadcasting ==
In 2013, Barraclough was chosen as one of ten BBC / AHRC New Generation Thinkers, in a competition to develop a new generation of academics who can bring the best of university research and scholarly ideas to a broad audience through the media and public engagement.

Since then, she has worked extensively for the BBC, including presenting Beyond the Walls: In Search of the Celts for BBC4, Free Thinking for Radio 3, Time Travellers for Radio 3’s Essential Classics and many documentaries for Radio 3 and Radio 4, for series including Costing the Earth, Sunday Feature, Illuminated, Open Country and On Your Farm. Eleanor appeared as a guest on Radio 3's Private Passions where she discussed her musical training at the Royal College of Music's Junior Department.

== Writing ==
Embers of the Hands: Hidden Histories of the Viking Age (Profile, 2024) was shortlisted for the Wolfson History Prize, longlisted for the Women’s Prize for Non-Fiction, and chosen as a Times History Book of the Year. It has been translated into many languages, including Norwegian and Spanish.

Beyond the Northlands: Viking Voyages and the Old Norse Sagas (Oxford University Press, 2016) was chosen as one of Dominic Sandbrook’s Top Twenty History Books of All Time for the Daily Mail and a Book of the Year by the Times Literary Supplement.

Eleanor has written for many publications, including The Guardian, The Telegraph, The Independent, The Times Literary Supplement, BBC History Magazine and BBC Countryfile Magazine.

In 2020, she was a judge for the Costa Book Award for Biography. In 2019 and 2020, she was a judge for the BBC Countryfile Magazine Awards.

== Works ==
- —; Cudmore, Danielle Marie; Donecker, Stefan, eds. (October 2016). Imagining the Supernatural North. University of Alberta Press. p. 328. ISBN 978-1-77212-267-1.
- — (December 2016). Beyond the Northlands: Viking Voyages and the Old Norse Sagas. Oxford University Press. p. 320. ISBN 978-0198701248.
- Barraclough, Eleanor (September 2024). Embers of the Hands: Hidden Histories of the Viking Age. Profile Books. ISBN 978-1-78816-674-4.
