= William Henry Babcock =

American author and poet (1849–1922)

William Henry Babcock (1849–1922) was an American author and poet. He was born in 1849 in St. Louis, the son of Jonathan Wells Babcok and Catharine Babcock (born Smith). In 1874 he married Ann Johns Earle, having at least 5 sons and 6 daughters. In 1897, he married Gertrude Lee Mahood.

He died Washington, DC, in 1922.

Babcock graduated from the Columbian University Law School, worked as a journalist, and practiced law in Washington D.C., specializing in patent law after having spent a year in the United States Patent Office as a patent examiner.

Aside from several collections of poetry, he wrote historical novels and works.

== Works ==
- The Two Lost Centuries of Britain (Philadelphia: J.B. Lippincott Co., 1890)
- Cypress Beach (Washington: W.H. Babcock, 1890)
- Cian of the Chariots (Boston: Lothrop Publishing Company, 1898)
- The Tower of Wye: A Romance (Philadelphia: H. T. Coates & Co., 1901)
- Kent Fort Manor: A Novel (Philadelphia: Henry T. Coates, 1903)
- Early Norse Visits to North America
- Legendary Islands of the Atlantic: A Study in Medieval Geography, New York: American Geographical Society, 1922

Poetry

- Lord Stirling's Stand, and Other Poems (Philadelphia: J.B. Lippincott & Co., 1880)
- Lays from Over the Sea (London: W. Stewart & Co., 1882)
- Legends of the New World (Boston: R. G. Badger, 1919)
