= Patricia Sutherland =

Canadian archaeologist

Patricia D. Sutherland is a Canadian archaeologist, specialising in the Arctic. She is an adjunct professor at Carleton University, an Honorary Research Fellow at the University of Aberdeen, and sole proprietor of Northlands Research. Much of her recent research has focused on evidence of a lengthy Norse presence on Baffin Island in the 11th to 13th centuries CE and trade between them and the now-extinct Dorset people of the region. Sutherland's theory that there were Europeans on Baffin Island hundreds of years before the Norse settled Greenland at the start of the 11th century is controversial.

== Education and career ==
Sutherland holds a PhD from the University of Alberta. She is an Adjunct Research Professor at Carleton University in Ottawa. and an Honorary Research Fellow at the University of Aberdeen

Until April 2012, she was also employed at the Canadian Museum of Civilization, now the Canadian Museum of History, most recently as curator of Arctic archaeology. She was the only female archaeologist working there. It has been speculated, including by the CBC programme The Fifth Estate, that she was let go because her research no longer fit with the changed focus of the museum on Canadian history, and some have suggested that the political motivation extends to a fear that her research will undermine Canadian sovereignty claims in the high Arctic. Other speculation points to her having been one of six staff of the museum who wrote a letter objecting on moral grounds to its acquisition of a collection of artefacts taken from the wreck of RMS Empress of Ireland. When Sutherland was fired, her access to her research materials was cut off and many were dispersed. There have been calls by fellow archaeologists and a petition for her to be allowed to resume her research.

== Research ==
Sutherland is an expert in Canadian indigenous archaeology. In 1977, surveying what was to become Quttinirpaaq National Park, on Ellesmere Island, for Parks Canada, she found a piece of bronze that turned out to be half of a Norse silver weighing balance. In 1979, on Axel Heiberg Island, she found a piece of antler on which two different faces were carved: one with round-faced Dorset features, the other thin-faced and with heavy eyebrows. In 1999, she discovered among finds from a Dorset site near Pond Inlet, on northern Baffin Island, a piece of spun yarn or cordage that did not conform with the twine made of animal sinews used by the Inuit but did correspond to that used in the 14th century in Norse settlements in Greenland; however, it was spun from hair of the Arctic hare. This and evidence of metalworking–bronze and smelted iron, in addition to whetstones used for sharpening metal implements–and tally sticks like those used by the Norse, found at four sites where Dorset people had camped as much as 1,000 miles (1,600 km) apart between northern Baffin Island and northern Labrador, suggested both long-term trading contact between the Norse and the Dorset, and a long-term presence of Norsemen in the region. She presented her view at an exhibition titled Full Circle: First Contact, Vikings and Skraelings in Newfoundland and Labrador, which opened at the Provincial Museum of Newfoundland and Labrador in summer 2000, and at a meeting of the Council for Northeast Historical Archaeology in St. John's in October 2012. Further excavating the Nanook site at Tanfield Valley on southern Baffin Island, she has found fur from Old World rats, a whalebone shovel like those used in Viking Greenland to cut turf, evidence of European-style masonry, more whetstones and tally sticks, and a Dorset-style carved mask that depicts a face with apparently European features; she believes this was the location of a Norse trading site established around 1300. She has continued to find evidence of Norse metalworking elsewhere in the region. The radiocarbon dates of items at the Nanook site include some predating the Norse by several hundred years. Sutherland suggests this is possible evidence of earlier contact with Europeans. Sutherland argues that the site was occupied by different peoples over centuries.

Sutherland's theory that the spun yarn or cordage of Arctic hare fur is evidence of possible European contact with the Dorset is controversial. Elizabeth Wayland Barber of Occidental College, archaeologist and expert on textiles, writing about the Lascaux caves in France, "We now have at least two pieces of evidence that this important principle of twisting for strength dates to the Palaeolithic. Michele Hayeur Smith of Brown University, "The idea that you would have to learn to spin something from another culture was a bit ludicrous," she said. "It's a pretty intuitive thing to do." William W. Fitzhugh, director of the Arctic Studies Center at the Smithsonian Institution in Washington, and a senior scientist at the National Museum of Natural History, says that there is insufficient published evidence to support Sutherland's claims, and that the Dorset themselves were using spun cordage by the 6th century. One of the pieces of 2-ply spun Arctic hare fur cordage, item KdDq-9-3:4797, returned an accelerator mass spectrometry (AMS) radiocarbon calibrated age of calAD 73-226. Sutherland does not believe that piece of Arctic hare fur cordage was the work of the Dorset, but was the work of a European.

The international Helluland Project, organised by Sutherland, was to have published a book on her findings; this has been suspended as a result of her loss of access to her materials.

== Personal ==
Sutherland is married to Robert McGhee; in 2011 she was Curator of Eastern Arctic Archaeology at the Canadian Museum of Civilization and he was Curator of Western Arctic Archaeology and they were among the authors of Upside Down: Arctic Realities, the book accompanying an exhibition at the Musée du quai Branly in Paris.

== Selected publications ==
- (ed.) The Franklin Era in Canadian Arctic History, 1845–1859. Symposium report. Archaeological Survey of Canada paper 131. Ottawa: National Museums of Canada, 1985. OCLC 14414504.
- "The Variety of Artistic Expression in Dorset Culture". in: Fifty Years of Arctic Research: Anthropological Studies from Greenland to Siberia. Ed. R. Gilberg and H.C. Gulløv. Nationalmuseets skrifter, Etnografisk række 18. Copenhagen: Department of Ethnography, National Museum of Denmark, 1997. ISBN 9788789385600. pp. 287–93.
- Contributions to the Study of the Dorset-Palaeo Eskimos. Archaeology paper 167. Gatineau, Quebec: Canadian Museum of Civilization, 2005. ISBN 9780660194141.
- The Ties that Bind: Fur-Fibre Cordage and Associated Material from Dorset Palaeo-Eskimo Sites in Eastern Canada. Penelope Walton Rogers and Philip Greaves. 2018.
- Sutherland, P.D. (2009). The question of contact between Dorset Palaeo-Eskimos and early Europeans in the Eastern Arctic. In H. Maschner, O. Mason, & R. McGhee (Eds.), Thenorthern world AD 900–1400: The dynamics of climate, economy, and politics in hemispheric perspective (pp. 279–299). Salt Lake City: University of Utah Press.
- Evidence of Early Metalworking in Arctic Canada. Patricia D. Sutherland, Peter H. Thompson, and Patricia A. Hunt. 2015.
