= Avayalik Islands =

Chain of Islands in the North Atlantic Ocean

- Location within Newfoundland and Labrador Location within Canada

Geography
- Location: Newfoundland and Labrador
- Coordinates: 60.1102513°N 64.2223573°W
- Major islands: 2

Administration
- Canada
- Territory: Newfoundland and Labrador

Demographics
- Population: 0

The Avayalik Islands are a group of islands off the very northern tip of Labrador, in the Northern Atlantic Ocean, in present-day Canada. They consist of two main islands, and at least seven smaller landmasses. It was first visited by archaeologists in 1967, when a team led by Patrick Plumet arrived for the first archaeological expedition.

== History ==
The Avayalik islands were likely settled by the Middle Dorset people in the 5th to 7th centuries AD. Archaeological studies found several structures, including a winter house roughly 3–4 meters on each side, with a 3-4 meter long entrance tunnel, built during the same period.

Avayalik-1 is a Dorset archaeological site on one of the islands. It contains examples of indigenous yarn that were once suspected of having a medieval Norse origin. Dating the yarn at Avayalik-1 established an indigenous technique for spinning cordage from native animals like the Arctic hare and muskox. The yarn, like examples from other Dorset sites, was always used as cordage and never woven into fabric. Patricia Sutherland found yarn being excavated that was distinct from the sinew-based cordage typically used by Indigenous Arctic hunters. Later dating showed that it predated the Norse arrival. Analysis of the yarn showed evidence for the Dorset spinning their own cordage and trading in a network that included the Norse, but not for a Norse settlement on the island.
