= Tanfield Valley =

Archaeological site in Nunavut, Canada

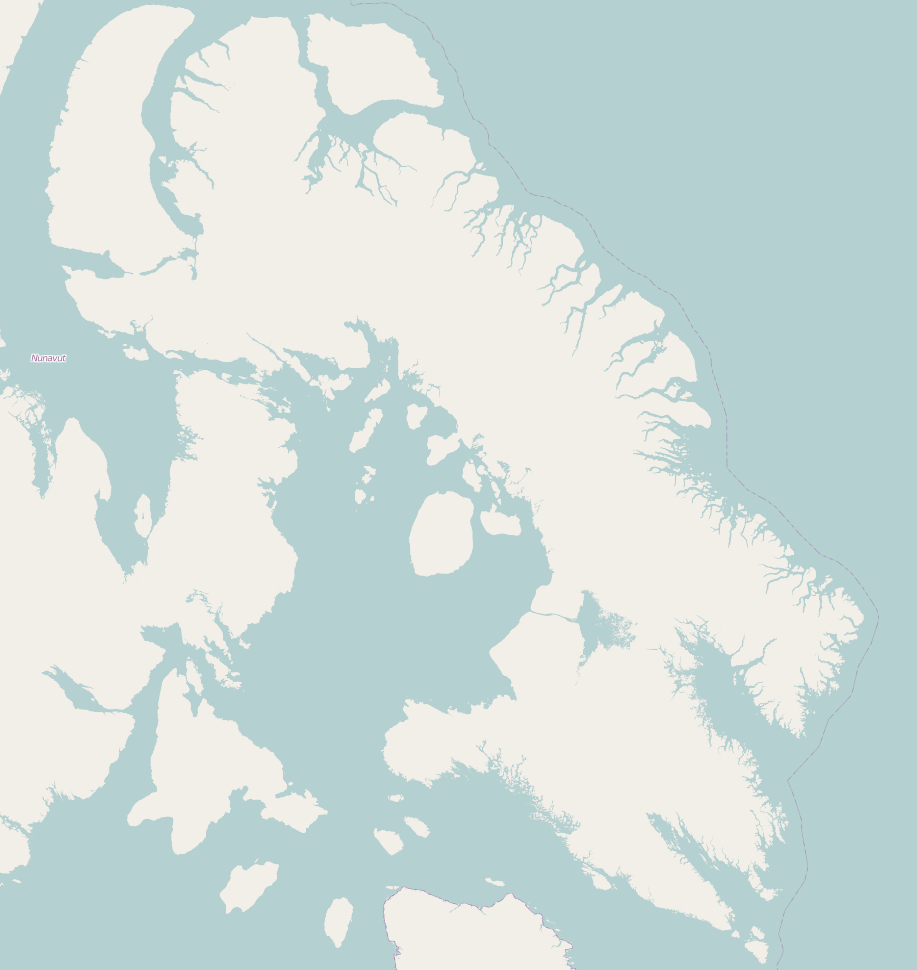
- Location within Baffin Island
- 62°39′14″N 69°34′11″W
- Location: Imiligaarjuit, Qikiqtaaluk Region, Nunavut, Canada

Site notes
- Archaeologists: Moreau Maxwell, Patricia Sutherland

Tanfield Valley, also referred to as Nanook, is an archaeological site located on Imiligaarjuit (formerly Cape Tanfield), along the southernmost part of the Meta Incognita Peninsula of Baffin Island in the Canadian territory of Nunavut. It is possible that during the Pre-Columbian era the site was known to Norse explorers from Greenland and Iceland. It may be in the region of Helluland, spoken of in the Icelandic Vinland sagas (Saga of the Greenlanders and Saga of Erik the Red).

== Archaeological investigations ==
Moreau Maxwell, Curator of Anthropology at Michigan State University, researched the site in his study of Baffin Island's prehistory, the findings of which were summarized in his publication Prehistory of the Eastern Arctic (1985). Maxwell described the structure as "very difficult to interpret".

The Helluland Archaeology Project was a research initiative at the Canadian Museum of Civilization (now the Canadian Museum of History) to investigate the possibility of an extended Norse presence on Baffin Island, including possible trade with the indigenous Dorset people. The project went on hiatus following Patricia Sutherland's ouster from the museum in 2012. While the project was active, excavations led by Sutherland at Tanfield Valley found possible evidence of medieval Norse textiles, metallurgy and other items of European-related technologies. Wooden artifacts from Dorset sites include tally sticks, similar to those from Norse Greenland.

A team led by the archaeologist Patricia Sutherland excavated a ruined stone and sod building in Tanfield Valley and found a range of artifacts that indicate a possible Viking presence on the island. This led Sutherland to suspect the building itself was Norse. Spun cordage found on Baffin Island in the 1980s and stored at the Canadian Museum of Civilization led to a more comprehensive exploration of the Tanfield Valley archaeological site for points of contact between Norse Greenlanders and the Indigenous Dorset people. At the site, Sutherland's team found whetstones used to sharpen blades. They analyzed the metal fragments still in the whetstone and found bronze, brass, and smelted iron in the medieval European metallurgy style. They also found stones cut in a European fashion, Old World rat fur, and whalebone shovels similar to those used on Greenland. While there are indicators of an early Viking presence, radiocarbon dating could not conclusively identify the site as it had been occupied and abandoned several times, with the earliest material culture dating to before the arrival of the Vikings.

A stone crucible was found at the Nanook site in 2014. The crucible used very high heat to melt down metal alloys like bronze. Indigenous North Americans did not practice this type of metal-working, but the Norse regularly did. Radiocarbon dating placed it between 754 BC and 1367 AD. Sutherland said, "It may be the earliest evidence of high-temperature nonferrous metalworking in North America to the north of what is now Mexico."

However, the eight sod buildings and artifacts found in the 1960s at L'Anse aux Meadows, located on the northern tip of Newfoundland, remain the only confirmed Norse site in North America outside of those found in Greenland.
