= Borghild Rud =

Norwegian illustrator

- Born: 20 March 1910; Norway
- Died: 25 June 1999 (aged 89)
- Occupation: Artist

Borghild Rud (20 March 1910 – 25 June 1999) was a Norwegian artist and illustrator.

Borghild Eline Rud was born at Ringsaker Municipality in Hedmark, Norway. She was the daughter of Mons Nilsen Rud (1873–1927) and Emma Johanne Nergaard (1882–1947) and was a sister of editor Nils Johan Rud. She attended the Norwegian National Academy of Craft and Art Industry where she trained under Eivind Nielsen from 1925 to 1926 and with Halfdan Strøm and Jean Heiberg from 1926 until 1930. She debuted at the Autumn Exhibition (Høstutstillingen) in Oslo during 1926. She was awarded the Benneches legat for 1928–29.

She worked for the magazine Arbeidermagasinet (later renamed Magasinet for Alle) from 1929 to 1970. Her brother edited the magazine from 1932 to 1970. She provided illustrates for books including Haugtussa by Arne Garborg and Markens gröda by Knut Hamsun. She is often most well known for her collaborations with Alf Prøysen. She is particularly familiar with the drawings of Alf Prøysen's literary character Mrs. Pepperpot (Teskjekjerringa). An almost 30-year long collaboration between Rud and Prøysen resulted in almost a thousand drawings. She made illustrations for over 800 of his texts, including all but one of his "stubben" (short works of prose) in Arbeidermagasinet.

== Related reading ==
- Lassén-Seger, Maria (2014). Empowering Transformations: Mrs Pepperpot Revisited. (Cambridge Scholars Publishing). ISBN 978-1443860024.
