= Ole Henrik Moe =

Norwegian pianist, art historian and art critic (1920–2013)

Ole Henrik Moe (11 January 1920 – 29 July 2013) was a Norwegian pianist, art historian and art critic.

He was born in Lillehammer, and is the brother of archaeologist Anne Stine Ingstad. During World War II he was a member of the intelligence organization XU. He was arrested in October 1942, and was incarcerated in the Sachsenhausen concentration camp from 1943 to 1945.

He was manager of the Henie-Onstad Art Centre from 1966 to 1989. Among his works are Slekten Knagenhjelm og Kaupanger from 1960, and biographies of Lars Hertervig and Inger Sitter. He was decorated Knight, First Class of the Order of St. Olav in 1980, and was Officer of the French Légion d'honneur. He was awarded the Arts Council Norway Honorary Award in 1995. He died in July 2013.

Awards
Preceded by Anne-Cath. Vestly	Recipient of the Arts Council Norway Honorary Award; 1995	Succeeded by Arve Tellefsen
