= Brandstrup =

Brandstrup is a surname. Notable people with the surname include:

- Kim Brandstrup (born 1957), Danish-born, British-based choreographer
- Lars Brandstrup (1913–1997), Norwegian gallerist
- Ludvig Brandstrup (1861–1935), Danish sculptor
- Michelle Brandstrup (born 1987), Danish handball player
