= Bruno Oldani =

Swiss designer (1936–2021)

Bruno Oldani (14 March 1936 – 9 May 2021) was a Swiss designer. He was born in Zürich and later settled in Norway. He was appointed assistant professor at the Norwegian National Academy of Craft and Art Industry from 1988 to 1994. Among his design works are postage stamps for the 1994 Winter Olympics. He has received prizes for book covers, album covers and skis. He was awarded the Arts Council Norway Honorary Award in 2006.

Awards
| Preceded by Agnes Buen Garnås | Recipient of the Arts Council Norway Honorary Award; 2006 | Succeeded by Jon Eikemo |
