= Arbeidermagasinet =

Norwegian literary magazine

Arbeidermagasinet was a Norwegian weekly literary magazine established in 1927. It changed its name to Magasinet For Alle in 1953, and ceased publication in 1970. The magazine is especially noted for its literary quality and its promotion of the short story.

== Editors ==
Arbeidermagasinet's first editor from 1927 to 1931 was Otto Luihn. Aksel Zachariassen edited the magazine in 1931. In 1932 Nils Johan Rud took over as editor for the magazine. In 1953 the name of the magazine was changed to Magasinet For Alle, and Rud edit the magazine until it ended its publication in 1970. In 1931 the magazine had a circulation of around 40,000. A portion of the profit was donated to a cultural foundation, which in turn contributed to the funding of the encyclopaedia Arbeidernes Leksikon. In 1935 the circulation was 100,000, decreased somewhat during World War II, and reached 140,000 shortly after the war. The number of sold copies gradually decreased, and was about 20,000 when the publication ended in 1972.

== Contributors and content ==
Arbeidermagasinet absorbed the weekly magazine For Alle and the comic magazine Hvepsen. The magazine was introduced as a non-political entertainment magazine for working people, but had a clear socialist profile up to World War II. The editorial group was affiliated to the Communist Party, but was met with little enthusiasm from the party, and lack of support led to the first editor Luihn's withdrawal. The magazine's socialist tendency gradually faded away, with more focus on literary quality.

The stories about the railway construction workers were popular. The love stories showed a conventional pattern of sex roles, but were relatively unprejudiced for the time. Feminists such as Åsta Holth and Solveig Haugan wrote about women's roles. It also featured cartoons drawn by Tore Deinboll.

Regular contributors were writers such as Aksel Sandemose, Sigurd Hoel, Arnulf Øverland and Helge Krog. Many later well-known writers, including Arthur Omre, Kåre Holt, Kjell Askildsen, Alf Prøysen, Tor Jonsson and Bjørg Vik, had their first published works in the magazine. Its editor for nearly forty years, Nils Johan Rud, received the Arts Council Norway Honorary Award, and was decorated Knight of the Royal Norwegian Order of St. Olav.
