= Tor Åge Bringsværd =

Norwegian author (1939–2025)

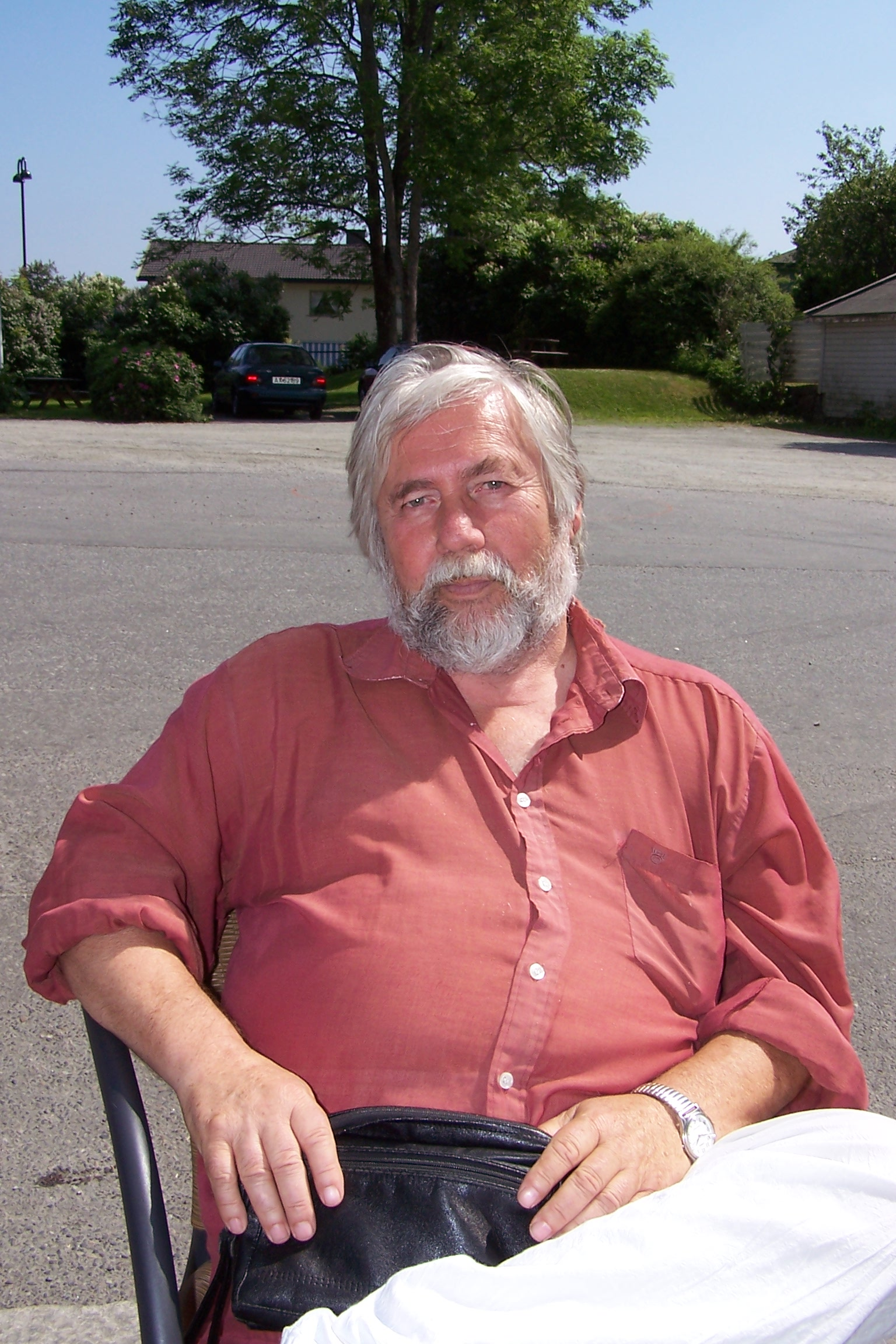
- Bringsværd in 2006
- Born: Tor Åge Bringsværd; 16 November 1939; Skien, Norway
- Died: 4 August 2025 (aged 85)
- Occupation: Author

Tor Åge Bringsværd (16 November 1939 – 4 August 2025) was a Norwegian author, playwright, editor and translator and is perhaps best known for his speculative fiction. Together with long-time partner Jon Bing, he was also considered the first Norwegian author to write science fiction literature. Bringsværd regarded himself as an anarchist, which is clearly reflected in some of his works. He is also known for his distinctive style of writing, for example, his seemingly random jumps to narratives or anecdotes with no clear relationship to the main story. Bringsværd died on 4 August 2025, at the age of 85.

== Bibliography ==
=== Novels ===
- Bazar, 1970
- Den som har begge beina på jorda står stille,1974
- Syvsoverskens dystre frokost, 1976
- Pinocchio-papirene, 1978
- Minotauros, 1980
- Ker Shus, 1983
- Gobi. Barndommens måne, 1985
- Gobi. Djengis Khan, 1987
- Uten tittel, 1988
- Gobi. Djevelens skinn og ben, 1989
- Gobi. Min prins, 1994
- Den enøyde, 1996
- Gobi. Baghdad, 1997
- Pudder? Pudder! eller: Sleeping Beauty in the Valley of the Wild, Wild Pigs, 2001
- Web. Betroelser om en truet art, 2005
- Kvinnen som var et helt bord alene, 2009
- Slipp håndtaket når du vrir, 2011
- Ikke fordi den har et svar, men fordi den har en sang, 2013

=== Children's books ===
- Tambar er et troll 2015
- Руффен, морской змей который не умел плавать
- Руффен в гости к тёте Несси
- Руффен и летучий голландец

== Prizes and recognition ==
- 1985 – The Norwegian Critics Prize for Literature for the novel Gobi – barndommens måne (Gyldendal Norsk Forlag, Oslo)
- 1994 – Riksmål Society Literature Prize
- 2000 – Ibsen Prize
- 2008 – Alf Prøysen's Prize of Honor
- 2009 – The honorary Brage Prize, an open special award
- 2010 – Norsk kulturråds ærespris (Arts Council of Norway Honorary Award)

Awards
Preceded by Mari Boine	Recipient of the Norsk kulturråds ærespris 2010	Succeeded by Inger Sitter
