= Nils Johan Rud =

Norwegian writer and editor

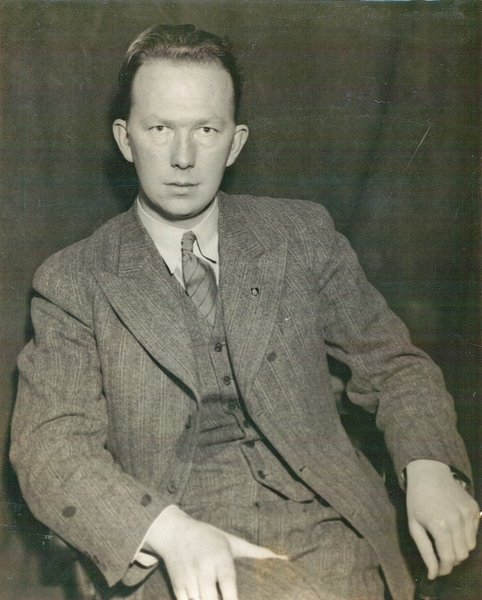
- Rud, between c.1930–1935
- Born: 24 July 1908; Ringsaker Municipality, Norway
- Died: 7 June 1993 (aged 84)
- Occupations: novelist, writer of short stories, children's writer, and magazine editor
- Relatives: Borghild Rud (sister)
- Awards: Gyldendal's Endowment (1947, 1974); Order of St. Olav (1971); Dobloug Prize (1979); Arts Council Norway Honorary Award (1987)

Nils Johan Rud (24 July 1908 – 7 June 1993) was a Norwegian novelist, writer of short stories, children's writer, and a magazine editor. He is particularly known for his long-term period as editor of the magazine Arbeidermagasinet / Magasinet For Alle.

== Personal life ==
Nils Johan Rud was born in Ringsaker Municipality as the son of Mons Nilsen Rud and Emma Johanne Nergaard. He married Aase Gudlaug Hellum in 1934, and is the father of Jazz drummer Espen Rud. He died in Asker in 1993.

== Career ==
Rud published the children's book Gutter på skoggang in 1928, and continued writing children's books. In 1930 came Karsemne, in 1931 Skaugumtrollet, and Tusser og troll in 1934. He wrote Stifinner in 1935, and Et riktig mannfolk in 1936, all books for children. The book Alle tiders største was about sports, and Rud was involved as an administrator in the club IF Frisk Asker. His first novel was Vi skal ha et barn from 1933, while his breakthrough was Jeg er ingen proletar from 1935. Among his other novels were Oppfordring til dans (1957) and Eirene (1966). He wrote more than forty books during his career. His novel Ekko i det gamle tun from 1982 won first prize in a novel competition. His last book was the novel En fremmed i speilet from 1993. In addition to his novels Rud wrote a large number of short stories. Among his short story collections were Fri Jord from 1945, and Det var en lørdag aften from 1959. he was a recognized author, being a board member of the Norwegian Authors' Union from 1936 to 1945.

Before working in the press, Rud had a number of other jobs. He worked as an apprentice at a soda factory and a tailor's workshop, and as a gardener and salesman. From 1931 to 1932 he edited the local newspaper Asker Blad. Rud then edited the magazine Arbeidermagasinet (later renamed Magasinet for Alle) from 1932 to 1970. The magazine was especially noted for its literary quality and its promotion of the short story. As an editor of this magazine Rud read and commented on more than 100,000 manuscripts.

Rud was awarded Gyldendal's Endowment in 1947, and again in 1974. From 1961 he was given the state grant for artists. He received the Dobloug Prize in 1979. He received the Arts Council Norway Honorary Award in 1987 and the Alf Prøysen memorial fund in 1988. He was decorated Knight, First Class of the Royal Norwegian Order of St. Olav in 1971.

== Selected works ==
- Gutter på skoggang. 1928. (children's book)
- Karsemne. 1930. (children's book)
- Skaugumtrollet. 1931. (children's book)
- Vi skal ha et barn. 1933. (novel)
- Så stjeler vi et fattighus. 1934. (novel)
- Tusser og troll. 1934. (children's book)
- Jeg er ingen proletar. 1935. (novel)
- Stifinner. 1935. (children's book)
- Alle tiders største. 1936. (novel)
- Et riktig mannfolk. 1936. (children's book)
- Jakten og kvinnen. 1939. (novel)
- Drivende grenser. 1941. (novel)
- Fri jord. 1945. (collection)
- Fredens sønner. 1947. (novel)
- Vi var jordens elskere. 1949. (novel)
- Både vinter og vår. 1952. (collection)
- Piggtråden blomstrer. 1954. (novel)
- I eventyrskog. 1955. (collection)
- Ettersøkte er atten år. 1958. (novel)
- Det var en lørdag aften. 1959. (collection)
- Ørretsommer og rypehøst. 1961. (collection)
- Min ungdom var en annens. 1963. (novel)
- Veier for fot. 1967. (collection)
- Eros leker. 1969. (collection)
- Brønnen. 1971. (novel)
- Noveller i utvalg. 1972. (collection)
- Av et halvt hundre år. 1973. (collection)
- Evjene. 1975. (novel)
- Breen blomstrer. 1980. (collection)
- Ekko i det gamle tun. 1982. (novel)
- Fra alder til alder. 1985. (collection)
- Spinnehjulet. 1986. (novel)
- Det har ventet på deg. 1988. (novel)
- Gammel manns høysang. 1990. (collection)
- En fremmed i speilet. 1993. (novel)

Awards
Preceded by Helge Ingstad	Recipient of the Norsk kulturråds ærespris 1987	Succeeded by Arne Skouen
