= Kjartan Slettemark =

Norwegian-Swedish artist (1932–2008)

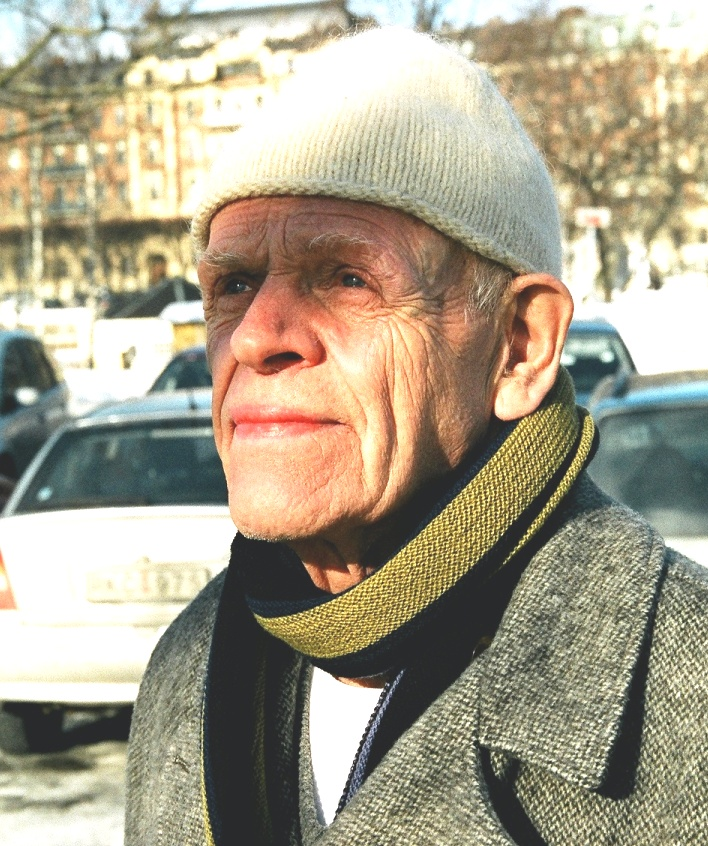
Kjartan Slettemark, 2006

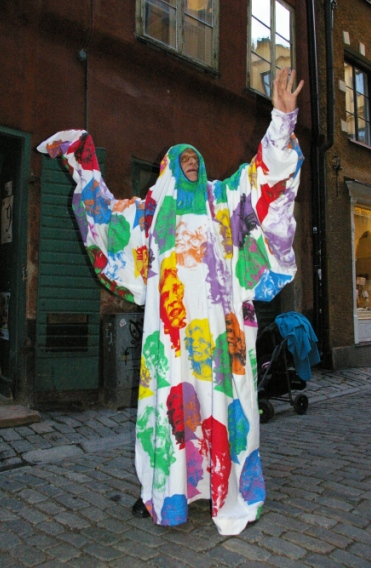
Kjartan Slettemark "gives the burka a face", November 10, 2007

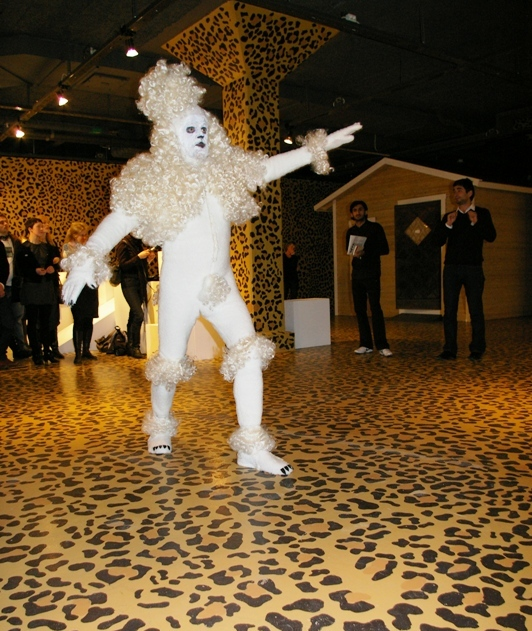
Kjartan Slettemark in his new poodle suit at Tensta konsthall januari 11 2008

Kjartan Slettemark (6 August 1932, Naustdal, Norway – 13 December 2008, Stockholm, Sweden) was a Norwegian-Swedish artist.

== Career ==
He first made a name for himself as an artist with a collage he placed in front of the Parliament of Norway in 1965, titled "From a report from Vietnam: Children are splashed with napalm. Their skin is burnt into black wounds and they die." This work consists of, among other things, a red mouth, an American flag and the figure of a child. It was donated to the National Gallery in Oslo in 1982.

He also produced passports (which resembled a Norwegian passport) for the fictional country Kjartanistan. Around 500 were made for persons interested in citizenship.

In the mid-1960s Slettemark was a teacher at an art school in Stockholm, and he took Swedish citizenship in 1966. He fell out with the school's leadership when he refused to give his pupils marks. In order to solve the problem, he handed them little colourful drawings instead. He was consequently fired, and had to apply for financial support from the social security. However Stockholm's social services wanted it clarified whether Slettemark was an ordinary unemployed person, or a patient with a mental illness. Slettemark insisted that he was an artist, but was diagnosed borderline, and received a prescription for Hibernal (tablets for treatment of psychosis). Instead of taking the pills, Slettemark used them in his art. During the happening "Lecture in the art of falling", he balanced on a line in Stockholm, visualizing his three years of conflict with Swedish psychiatry. The photographer Brita Olsson took pictures of the happening.

In the 1970s he worked on his "Nixon visions", travelling Europe with a photo of Nixon, equipped with Slettemark's hair and beard, in his passport. During this period, he also figured in a self-made poodle costume, after the inspector at Stockholm's social service had told Slettemark to report at hundmottagningen (the dog reception), instead of kundmottagningen (the customer reception). The pun is lost in English, but inspired Slettemark to spend half a year constructing the costume, complete with inlaid sound from a television jackpot programme. Slettemark only had to unscrew the costume's tail when he sat down in the tube.

In 2003 Slettemark made "Self-portrait with Marilyn", an Andy Warhol-inspired collage series, staging himself as Marilyn Monroe. Another project of his was the introduction to Kjartanistan, a non-territorial state with planet Earth as capital city, and himself as prime minister.

== Honors ==
- "Stockholm stads hederspris" 1988
- Arts Council Norway Honorary Award 2001
- "Höckers pris" by the Royal Swedish Academy of Arts 2003

Awards
| Preceded by Anne Brown | Recipient of the Arts Council Norway Honorary Award; 2001 | Succeeded by Edith Roger |
