= Ságat =

Norwegian-language Sámi newspaper

Ságat is a Sámi newspaper written in Norwegian that is published in Leavdnja in Porsanger Municipality, Finnmark county, Norway.

== History and profile ==
Ságat was founded in Vadsø in 1957 and moved to Leavdnja in 1981, where it still is based today. It maintains offices and reporters in Deatnu, Kárášjohka, Evenášši, Máttá-Várjjat, and Áltá, Norway.

The editor since 1978 has been Geir Wulff. Since October 2008, the paper has published five days per week on weekdays. Later it became a daily newspaper.

Ságat had a circulation of 2,717 copies in 2007. Although the original idea of the newspaper was that it should have articles written in both Sámi and Norwegian, today it uses Norwegian almost exclusively in its articles.

== Editors-in-chief ==
- Kristian Olsen 1956–1957
- Hans J. Henriksen and Thor Frette 1958–1961
- Hans J. Henriksen 1961–1964
- Nils Jernsletten 1964–1966
- Isak Østmo 1966–1966
- Hans J. Henriksen 1966–1967
- Albert Johansen 1967–1968
- Odd Mathis Hætta 1968–1974
- Peder Andreas Varsi, Johan Store and Arne Wulff 1974–1975
- Geir Wulff 1976
- Bjarne Store Jakobsen 1976–1978
- Geir Wulff 1978–
