= Ingeborg Refling Hagen =

Norwegian author and poet

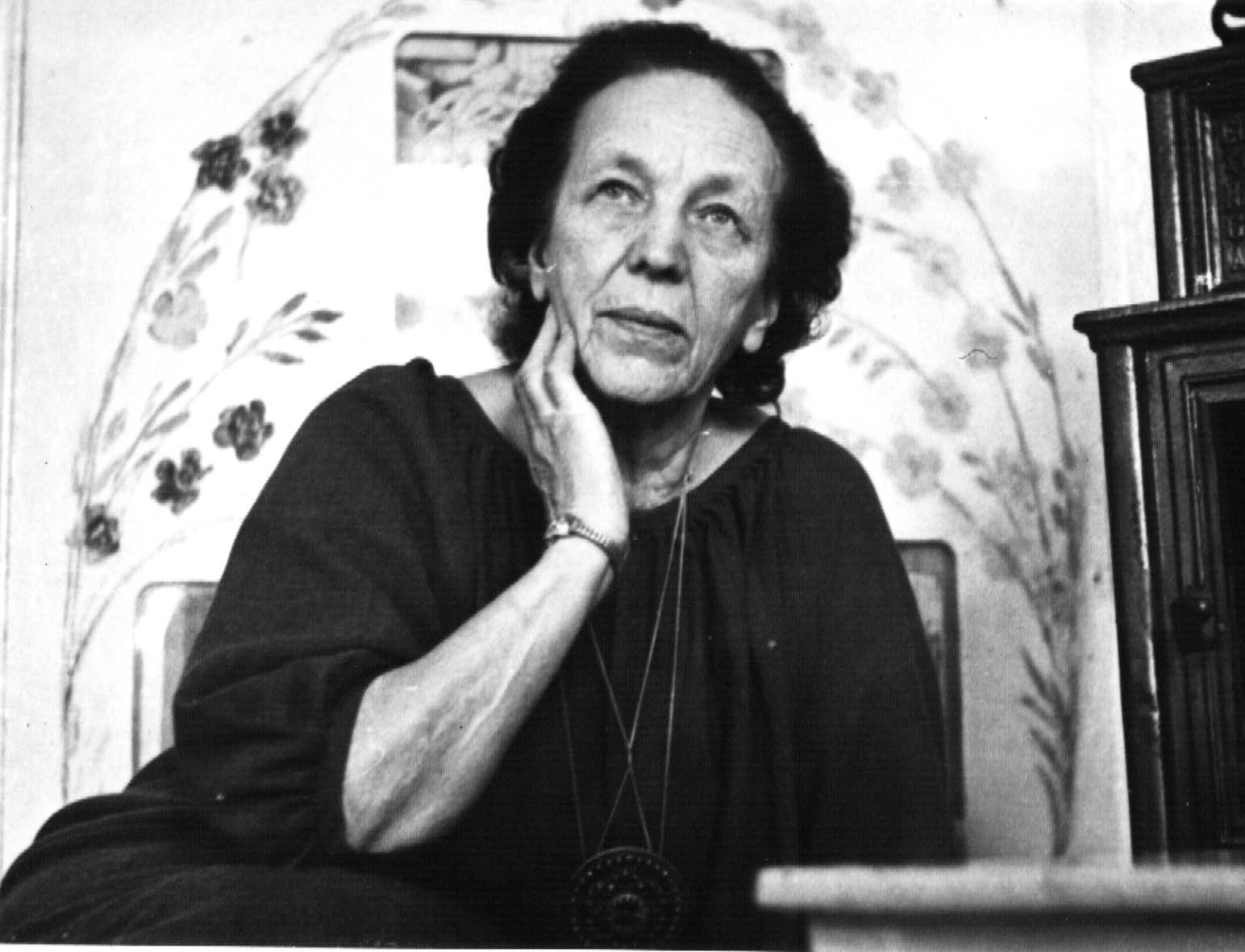
Hagen, c. 1975

Ingeborg Refling Hagen (19 December 1895 – 30 October 1989) was a Norwegian author, poet, and artistic director. Her writings and activities in support of the arts made her a significant cultural figure in Norway during much of the 20th century.

== Biography ==
Ingeborg Refling Hagen was born in the parish of Tangen in Hedmark, Norway. She was the fourth child of the local miller. Her father died young and the family had to work hard for self-support. Ingeborg and her younger sisters were forced to quit elementary school and enter into the labor market. Aside from a year at a public high school, seven years of elementary school provided her sole official education. However, her childhood was enriched by strong folk tradition and story-telling, and also a strong religious consciousness, mostly derived from her mother, who taught in the spirit of Hans Nielsen Hauge (1771–1824).

Starting in 1911, she worked as a nanny for the Kielland family at Newcastle-upon-Tyne, England. During this time, she first studied Shakespeare. She also socialized with other members of the local working class. A remembrance of her Newcastle years was the geordie accented English which she spoke throughout her life.

The experiences hard work gave her made for strong socialist sympathies later in her life. She developed sympathetic views of common people as well as the conditions of the poor. She supported the Norwegian Labour Party for most of her life although she often opposed official political statements by the party in later years. But in whole, she applauded the development of the welfare state.

== Career ==
She published her first books in the 1920s. Her novels at the early stage were expressionistic and based on her native environment in Hedmark. She was the first to make use of the local dialects from this part of Norway, thus inspiring future writers. She made a lyrical breakthrough in 1933, with a book of Immigrant poems, describing the immigrant's longing for home.

During the 1930s Hagen began to warn against the rise of fascism, along with other authors including Nordahl Grieg and Arnulf Øverland. She had made a journey to Italy, experiencing a fascist rally and a public speech given by Benito Mussolini. When she later used this experience in a novel, she was accused of exaggerations, as the Norwegian right-wing press at the time did not fully understand the actual danger.

Her political attitude led to active resistance during the Occupation of Norway by Nazi Germany. In 1942, she was arrested for opposing the Quisling regime She managed to get out of imprisonment and was transferred to a hospital. She was released in 1944 and lived in isolation for the rest of the occupation.

After the liberation of Norway in 1945, Hagen gradually built her own resistance trying to find a way to hinder fascism from rising again. This became the root of her cultural work for children, called "Suttung", rather a pedagogical principle than a movement. She gradually gathered teenagers and students around her at her home Fredheim in Hedmark. They read the classics, poets like Henrik Wergeland, Ibsen, Hans E. Kinck, Dante, Victor Hugo, Charles Dickens, Dostoyevsky and others. Further on, she studied William Shakespeare, the Greek playwrights and Homer, and folk-tales from all over the world. The movement grew and in time led to the establishment of the regional theater, Suttungteatret at Tangen in 1948. Suttungteatret was primarily aimed at drama that was neglected by institutional theaters and presented plays written by Norwegian authors including Henrik Wergeland and Hans E. Kinck among others. She served as the artistic director. Artist Gunnar Janson was in charge of scenery and Eivind Groven composed the music. From 1965, Suttungteatret re-located to the Tangen samfunnshus in Hedmark. In 1979, Suttungteatret was awarded the Hedmark Prize (Hedmarksprisen).

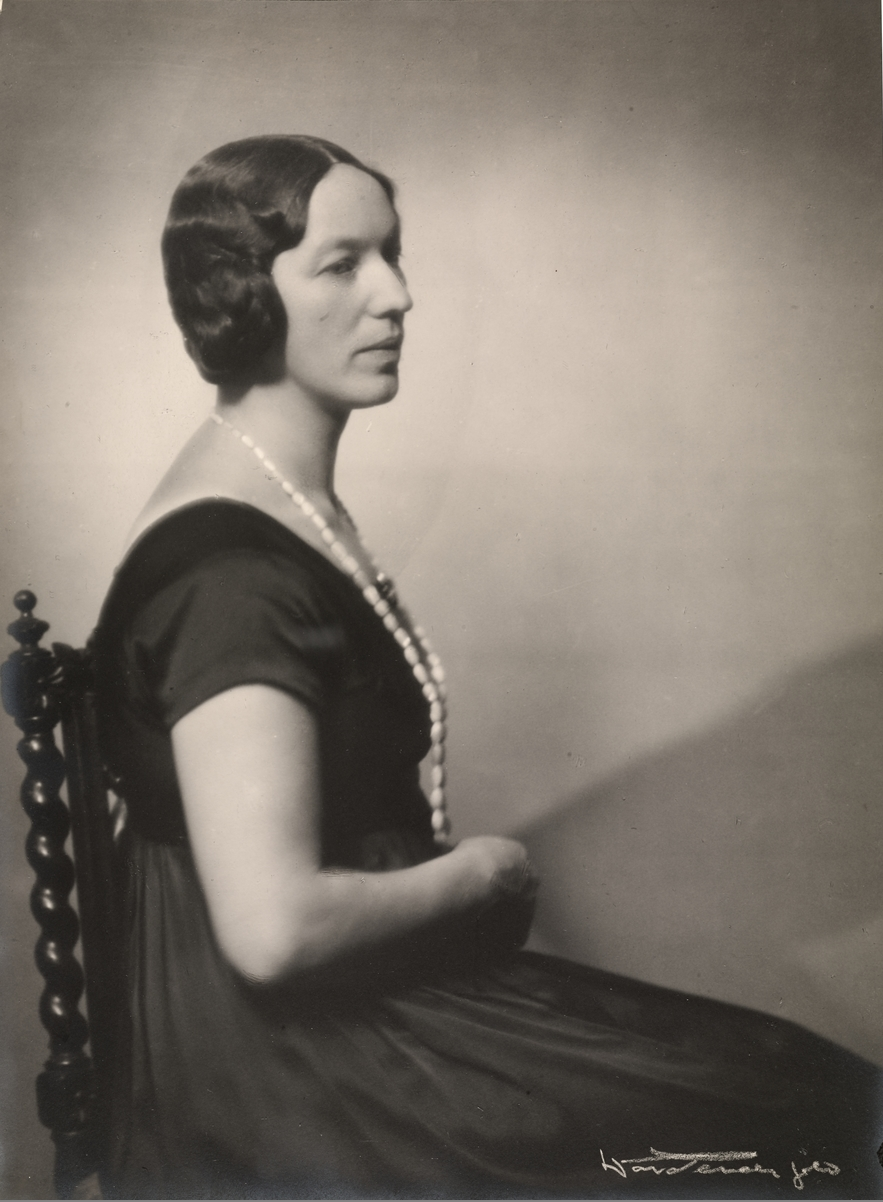
Ingeborg Refling Hagen (ca. 1935)

== Philosophy ==
Ingeborg Refling Hagen was in many ways a self-taught philosopher. In her autobiographical works, her fictional "self" learns how to listen to her own "old one" and gaining wisdom from it. In a wider sense, this way of thinking is connected to her respect for old oral traditions handed down. In many of her works, one finds an old storyteller, giving advice, pointing out the way, or setting the plot.

In her autobiographical works she also describes her visions in many places, often prompted by hard pondering on philosophical problems occurring in literature. She developed a clear feminist statement based on an interpretation of the Bible, especially Mother Mary and Eve, whom she often compared as female archetypes. She was, however, known to think of males as weaker in many ways than her own gender, and discussed many times the relationship between man and woman, and the way they treated children. She would often criticize certain types of self-righteous women. Much of her thinking in this respect derived from the fact that she herself had experienced what a defenseless child could suffer under the hands of a farmer's wife. She believed that women often would discriminate pauper's children on behalf of those they themselves had given birth to.

Ingeborg Refling Hagen's basic philosophy and thinking is a blend of Christian ideas and socialist thinking. The vision of collecting all myths and stories in one universal system of thoughts was in a way her lifelong project, as she put it: "making an archive for those that are to follow, so that they can work further". Hagen's philosophical outlook can most easily be spotted in her 1972 poem Guds Tuntre (The Courtyard Tree of God). Here, she describes the Norse World Tree Yggdrasil as planted by God, and takes comfort in the mythic explanation when she gets "dizzy from hurrying thoughts". She finds a quiet point, Tangen, and decides to work from there. Here, she finds friends and family, but acknowledges that "life comes from the same root". Yggdrasil is in fact the revolving earth, and all the world, all humanity, are inside its branches. Then, war comes, and the father in the poem enlists to defend the country. His farewell-song contains the statement that a conquering power never will win over a small country, mostly because the country always will live in the stories and the songs. The poem is patriotic, and universal at the same time. The father advises his children to:

"...learn all the stories, all the songs, all the inherited wisdom from the generations before. Own the language, and you will prevail. Through the stories, you will find your way to the roots of the old tree, which is rooted in the old days, and spreads its branches all over the world. The people with a memory will live."

== Personal life ==
In 1967, she was made a Knight 1st class in the Order of St. Olav. In 1971, she received the Hedmark Prize (Hedmarksprisen) and in 1975 she received the Norwegian Cultural Council's honorary prize (Norsk kulturråds ærespris).

Hagen continued to write until she was almost 90 years. Her dark and dramatic side mellowed in her later production. She remained artistic director of Suttungteatret until 1985.

Hagen died at her home, Fredheim at Tangen, in 1989. She was buried in the cemetery at Tangen Church (Tangen kirke) in Hedmark, alongside her sister, Hilda Johanne Hagen (1898–1972) and her older brother, Norwegian American Gustav Adolf Hagen. Her youngest sister, Ragna Charlotte Joselin Hagen (1902–1960), and her husband, composer Eivind Groven (1901–77), were buried nearby.

== Other sources ==
- Wergeland, Ingrid Elise (1995) Slik som kjærlighet vekker deg : en bok om Ingeborg Refling Hagen (Oslo : Aschehoug) ISBN 9788203261145

Awards
Preceded by Hans Jonas Henriksen	Recipient of the Norsk kulturråds ærespris 1975	Succeeded by Sigbjørn Bernhoft Osa
