= Anne Brown =

American soprano

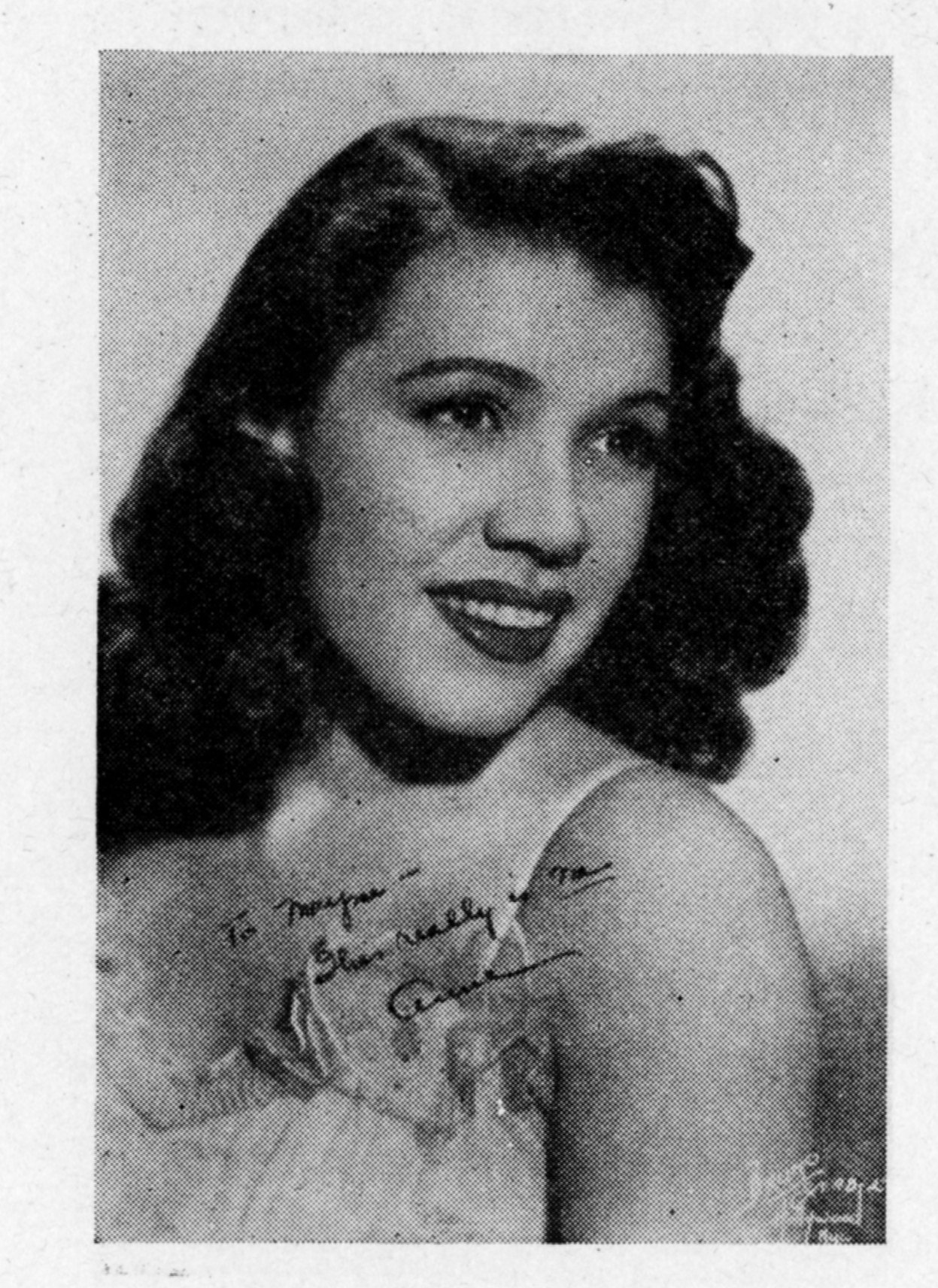
- Born: Annie Wiggins Brown; August 9, 1912; Baltimore, Maryland, US
- Died: March 13, 2009 (aged 96); Oslo, Norway
- Spouse(s): F. H. Howard; C. C. Pettit; Thorleif Schjelderup
- Children: 2

Anne Wiggins Brown (August 9, 1912 – March 13, 2009) was an American lyric soprano for whom George Gershwin rewrote the part of "Bess" into a leading role in the original production of his opera Porgy and Bess in 1935.

She was also a radio and concert singer. She settled in Norway in 1948 and later became a Norwegian citizen.

== Early life and career (1912–1936) ==
A native of Baltimore, Maryland, Annie Wiggins Brown was the daughter of Dr. Harry F. Brown, a physician, and his wife, the former Mary Allen Wiggins. Her father was the grandson of a slave and her mother's parents were of black, Cherokee Indian, and Scottish-Irish origins. She had three sisters, Henrietta, Mamie, and Harriet.

As an African-American, she was not allowed to attend a Catholic elementary school in her native Baltimore. She trained at Morgan College and then applied to the Peabody Institute, but was rejected from the school due to her race.

Brown then applied to the Juilliard School in New York at the encouragement of the wife of the owner of The Baltimore Sun. She was admitted to Juilliard when she was 16, becoming the first African-American vocalist to attend there. She studied singing with Lucia Dunham and was awarded Juilliard's Margaret McGill scholarship when she was 20 years old. At the age of nineteen she married a fellow Juilliard student, but the marriage soon ended in divorce.

In 1933, she was a second-year graduate student at Juilliard. She learned that George Gershwin was going to compose an opera about African Americans in South Carolina. She decided to write him a letter, which led to Gershwin's secretary calling her to come and sing for him. After singing several classical arias and the spiritual "A City Called Heaven" for Gershwin, Brown was frequently invited by the composer to come down and sing parts of the opera for him as he was composing the work's music. As a result, the role of Bess grew from a secondary character, like it was in DuBose Heyward's novel Porgy, to one of the opera's leading roles. Brown recalled that:

[Gershwin] would telephone and say, "I've finished up to page 33 or so. Come down; I want you to sing it. When can you come down?" "When I get out of school today," I would say. I'd always start off singing "Summertime". I loved it so. Then I would sing whatever he had written since the last time I'd been there, whatever the roles might be – sometimes I even sang Sportin' Life, sometimes we sang duets together. I knew that opera before I went onstage, not only the songs. I wound up playing about 500 performances in the original and then the 1942 revival. I can tell you what every instrument played. Finally, in our last days of rehearsals in New York before heading up to Boston for previews, George took me to lunch. "Come on," he said, "I'm going to buy you an orange juice." Then, when we were seated, he made this announcement. I remember his words exactly because they thrilled me so. "I want you to know, Miss Brown," he said, "that henceforth and forever after, George Gershwin's opera will be known as Porgy and Bess."

Brown took part of opera history when she sang Bess for the world premiere of Porgy and Bess at the Colonial Theatre in Boston on September 30, 1935 – the try-out for a work intended initially for Broadway where the opening took place at the Alvin Theater in New York City on October 10, 1935. The production was directed by Rouben Mamoulian and ran on Broadway for 124 performances. Olin Downes in The New York Times praised Brown's performance as "a high point of interpretation." Critical responses to the work were mixed; some reviewers were uncertain as to whether or not Porgy was a folk opera, musical comedy, jazz drama, or something completely different. Others expressed concerns over the use of "negro stereotypes". Brown said, "My father was very displeased. He thought that those were the old cliches of black people – dope peddlers, near-prostitutes; he especially didn't like his daughter showing her legs and all that. I thought that DuBose Heyward and Gershwin had simply taken a part of life in Catfish Row, South Carolina, and rendered it superbly."

Following the show's run on Broadway, a United States tour started on January 27, 1936, in Philadelphia and traveled to Pittsburgh and Chicago before ending in Washington, D.C., on March 21, 1936. During the Washington run, the cast—as led by Todd Duncan— protested segregation at the theater. Brown said of her role in the protest, "I told them: 'I will not sing at the National. If my mother, my father, my friends, if black people cannot come hear me sing, then count me out.' I remember Gershwin saying to me, 'You're not going to sing?' And I said to him, 'I can't sing!'" Eventually management gave in to the demands, resulting in the first integrated audience for a performance of any show at the National Theatre. When the curtain came down on the final performance of Porgy and Bess, segregation was reinstated.

== Later life and career: 1937–2009 ==
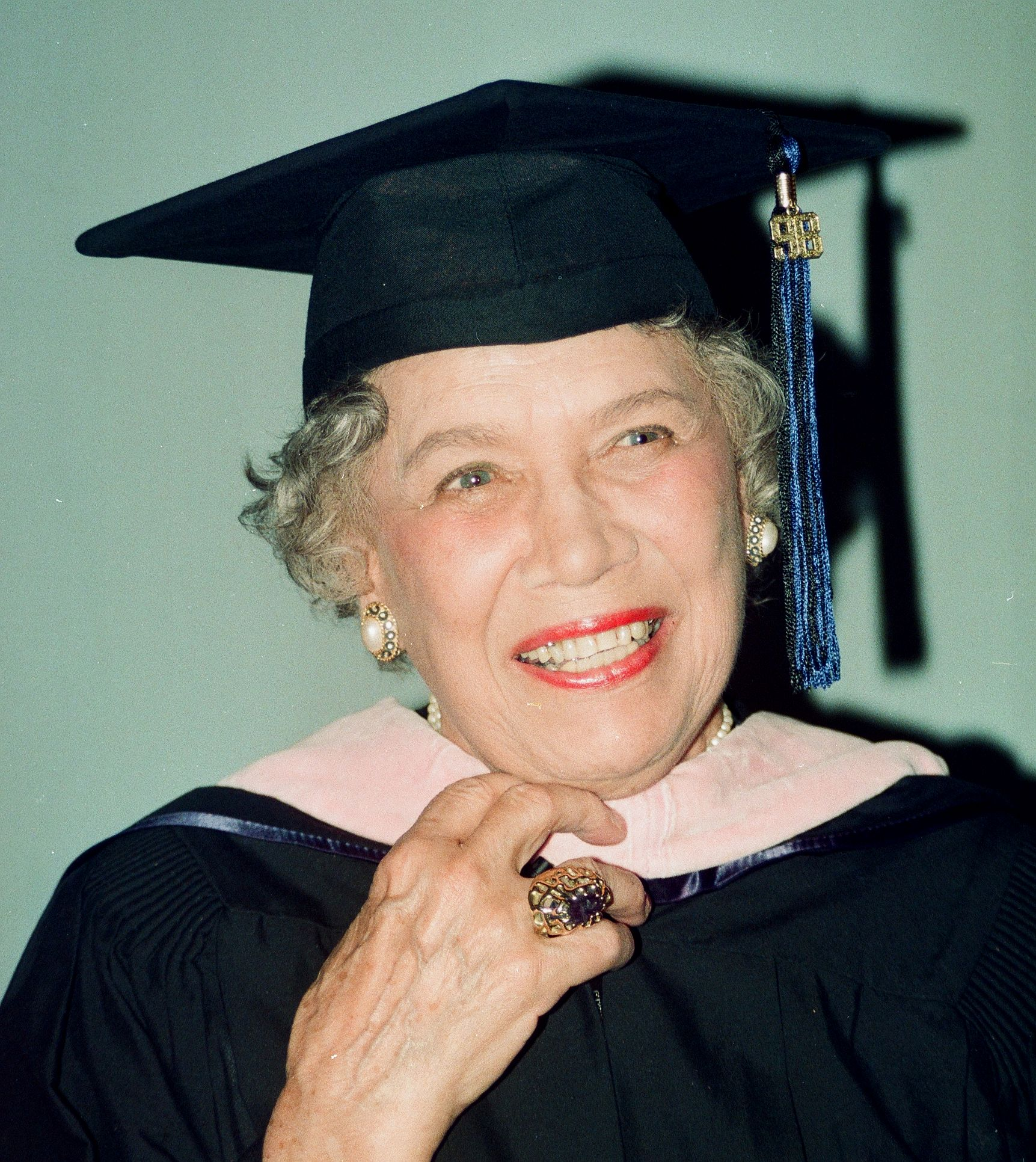
Anne Brown receiving a Peabody Award, 1998

After her appearance as the first Bess, Brown returned to Broadway in the 1937 musical revue Pins and Needles. This was later followed by an appearance in the 1939 Broadway play Mamba's Daughters in the roles of Gardenia and the "Lonesome Walls" Singer. Brown sang Bess in several revivals of Porgy and Bess during this time, including the 1942 Broadway revival. She also sang Bess for the Decca Records album Selections from George Gershwin's folk opera Porgy and Bess and sang some of Bess's music in an appearance in the 1945 Gershwin biography film Rhapsody in Blue.

Brown toured Europe as a concert artist from 1942 to 1948. Brown said that she left the United States because of continued racial prejudice. As she told The New York Times in 1998, "We tough girls tough it out. I've lived a strange kind of life—half black, half white, half isolated, half in the spotlight. Many things that I wanted as a young person for my career were denied to me because of my color". She also noted, regarding her light complexion, "Though there is no place on earth without prejudice. In fact, a French journalist wrote an article during one of my tours there asking: 'Why does she say she is colored? She's as white as any singer. It's just a trick to get people interested.' Can you imagine? Of course I was advertised as 'a Negro soprano.' What is 'a Negro soprano'?" She also stated that she felt her singing was better received in Europe because she mainly sang works by European composers, such as Brahms, Schubert, Schumann, and Mahler.

In 1948, Brown settled in Oslo, Norway, and became a Norwegian citizen after marrying skier Thorleif Schjelderup, a medalist at the 1948 Winter Olympics. He was her third husband, and like her previous marriages, their union ended in divorce. The marriage to Schjelderup was her third, his second. She had married for the first time at 19, eloping with a medical student, F. H. Howard, in New York and keeping the marriage secret from her father for two years; the union ended two years after that. Her second marriage in 1938 to C. C. Pettit produced her daughter, Paula, who was born in 1939. She had a second daughter, Vaar Inga, born in 1951 (the name means "springtime" in Norwegian), with Schjelderup, who also adopted Paula. Paula Schjelderup rarely saw her father, because of her parents’ poor relationship. Instead, Schjelderup considered Brown’s husband, Thorleif Schjelderup, to be her father figure.

Brown continued working as a professional musician into the 1950s, mostly working as a concert singer and recitalist. She did. however, appear in a few more operas, like Gian Carlo Menotti's The Medium and The Telephone. Her career as a singer was cut short due to problems with asthma; she no longer sang professionally after 1955. (She sang at the Teatro Colón in October 1955.) At this point, she embarked on a second career as a voice teacher. Among her students were actress Liv Ullmann, soprano Elizabeth Norberg-Schulz, ballad singer and former Minister of Culture Åse Kleveland, jazz singer Karin Krog, and opera singer Trond Halstein Moe. On October 9, 1980, Brown was interviewed for an article written by James A. Standifier called, "Reminiscences of Black Musicians". Brown also staged several operas in France and Norway. Brown was a guest of honor at the gala opening of the Oslo Opera House on April 12, 2008. She resided in Oslo up until her death in 2009 at age ninety-six. Her interment was at Vår Frelsers gravlund.

It is not clear if she maintained her United States citizenship as well. Her papers and personal artifacts are housed in the Amistad Research Center at Tulane University in New Orleans, Louisiana.

== Awards ==
In 1998, Anne Brown received the George Peabody Medal for Outstanding Contributions to Music in America from the Peabody Institute, the institution that had denied her music education 70 years earlier. She was also made an honorary citizen of Baltimore in 1999. In 2000, she was awarded Norway's Council of Cultures Honorary Award.

== Sources ==
- The Music of Black Americans: A History. Eileen Southern. W. W. Norton & Company; 3rd edition. ISBN 0-393-97141-4
- Jablonski, Edward and Lawrence D. Stewart. The Gershwin Years. Garden City, New Jersey: Doubleday & Company, 1973. Second edition. ISBN 0-306-80739-4
- Anne Brown, "I Gave Up My Country For Love", Ebony, November 1953
- Anne Brown Interview, "Reminiscences of Black Musicians", American Music, Summer 1986
- Anne Brown, Sang fra frossen gren (memoir, aka Songs From a Frozen Branch), Aschehoug, Oslo, 1979

Awards
Preceded by Finn Carling	Recipient of the Norsk kulturråds ærespris 2000	Succeeded by Kjartan Slettemark
