= Rolf Daleng =

Norwegian choreographer and dancer (1930–1986)

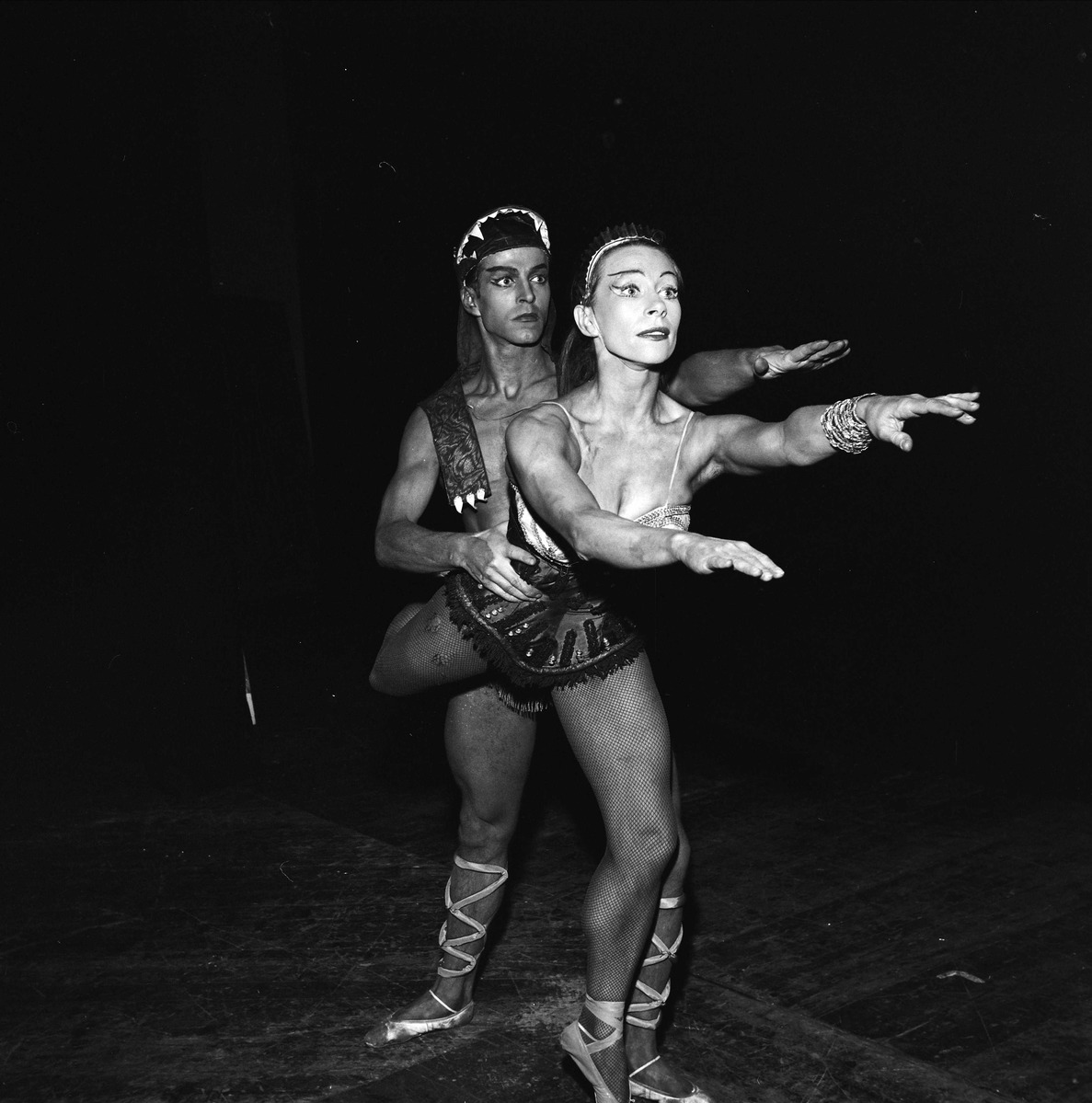
- Daleng with Edith Roger in 1959
- Born: 15 March 1930
- Died: 18 March 1986 (aged 56)
- Occupations: Dancer; Choreographer; Actor

Rolf Daleng (15 March 1930 – 18 March 1986) was a Norwegian dancer, choreographer and film actor.

He was among the first dancers appointed at Den Norske Opera, which was established in 1958, and danced the role of "Frantz" in the opening balley Coppélia. He danced in musicals at Det Norske Teatret and other stages, and participated in the 1962 drama film Tonny.
