= Edith Roger =

Norwegian dancer and stage director (1922–2023)

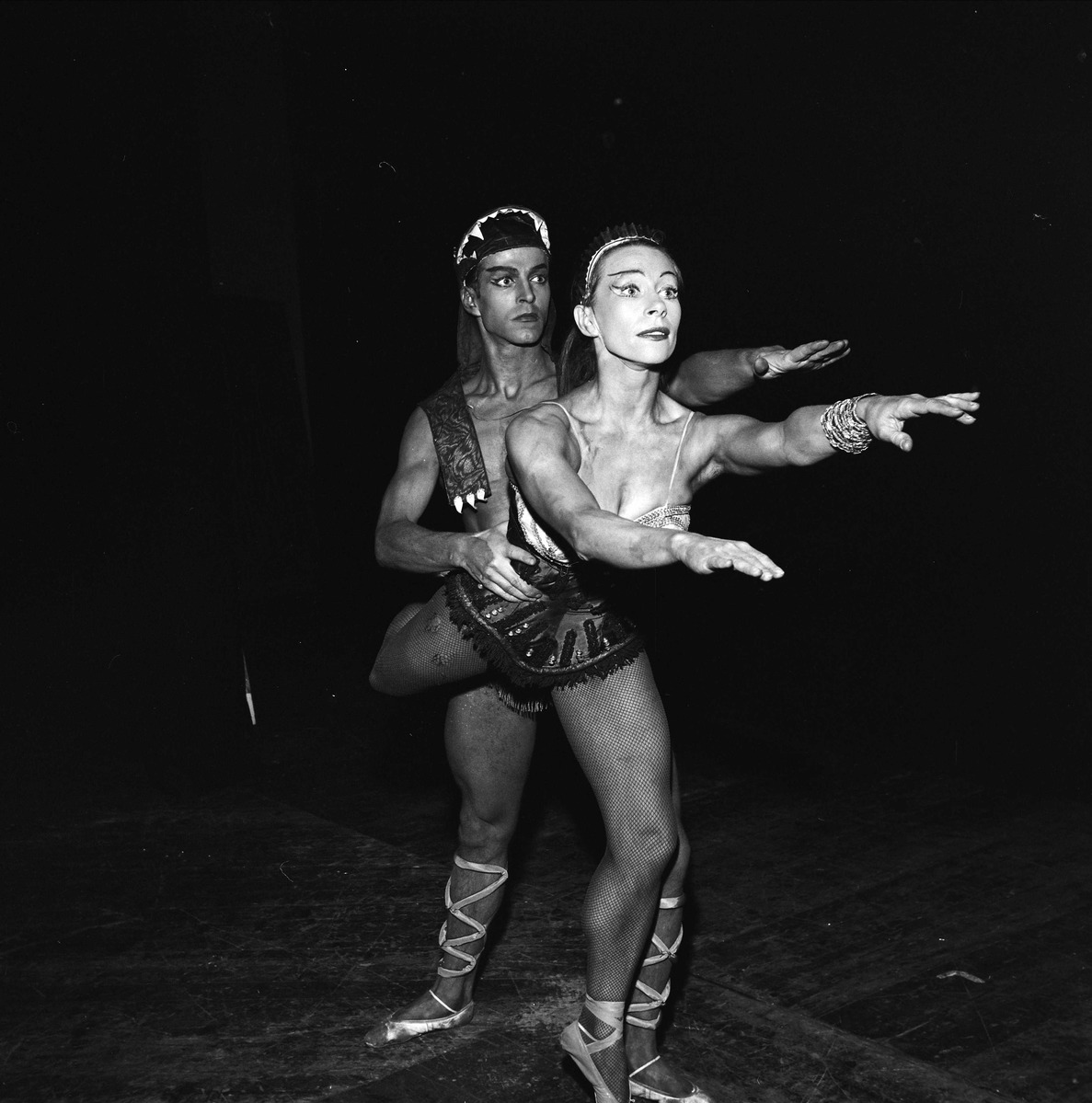
- Roger with Rolf Daleng in 1959
- Born: 29 May 1922; Vestby, Norway
- Died: 24 February 2023 (aged 100)
- Occupations: Dancer; choreographer; stage director
- Awards: Order of St. Olav (1985); Arts Council Norway Honorary Award (2002); Hedda Honorary Award (2010)

Edith Roger (29 May 1922 – 24 February 2023) was a Norwegian dancer, choreographer, and stage director.

She danced for Ny Norsk Ballett from its start, and then at the Norwegian National Opera and Ballet. After her dancing career, she was assigned to Nationaltheatret as stage director for about thirty years. A recipient of Arts Council Norway Honorary Award, she was also honoured separately for her contributions to dance, and for her contributions to theatre.

== Personal life ==
Roger was born in Son (now Vestby) on 29 May 1922, a daughter of workshop owner Conrad Hansen and Sigrid Larsen. She was married to architect Ole-Carl Øien from 1950 to 1975.

== Career ==
After moving to Oslo with her family, Roger trained classical ballet with Rita Tori, and during the Second World War she also trained free dance with Gerd Kjølaas. She made her stage debut as dancer at Rogaland Teater in 1945. She further played in revues at Chat Noir, and danced at Svenska Dansteatern. From 1948 she was assigned to the Ny Norsk Ballett, regarded among the ensemble's central performers. From 1958 to 1962 she was assigned to the Norwegian National Opera and Ballet.

Her principal roles include "Maria" in Ivo Cramér's Bibliska bilder in 1951, Medea, choreographed by Birgit Cullberg in 1955, and "Columbine" in Michel Fokine's ballet Carnaval in 1958.

She did her first choreographic work in 1954, when she contributed in establishing The Saint Olav Drama, a historical play commemorating the Battle of Stiklestad in 1030. She choreographed Haugtussa in 1958, based on Arne Garborg's cycle of poems, and Dans ropte fela in 1959, a performance with folk dance and music. In 1969 she choreographed Mot Solen, a performance inspired by Edvard Munch's life and works.

From 1967 to 1999 Roger was assigned to Nationaltheatret as stage director. Her first commissions were Peter Weiss' play Sangen om utyske at the stage Amfiscenen, and Ludvig Holberg's comedy Den stundesløse at the main stage. During her period at Nationaltheatret she directed around fifty plays. These include Ibsen's play A Doll's House (1971), Shakespeare's A Midsummer Night's Dream (1973), Ibsen's Peer Gynt (1975 and 1985), and Ballerina (1976), Further, Konsert for lukket avdeling (1979), an adaptation of Tom Stoppard's play Every Good Boy Deserves Favour, Fra regnormenes liv (1982), and Hedda Gabler (1988).

In 2005 she made a comeback as dancer, when she performed in Memento Mori, choreographed by Sølvi Edvardsen.

Roger turned 100 in May 2022, and died on 24 February 2023.

== Awards and legacy ==
Roger was decorated Knight, First Class of the Order of St. Olav in 1985, and was awarded the Arts Council Norway Honorary Award in 2002. In 2005 she received Senter for Dansekunsts Ærespris for her contributions to dance, and in 2010 she received the Hedda Honorary Award, for her contributions to theatre.

In the aftermath of her death in 2023, Ingrid Lorentzen, artistic director at the Norwegian National Ballet, expressed that Roger had had enormous influence on generations of dancers. Kristian Seltun, the current theatre director of Nationaltheatret, where Roger was assigned as stage director from 1967 to 1999, explained that Roger brought elements from dance into the stage space, and that she pioneered a playful directing style which was met with enthusiasm by the young actors.

Awards
Preceded by Kjartan Slettemark	Recipient of the Arts Council Norway Honorary Award; 2002	Succeeded by Jon Fosse
