= Erik Bye =

Norwegian-American journalist, artist, author, actor and singer

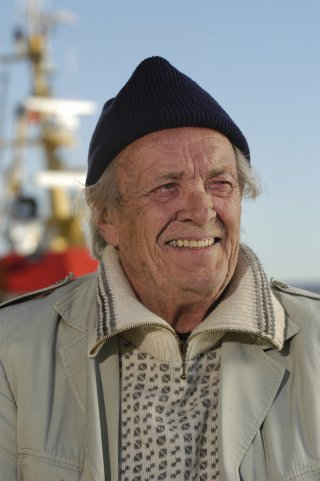
Erik Bye. Foto: Ingar Sagedal Bie

Erik Erikssønn Bye (March 1, 1926 – October 13, 2004) was a Norwegian-American journalist, artist, author, film actor, folk singer and radio and television personality. He was one of the 20th century's most well-known and popular radio and television figures in Norway.

Born in Brooklyn, New York, to Rønnaug (née Dahl) and opera singer Erik Ole Bye, his family moved home to Norway when he was six years old. After a few years in Ringerike they settled in the Nordstrand borough in Oslo, where they took over a bed and breakfast. In his teens, Bye joined the Norwegian resistance movement during the occupation of Norway by Nazi Germany during World War II. Following the war, he returned to the United States for his university education, studying English, journalism and drama at Midland Lutheran College, Nebraska and the University of Wisconsin in Madison. During his studies he also traveled extensively throughout the United States, taking odd jobs and gathering impressions.

In 1953, Bye took his first job as a reporter with the Associated Press and as a freelancer for the Norwegian Broadcasting Corporation (NRK). In 1955, he moved to London and worked three years at the BBC Overseas Service as an apprentice to Anthony Martin before returning home. Bye enjoyed immense popularity with generations of Norwegians, and his songs and programs on radio and television were magnets to audiences of all ages. He was noted for his gift of being equally comfortable with the King of Norway and a random character met on the street. His roaming reports from around the world ranged from searching America for an old Apache chief to bringing an African chieftain from Ghana who answered a message in a bottle released by NRK to Norway.

Bye was well known for his support of Norwegian sailors. He also spent much time helping the Norwegian Society for Sea Rescue and their cause, raising funds for a brand new rescue ship in 1960, Skomvær II, which was named after the barque Skomvær in Bye's song "Skomværvalsen." The society also named one of their rescue vessels after the artist.

In 1978 the King of Norway made him a Knight, 1st Class in the Royal Norwegian Order of St. Olav. In 2005 he was voted the third greatest Norwegian of the 20th century by the viewers of NRK, behind King Olav V and Einar Gerhardsen.

Bye was married to politician Tove Billington Jørgensen from 1953 until his death from cancer, which took place in Hvalstad, Asker, Norway.

== Filmography ==
- 1961: I faresonen
- 1966: Reisen til havet as Hilmar

== Discography ==
- Vi går ombord (1960)
- Erik Bye Synger Skjæraasen (1966)
- Jeg Vet en Vind (1972)
- Gjensyn (1974)
- Gammel Er Min Fjord (1974)
- Blow Silver Wind (1976)
- En Dobbel Deylighet (1978) with Birgitte Grimstad
- Norske Folketoner (1978)
- Vandring på Vår Herres Klinkekule (1985)
- Langt Nord i Livet (1994)
- En sang under skjorta- Et Visevalg Fra Skattkammeret (1995)
- I dur og brott (2003) with Royal Norwegian Navy Band

Awards
Preceded by Einar Eriksen	Recipient of the Narvesen Prize; 1965	Succeeded by Arne H. Halvorsen
Preceded by first recipient	Se og Hør's TV Personality of the Year; 1978	Succeeded by Odd Grythe
Preceded by Leo Eitinger	Recipient of the Fritt Ord Award; 1989	Succeeded by Charter 77
Preceded by Iver Jåks	Recipient of the Norsk kulturråds ærespris 1993	Succeeded by Anne-Cath. Vestly
Preceded by Axel Jensen	Recipient of the Cappelen Prize; 1993 (shared with Tor Bomann-Larsen)	Succeeded by not awarded
