= Helge Ingstad =

Norwegian explorer (1899–2001)

- Ingstad in his trapper days in the late 1920s (photo taken in 1932 from his book about Canada The Land of Feast and Famine, 1931)

2nd Governor of Svalbard Acting
- In office 28 July 1933 – 1 September 1935
- Monarch: Haakon VII
- Prime Minister: Johan Ludwig Mowinckel; Johan Nygaardsvold
- Preceded by: Johannes Gerckens Bassøe
- Succeeded by: Wolmar Tycho Marlow

Governor of Erik the Red's Land
- In office 1932–1933
- Monarch: Haakon VII
- Prime Minister: Peder Kolstad; Jens Hundseid; Johan Ludwig Mowinckel
- Preceded by: Position established
- Succeeded by: Position abolished

Personal details
- Born: 30 December 1899 Meråker Municipality, Norway
- Died: 29 March 2001 (aged 101) Diakonhjemmet Hospital, Oslo, Norway
- Spouse: Anne Stine Ingstad
- Children: 1
- Education: University of Oslo Faculty of Law

Helge Marcus Ingstad (30 December 1899 – 29 March 2001) was a Norwegian explorer. In 1960, after mapping some Norse settlements, Ingstad and his wife archaeologist Anne Stine Ingstad found remnants of a Viking settlement in L'Anse aux Meadows in the province of Newfoundland in Canada. They were thus the first to prove conclusively that the Icelandic/Greenlandic Norsemen such as Leif Erickson had found a way across the Atlantic Ocean to North America, roughly 500 years before Christopher Columbus and John Cabot. He also thought that the mysterious disappearance of the Greenland Norse Settlements in the 14th and 15th centuries could be explained by their emigration to North America.

Helge Ingstad died at Diakonhjemmet Hospital in Oslo at the age of 101.

== Early life ==
Helge Ingstad was the son of Olav Ingstad (1867–1958) and Olga Marie Qvam (1869–1946) in Meråker Municipality in Nordre Trondheim county. His father was municipal engineer in Tromsø Municipality and held the title of factory supervisor. He was the grandson of lawyer professor, Marcus Pløen Ingstad. Helge and his family moved to Bergen in 1915 where he attended the Bergen Katedralskole (1915–1918), and after graduating cand. jur. in 1922 he took up a practice of lawyer in Levanger.

== Career ==
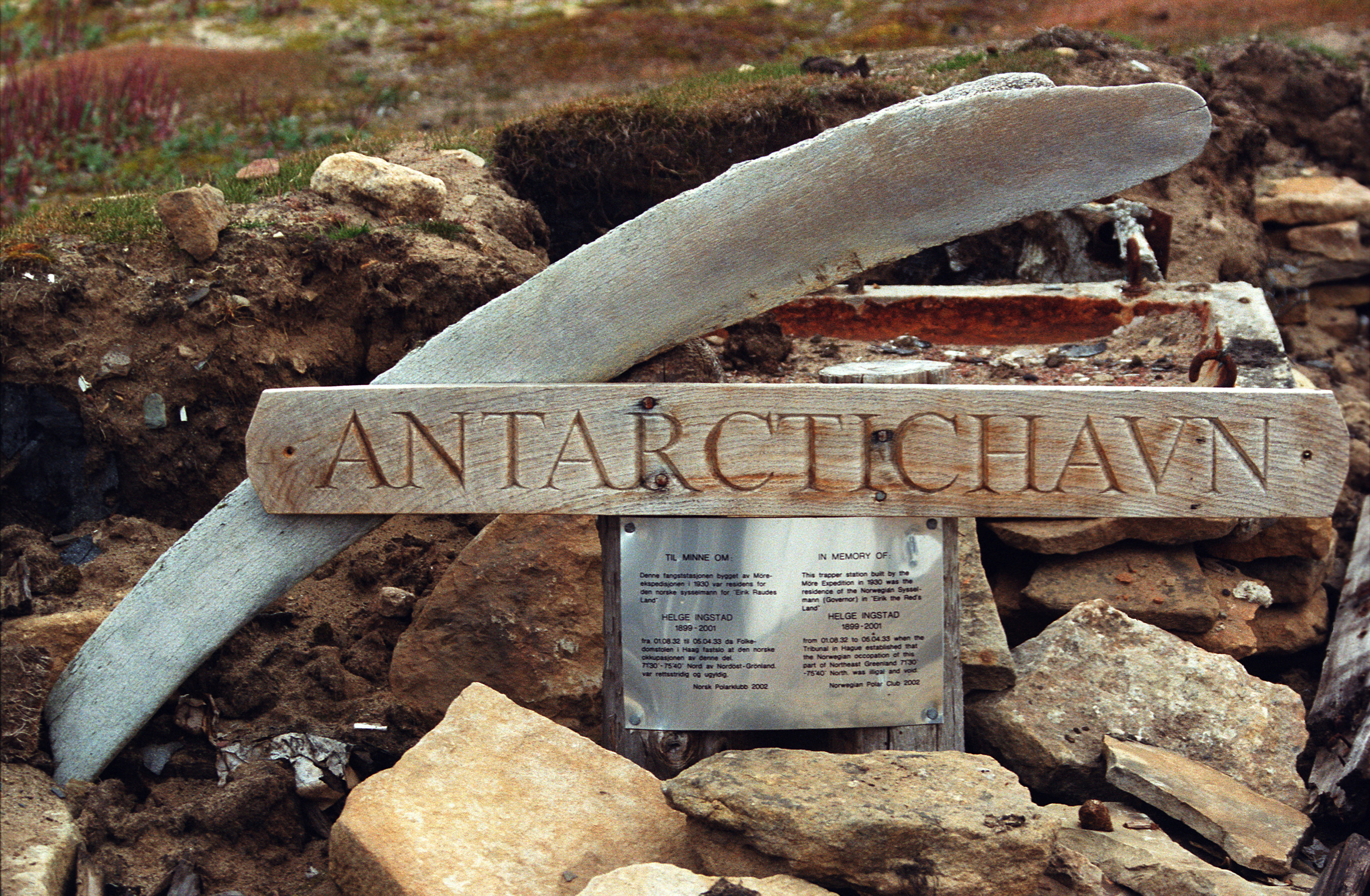
Quarterboard in memory of Helge Ingstad, the governor (Sysselmann) of Erik the Red's Land in 1932–33. Antarctic Havn, Northeast Greenland

Helge Ingstad was originally a lawyer by profession, but, ever an outdoorsman, he sold his successful law practice in Levanger and went to Canada's Northwest Territories as a trapper in 1926. For the next three years, the Norwegian travelled with the local Chipewyan group known as the Ethen-eldeli or the Caribou-Eaters. After returning to Norway, he wrote the bestselling Pelsjegerliv ("Trapper Life") about his time in Canada, published in English as The Land of Feast and Famine (Knopf, 1933).

Ingstad was the governor (Sysselmann) of Erik the Red's Land in 1932–1933, when Norway annexed that eastern part of Greenland. The Permanent Court of International Justice in The Hague decided that the lands belonged to Denmark, and so the official Norwegian presence had to end. Following the verdict, Ingstad was summoned by the government to the job as governor of Svalbard (Spitsbergen and the surrounding islands) — a position suiting him uniquely, considering his profession of law and his experience in Arctic living.

== Marriage ==
During his years on Svalbard, Helge Ingstad met Anne Stine Moe, nearly twenty years his junior. She had read his books from Canada and Greenland with great admiration, and developed a crush on the explorer. She wrote to him, and after some time of correspondence and dating, they were engaged, and married in 1941. In 1946, the Ingstads made themselves a home near the Holmenkollen area of Norway's capital, Oslo, where they spent the rest of their lives when not travelling the world. They had one daughter, Benedicte, who became a professor in medical anthropology at the University in Oslo. From her teenage years, Benedicte accompanied her parents on their exploration journeys.

== Author ==
Helge Ingstad was a popular author, whose books on his visits to remote parts of the world gained him fame in Norway. From Greenland he wrote Øst for den store bre ("East of the Great Glacier"), from Svalbard he wrote Landet med de kalde kyster ("The Land With the Chilly Coasts"). He also visited the Apache Indians of northwestern Mexico, from which he wrote Apache-indianerne - jakten på den tapte stamme ("The Apaches - The Hunt for the Lost Tribe"). After World War II he stayed for a period in the Brooks Range in northern Alaska among the Nunamiut Iñupiat, and afterwards wrote Nunamiut - blant Alaskas innlandseskimoer ("Nunamiut - Inland Eskimos of Alaska").

His 1931 book, The Land of Feast or Famine, was republished by McGill University Press, in 1992, after being out of print for over forty years.

== Viking settlement of North America ==
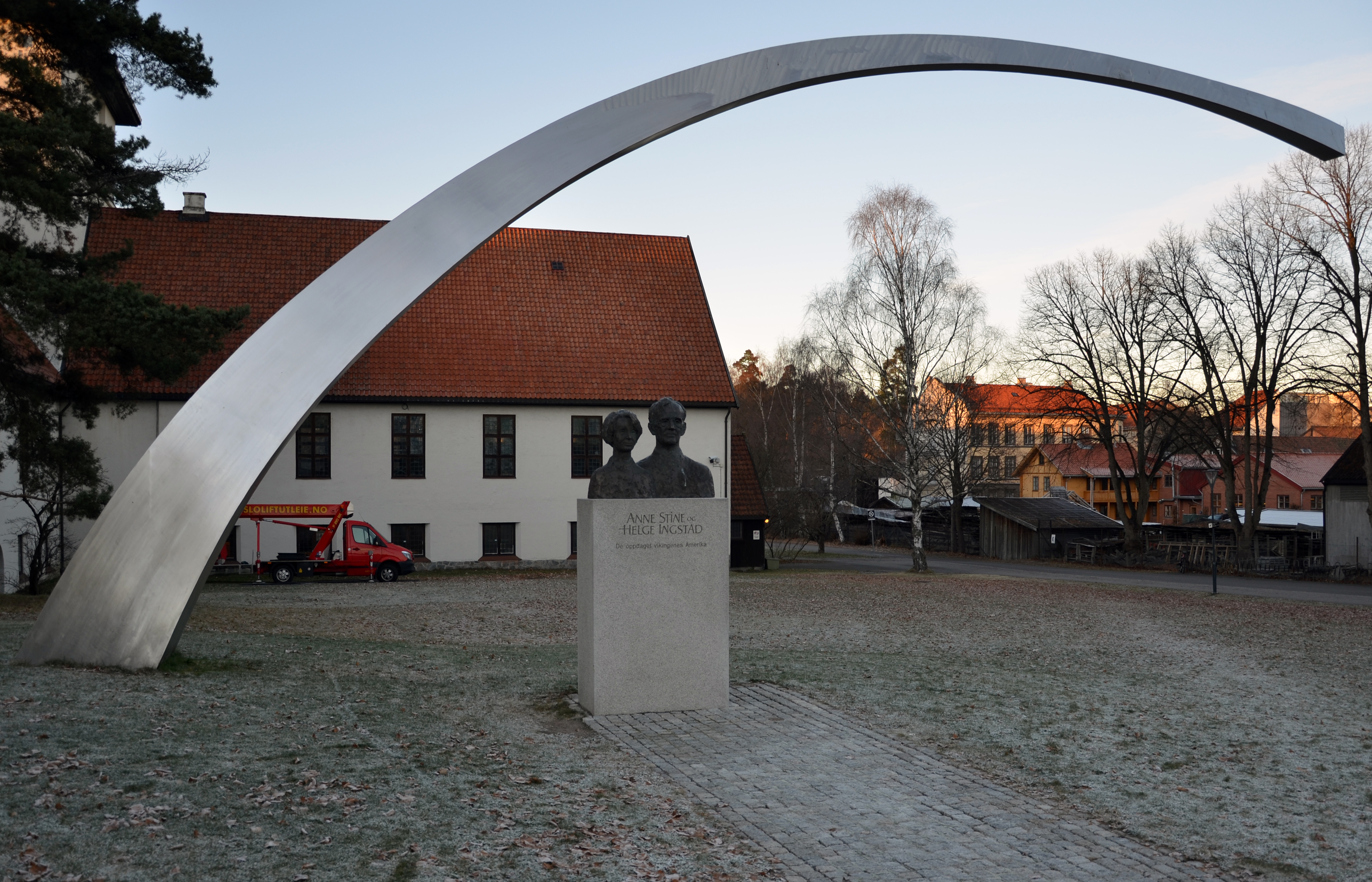
Bust of Helge Ingstad and Anne Stine Ingstad outside the Viking Ship Museum in Oslo

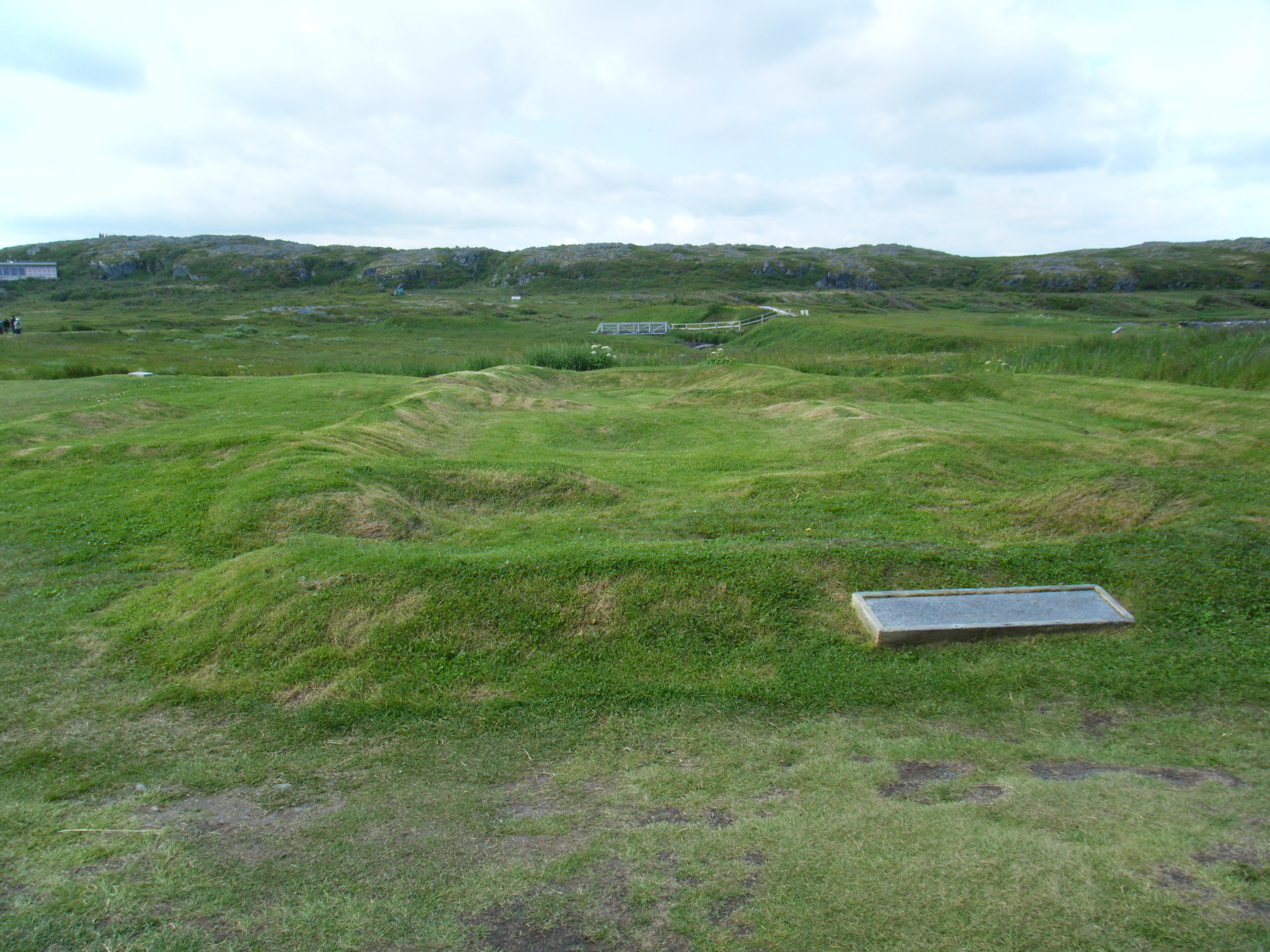
Remains of Viking building at L'Anse aux Meadows

In 1960, he discovered the remains of what later proved to be a Viking settlement at L'Anse aux Meadows at the northernmost tip of Newfoundland in Canada.

It is the only known site of a Norse or Viking village in Canada, and in North America outside of Greenland. Dating to around the year 1000, L'Anse aux Meadows remains the only widely accepted instance of pre-Columbian trans-oceanic contact and is notable for its possible connection with the attempted colony of Vinland established by Leif Ericson around the same time period or, more broadly, with Norse exploration of the Americas. Helge Ingstad stated that in 1960, when he first saw L'Anse aux Meadows,

I felt as if I had hooked a large salmon,” Ingstad wrote in “Westward to Vinland,” the 1969 account of his explorations. “It was not only that L’Anse aux Meadows was situated on the north coast, but I also remembered that when we sailed past it I had noticed the open, inviting verdant countryside. And I thought of ‘Meadows,’ which is the same as ‘grasslands’ or the old Norse vin, just what the Norsemen were looking for.

Ingstad saw the remains of "very old sod huts, barely visible under the tall grasses and wild berry bushes" and decided to excavate there at this site for the next seven years under the leadership of his wife Anne Stine Ingstad.

Archaeological excavation at the site was conducted in the 1960s by an international team led by archaeologist Anne Stine Ingstad (Helge Ingstad's wife) and under the direction of Parks Canada of the Government of Canada in the 1970s. Following each period of excavation, the site was reburied to protect and conserve the cultural resources. On August 14, 1964, two members of the excavation crew "discovered a smooth soapstone object with a hole in it...[which] turned out to be a Norse spindle-whorl, used throughout medieval Scandinavia as the weight in a device that spun wool into yarn." Initially, the Ingstads were accused of having faked their finds until radiocarbon analysis "dated objects found there to between 980 and 1020, the time of Leif Ericson’s and later expeditions" which vindicated the Ingstad's discovery of a Viking settlement at L'Anse aux Meadows.

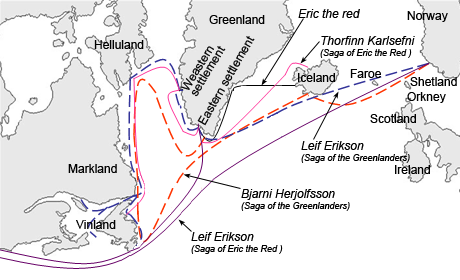
The different sailing routes to Greenland, Vinland (Newfoundland), Helluland (Baffin Island) and Markland (Labrador) travelled by different characters in the Icelandic Sagas, mainly Saga of Erik the Red and Saga of the Greenlanders. The names are the common modern English versions of the old Norse names

The settlement at L'Anse aux Meadows has been dated to approximately 1,000 years ago, an assessment that tallies with the relative dating of artifact and structure types. The remains of eight buildings were located. They are believed to have been constructed of sod placed over a wooden frame. Based on associated artifacts, the buildings were variously identified as dwellings or workshops. The largest dwelling measured 28.8 by 15.6 m (94 by 51 ft) and consisted of several rooms. Workshops were identified as an iron smithy containing a forge and iron slag, a carpentry workshop, which generated wood debris, and a specialized boat repair area containing worn rivets. Besides those related to iron working, carpentry, and boat repair, other artifacts found at the site consisted of common everyday Norse items, including a stone oil lamp, a whetstone, a bronze fastening pin, a bone knitting needle, and part of a spindle. The presence of the spindle and needle suggests that women were present as well as men. Food remains included butternuts, which are significant because they do not grow naturally north of New Brunswick, and their presence probably indicates the Norse inhabitants travelled farther south to obtain them. Archaeologists concluded that the site was inhabited by the Norse for a relatively short period of time.

== Named features ==
Helge Ingstad has two geographic features in North America named after him. In Canada, a small river, Ingstad Creek, flows into Great Slave Lake. In Alaska, the 1,461-metre (4,793 ft) high Ingstad Mountain in the Brooks Range was officially approved by the U.S. Board on Geographic Names on 19 April 2006. The name was suggested by the Nunamiut tribe in gratitude for Ingstad's efforts on their behalf.

During the last few years of his life, he worked on categorizing and annotating the large quantity of photos and audio recordings (141 songs) he had made while living with the Nunamiut in 1950. The effort resulted in a booklet, Songs of the Nunamiut, with an accompanying CD containing the audio material. This is an extremely valuable contribution to the preservation of the Nunamiut culture, because it turned out that much of what he had gathered in the mid-20th century was now lost locally and was only preserved in his recordings.

== Honours ==
He was an honorary member of the Norwegian Academy of Science and Letters. He also held honorary doctorates at the University of Oslo, Memorial University of Newfoundland in Canada, and at St. Olaf College in Minnesota. He was awarded the Grand Cross of the Royal Norwegian Order of St. Olav (in 1991; previously Knight 1st class in 1965, and Commander in 1970), Knight of the Order of Vasa, and he was presented with the Norwegian Red Cross Badge of Honour for his efforts in Finnmark during World War II. He received a lifetime government grant from the Norwegian government from 1970. He was the subject of a 1981 National Film Board of Canada (NFB) documentary The Man Who Discovered America, and subsequently appeared along with his wife in the 1984 NFB film, The Vinland Mystery. In 1986, he was presented Arts Council Norway's honor award. HNoMS Helge Ingstad (F313), the fourth of the five Fridtjof Nansen-class frigates of the Royal Norwegian Navy was named after Helge Ingstad.

The inner main-belt asteroid 8993 Ingstad, discovered by Danish astronomer Richard Martin West at ESO's La Silla Observatory in Chile in 1980, was named in his memory. The official naming citation was published by the MPC on 24 June 2002 (M.P.C. 46009).

The Helge and Anne Stine Ingstad Building on the St. John's Campus of Memorial University is named after him and his wife. It houses the University's Print and Mail Services.

== Books ==
- Ingstad, Helge; Gay-Tifft, Eugene (translator) (1992). The Land of Feast and Famine. McGill-Queens University Press. ISBN 0-7735-0912-7.
- Ingstad, Helge; Naomi Walford (translator) (1966). Land under the Pole Star; a voyage to the Norse settlements of Greenland and the saga of the people that vanished. St. Martins Press.
- Ingstad, Helge (1996). Oppdagelsen av det nye land. J. M. Stenersens forlag (Oslo).
- Ingstad, Helge; Ingstad, Anne Stine (2001). The Viking Discovery of America: The Excavation of a Norse Settlement in L'Anse Aux Meadows, Newfoundland. Checkmark Books. New York. ISBN 0-8160-4716-2.
- Ingstad, Helge; Groven, Eivind (transcriptions); Tveit, Sigvald (ed.) (1998). Songs of the Nunamiut. Oslo: Universitetsforlaget. ISBN 82-518-3778-2.
- Ingstad, Helge (1965). Vesterveg til Vinland; oppdagelsen av norrøne boplasser i Nord-Amerika. Gyldendal (Oslo).
- Ingstad, Helge (1954) Nunamiut; Among Alaska's Inland Eskimos New York: W.W. Norton
- Ingstad, Helge (1939) Apache Indianerne - Jakten på den tapte stamme (translated by Janine K. Stenehjem (2004) Apaches - the search for the lost tribe University of Nebraska Press)
- Ingstad, Helge; (1935) Ost For Den Store Bre Gyldendal Norsk Forlag, Oslo. (translated by Gay-Tifft, Eugene (1937) East of the Great Glacier Alfred A Knopf, Inc.)

== Articles ==
- Ingstad, Helge. "Vinland Ruins Prove Vikings Found the New World." National Geographic, November 1964. Microsoft Encarta 2009. © 1993–2008 Microsoft Corporation. All rights reserved.

== See also ==
- Norse colonization of North America

Civic offices
Preceded by Johannes Gerckens Bassøe	Governor of Svalbard; 1933–1935	Succeeded by Wolmar Tycho Marlow
Preceded by Position established	Governor of Erik the Red's Land; 1932–1933	Succeeded by Position abolished
Awards
Preceded by Lars Brandstrup	Recipient of the Norsk kulturråds ærespris 1986	Succeeded by Nils Johan Rud
