= Anne Stine Ingstad =

Norwegian archaeologist (1918–1997)

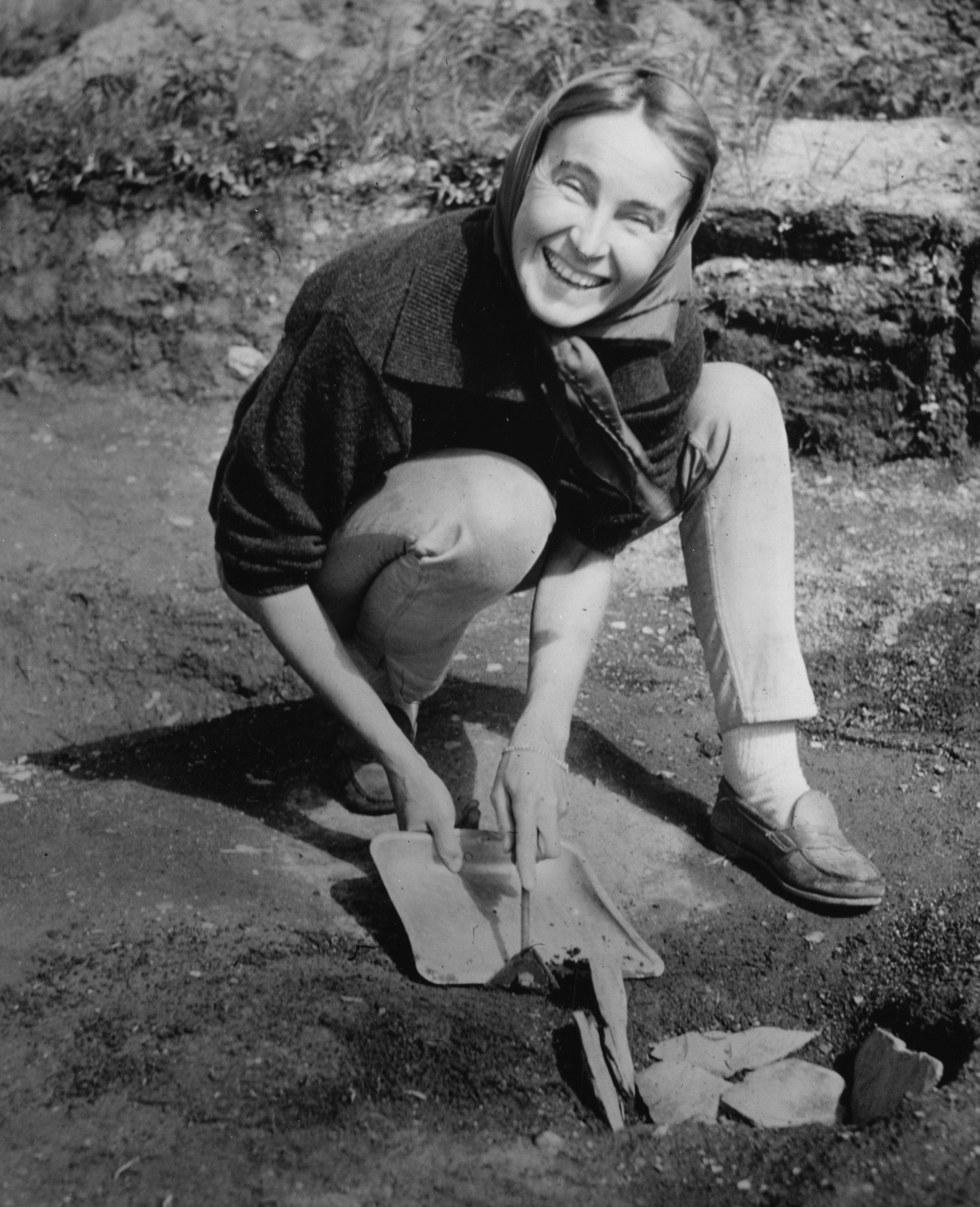
- Anne Stine Moe Ingstad at work, 1963
- Born: Anne Kirstine Moe; 11 February 1918; Lillehammer, Oppland, Norway
- Died: 6 November 1997 (aged 79); Oslo, Norway
- Education: University of Oslo
- Known for: Archeology at L'Anse aux Meadows
- Spouse: Helge Ingstad
- Children: Benedicte Ingstad
- Awards: Order of St. Olav
- Scientific career
- Fields: Archaeology

Anne Stine Ingstad (11 February 1918 – 6 November 1997) was a Norwegian archaeologist who along with her husband, explorer Helge Ingstad, discovered the remains of a Norse settlement at L'Anse aux Meadows in the Canadian province of Newfoundland and Labrador in 1960. They were thus the first to prove conclusively that the Icelandic/Greenlandic Norsemen such as Leif Erickson had found a way across the Atlantic Ocean to North America, roughly 500 years before Christopher Columbus and John Cabot. He also thought that the mysterious disappearance of the Greenland Norse Settlements in the 14th and 15th centuries could be explained by their emigration to North America.[4]

== Biography ==
Anne Stine Moe was born and raised in Lillehammer, in Oppland county, Norway. Her parents were attorney Eilif Moe (1889–1954) and Louise Augusta Bauck Lindeman (1886–1966). Ingstad was the sister of Norwegian art historian and pianist, Ole Henrik Moe (1920–2013). She married Helge Ingstad in 1941, after which she became his scientific collaborator.

She studied archaeology at the University of Oslo in the 1950s. She took a master's degree in Nordic archeology in 1960. From 1960 to 1961, she was curator at the Norwegian Forestry Museum at Elverum.

Between 1961 and 1968, Helge Ingstad and Anne Stine Ingstad conducted research resulting in the discoverery of settlement traces at L'Anse aux Meadows on the island of Newfoundland. They led an excavation of the settlement with an international team of archaeologists from Sweden, Iceland, Canada, U.S. and Norway. The excavation revealed the remains of an early 11th century Norse settlement. These remains included sod houses, a forge, cooking pits and boathouses. The settlement is now a UNESCO World Heritage Site and a National Historic Site of Canada.

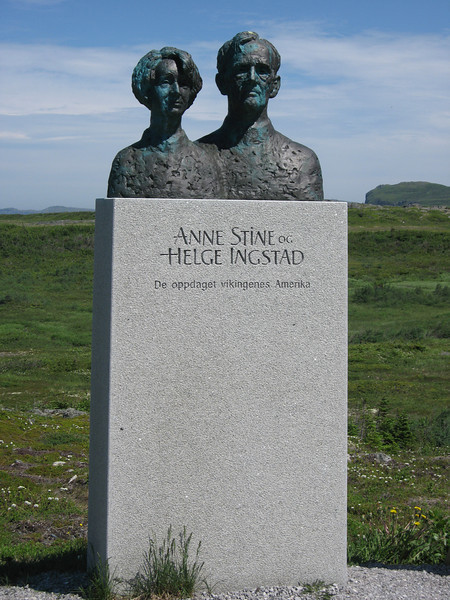
Monument to Helge Ingstad and Anne Stine

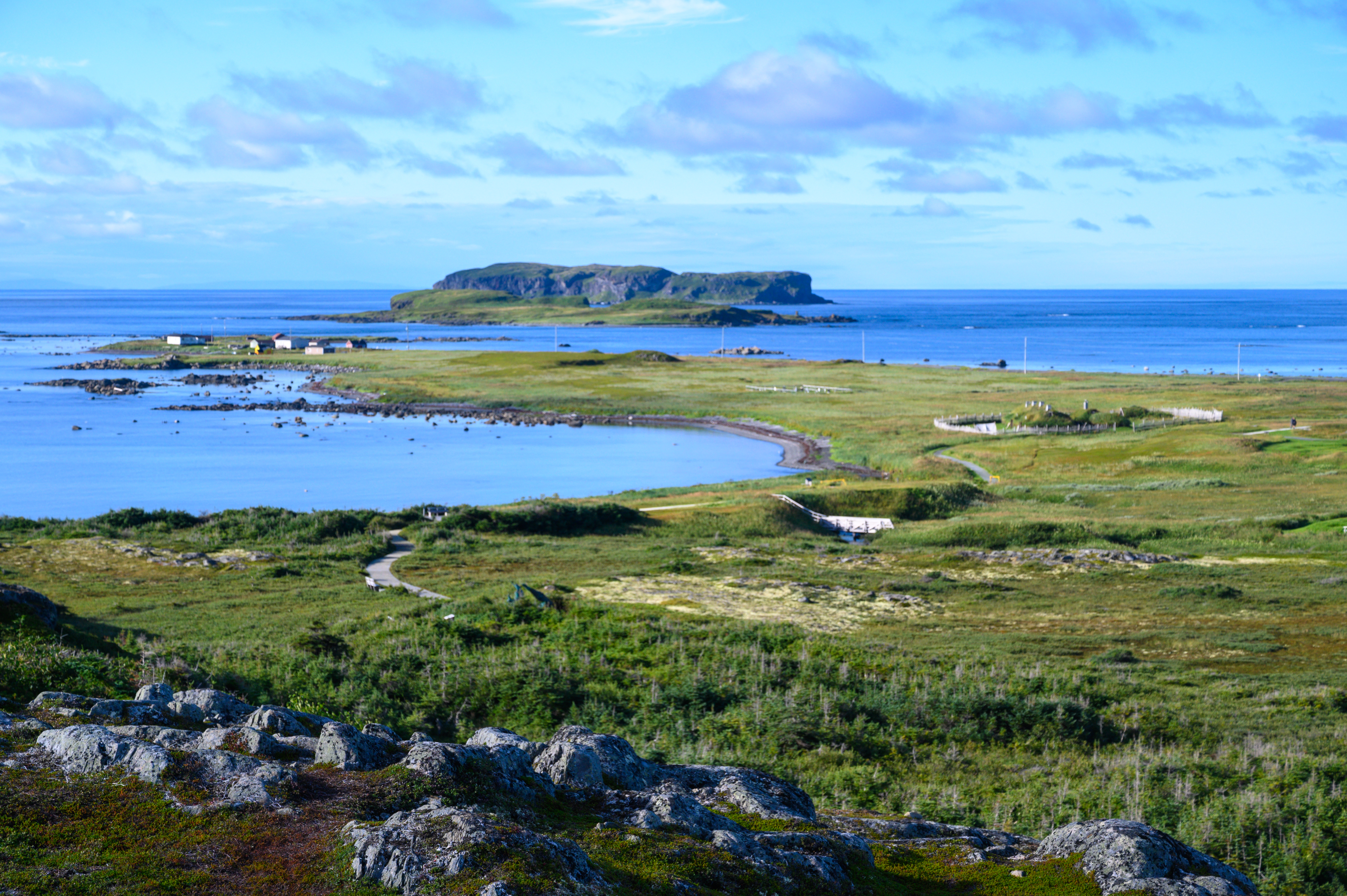
L'Anse aux Meadows Historical Site

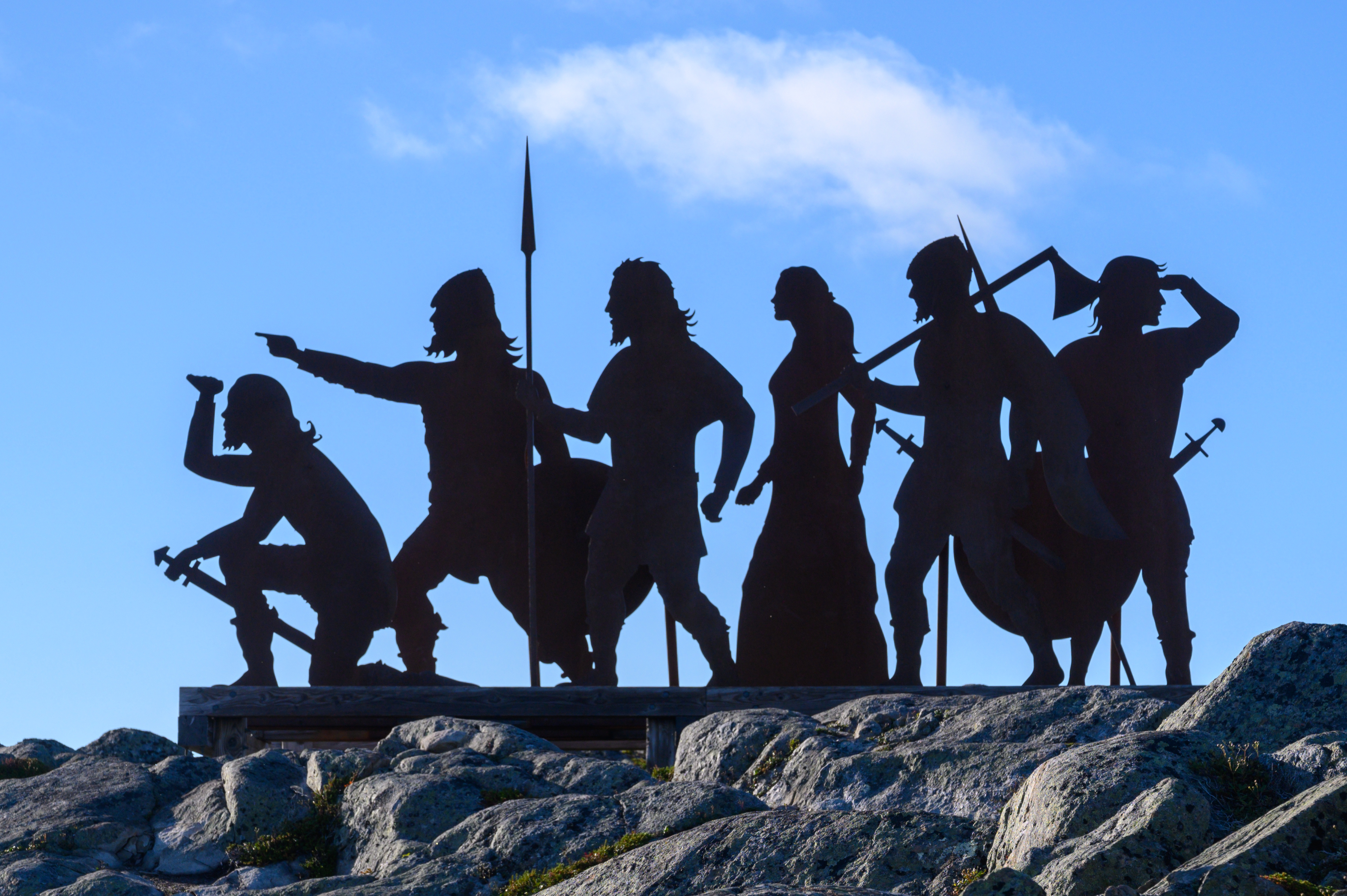
Norse silhouette sculpture

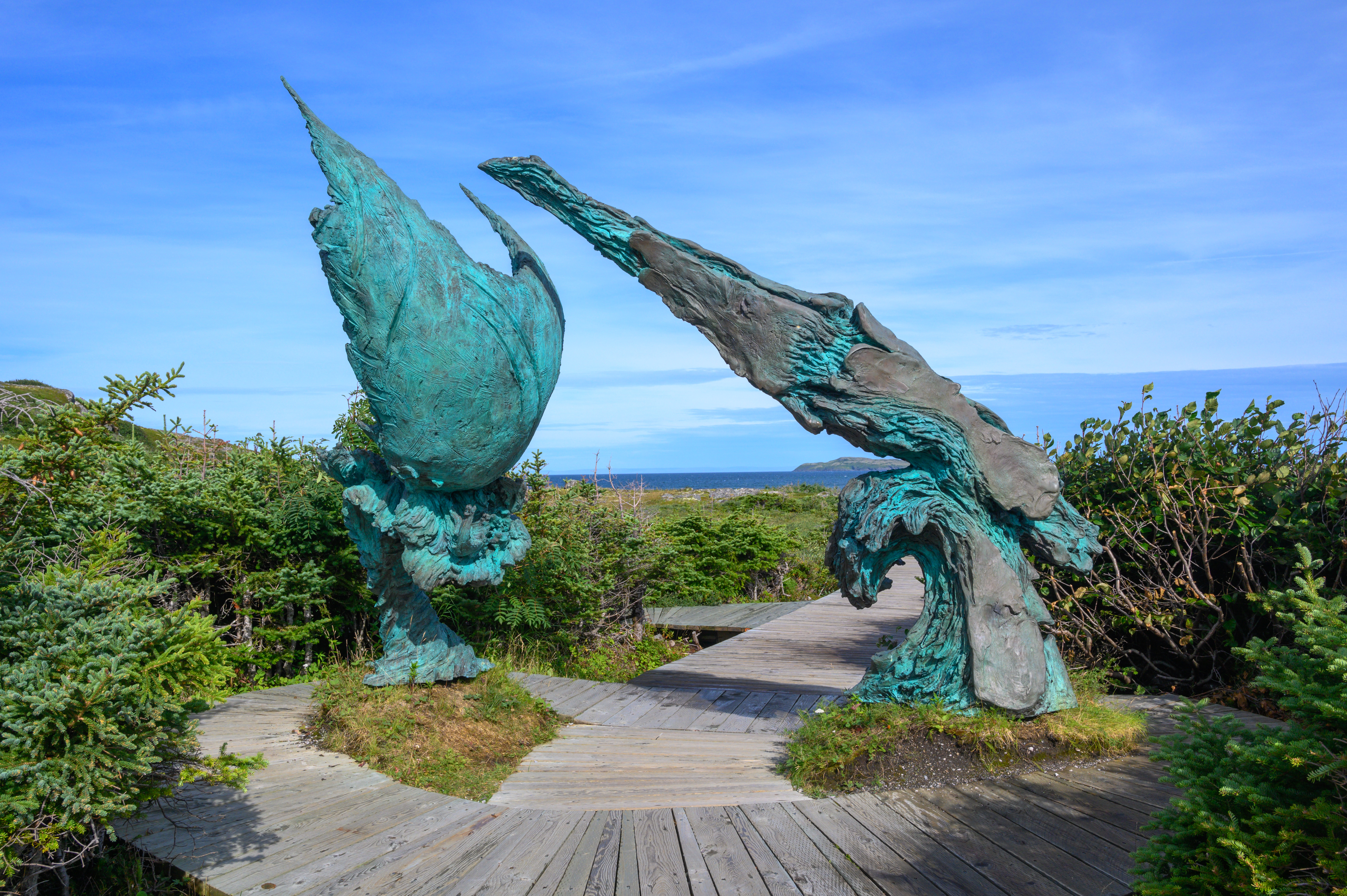
Meeting of Two Worlds sculpture

After she had become a state research fellow in 1977, Anne Stine Ingstad took up a new field of research, the processing of the textile finds from the Kaupang and Oseberg excavation sites. Following her research, together with archaeologists Bjørn Myhre and Arne Emil Christensen jr., she wrote the book Osebergdronningens grav (1992).

== Honors ==
- In 1969, Anne Stine Ingstad was awarded an Honorary Doctorate by Memorial University of Newfoundland.
- The Helge and Anne Stine Ingstad Building on the St. John's Campus of the Memorial University of Newfoundland is named after her and her husband.
- In 1992, she was also awarded an Honorary Doctorate at the University of Bergen.
- She was a commander of the Order of St. Olav and was made a member of the Norwegian Academy of Science from 1990.
- She appeared with her husband in the 1984 National Film Board of Canada documentary The Vinland Mystery.

== Personal life ==
Anne Stine Ingstad died in November 1997 at the age of 79, leaving behind her 98-year-old husband Helge and their daughter Benedicte Ingstad, professor of medical anthropology at the University of Oslo.

== Bibliography ==
- Ingstad, Helge; Ingstad, Anne Stine (2001). The Viking Discovery of America: The Excavation of a Norse Settlement in L'Anse Aux Meadows, Newfoundland. Checkmark Books. ISBN 0-8160-4716-2.
