= Hans Jonas Henriksen =

Norwegian newspaper editor

Hans Jonas Henriksen (Northern Sami: Heandarat-Hánsa; 28 October 1903 – 4 September 1977) was a Saami proponent for Sami culture and language. He was born in Tana Municipality in Finnmark county. From 1953 he chaired Samisk Råd for Finnmark, and from 1964 to 1971 he chaired the council Norsk Sameråd. He contributed to the five volume Lapp Dictionary (1932–1962; main editor Konrad Nielsen), and translated several books into Northern Sami. He edited the Northern Sami newspaper Ságat for several years. He received the Arts Council Norway Honorary Award in 1974.

Awards
| Preceded by Hans Heiberg | Recipient of the Arts Council Norway Honorary Award; 1974 | Succeeded by Ingeborg Refling Hagen |
