= Jon Eikemo =

Norwegian actor (1939–2025)

- Born: 30 November 1939; Åsane Municipality, Norway
- Died: 11 June 2025 (aged 85)
- Education: Statens Teaterskole; Royal Academy of Dramatic Art
- Occupation: Actor
- Awards: Spellemannprisen (1979); Norwegian Theatre Critics Award (1991/1992); Arts Council Norway Honorary Award (2007)

Jon Eikemo (30 November 1939 – 11 June 2025) was a Norwegian actor. He debuted on stage in 1961, and made his film debut in 1968.

== Career ==
=== Education ===
Eikemo studied theatre at the Statens Teaterskole in Oslo from 1958, and further at the Royal Academy of Dramatic Art in London.

=== Theatre ===
Eikemo debuted on stage in 1961. Between 1961 and 1978 he worked for a number of theaters, first the touring theatre Riksteatret until 1963, and then Fjernsynsteatret from 1963 to 1965. From 1965 he worked at Det Norske Teatret in Oslo, further at Nationaltheatret, Den Nationale Scene in Bergen, and Oslo Nye Teater from 1975 to 1978. From 1978 onwards he was assigned to the Nynorsk theatre Det Norske Teatret.

Eikemo played the title roles in Henrik Ibsen’s play Peer Gynt (1969) and Georg Büchner’s play Woyzeck (1975) at Den Nationale Scene. He acted in several plays by Bertolt Brecht, including the title character in Schweik in the Second World War, Puntila in Mr Puntila and His Man Matti, the chef in an adaptation of Mother Courage and Her Children, Pierpont Mauler in Heilage Johanna frå slaktehusa, and pope Urban VIII in an adaptation of Life of Galileo.

Among his performances at Det Norske Teatret were Hjalmar Ekdal in Ibsen’s play Vildanden in 1981, the joker in William Shakespeare’s King Lear in 1983, the title role in Goethe’s Faust in 1985, and Oronte in The Misanthrope in 1997.

=== Film ===
Eikemo made his film debut in 1968, with the movie De ukjentes marked (The Market of the Outcasts). Further films were Øyeblikket (1977), directed by Sverre Udnæs, Mormor og de åtte ungene i byen (1977), Mormor og de åtte ungene i skogen (1979), Orion's Belt (1985), Folk og røvere i Kardemomme by (1988, based on the children’s book When the Robbers Came to Cardamom Town), Karachi (1989), and Forfall (2002).

=== Other activities ===
Eikemo was a minor political candidate for the Norwegian Centre Party.

== Personal life and death ==
Born in Åsane Municipality (now part of Bergen Municipality) on 30 November 1939, Eikemo was a son of merchant Johannes Eikemo and Malmfrid Breistein, the third among five siblings. He was married to Mimmi Nordby from 1969 to 1980, and to Helene Sofie Rasmussen from 1986 to 1999.

Eikemo died from a cardiac arrest on 11 June 2025, at the age of 85.

== Awards and recognitions ==
Eikemo was awarded the Spellemannprisen trophy for his album with poetry by Jakob Sande from 1979. He received the Norwegian Theatre Critics Award for 1991/1992, and was awarded the Arts Council Norway Honorary Award for 2007.

Awards
Preceded by Bruno Oldani	Recipient of the Norsk kulturråds ærespris 2007	Succeeded by Solveig Kringlebotn
