= Iver Jåks =

Norwegian Sami artist (1932–2007)

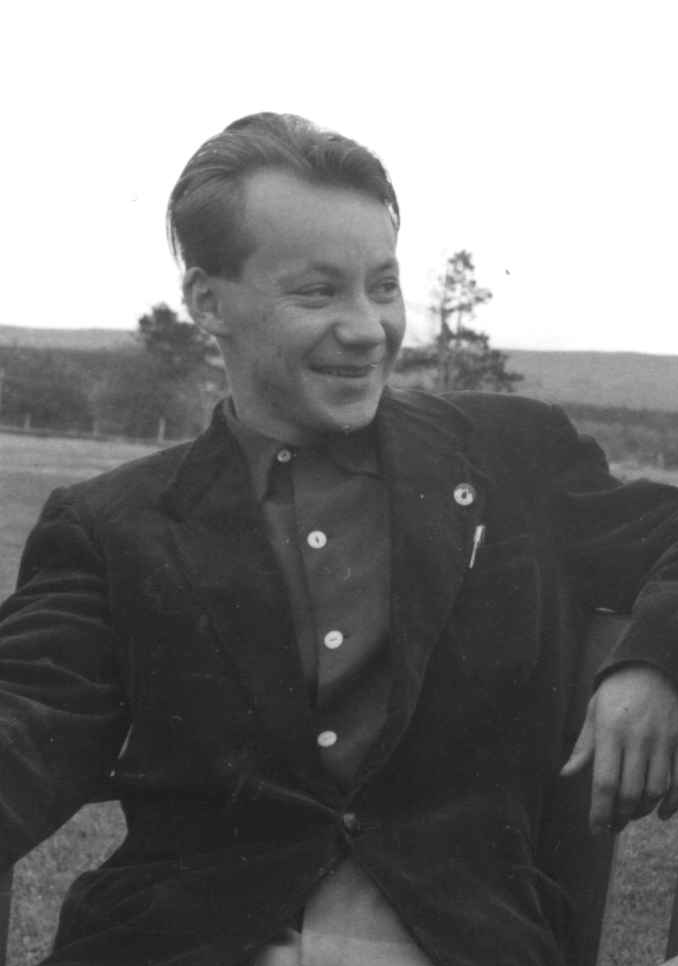
Portrett av kunstner Iver Jåks på nordisk samemøte, aug. 1956 - Norsk folkemuseum - NF.05535-196 (cropped).jpg

Iver Jåks (25 October 1932 – 17 March 2007) was a Norwegian Sámi artist, sculptor and illustrator. He contributed to the development and international recognition of Sámi art. Known for incorporating elements of Sámi culture and mythology in his work, Jåks achieved prominence through his distinctive artistic approach that bridged traditional Sámi craftsmanship with contemporary artistic expressions. Throughout his career, he played a pivotal role in museum contexts, helping to shape exhibitions of Sámi culture and developing what scholars have described as a form of "visual sovereignty" for Sámi perspectives. His artistic contributions earned him numerous accolades, including the Arts Council Norway Honorary Award, the Norwegian Sámi Association's honorary prize, and knighthood in the Royal Norwegian Order of St. Olav in 2002. Jåks's work is represented in major collections, including the National Gallery of Norway and the Nordnorsk Kunstmuseum.

== Biography ==
Iver Iversen Jåks was born in Karasjok Municipality in Finnmark county, Norway. He was awarded a place at the Norwegian National Academy of Craft and Art Industry in Oslo from 1952 to 1955. He won a place at the Royal Danish Academy of Fine Arts in Copenhagen from 1958 to 1959.

He often used elements of Sami culture and mythology in his artistic works. He is represented at the National Gallery of Norway, at Nordnorsk Kunstmuseum, and other museums. In 1982, Jåks participated in the Art from North Calotte exhibition held in Tromsø, Norway, where artists from across the Barents region—including Northern Norway, Sweden, and Finland—were invited to exhibit their work, underscoring his role in the international recognition of Sámi art. He was decorated Knight, First Order of the Royal Norwegian Order of St. Olav in 2002. Among his awards are the Arts Council Norway Honorary Award, the Norwegian Sami Association's honorary prize and the Saami Council's honorary prize.

== Collection and curatorial practice ==
In 2019, the art historian Irene Snarby examined a group of wooden elements by Jåks, acquired by the Nordnorsk Kunstmuseum and catalogued under the title Fri rekonstruksjon av to installasjoner ('Free reconstruction of two installations.' Although Jåks himself collected and shaped each piece, he never assembled them as a single work. Museum curators later defined the disparate parts as one installation, illustrating how curatorial decisions can actively construct—or even reframe—the provenance and meaning of Jåks's process‑oriented art practice.

== Museum work and visual sovereignty ==
From the 1950s to the mid-1980s, Jåks played a central role in shaping exhibitions of Sámi culture and art in both Norwegian and Sámi museum contexts. His museum involvement included exhibition design, acquisition of duodji (Sámi craft objects), and the creation of detailed technical drawings of Sámi material culture. These drawings, many of which were produced while working with institutions such as the Norwegian Museum of Cultural History and the Arctic University Museum of Norway, were not merely documentary but reflected a process of reclaiming cultural knowledge. The art historian Hanne Hammer Stien argues that through this practice, Jåks developed a visual language rooted in a Sámi epistemology—an approach she describes as a form of "visual sovereignty" that enacted Sámi perspectives within institutional settings.

Awards
Preceded by Synnøve Anker Aurdal	Recipient of the Norsk kulturråds ærespris 1992	Succeeded by Erik Bye
