= Solveig Kringlebotn =

Norwegian operatic soprano

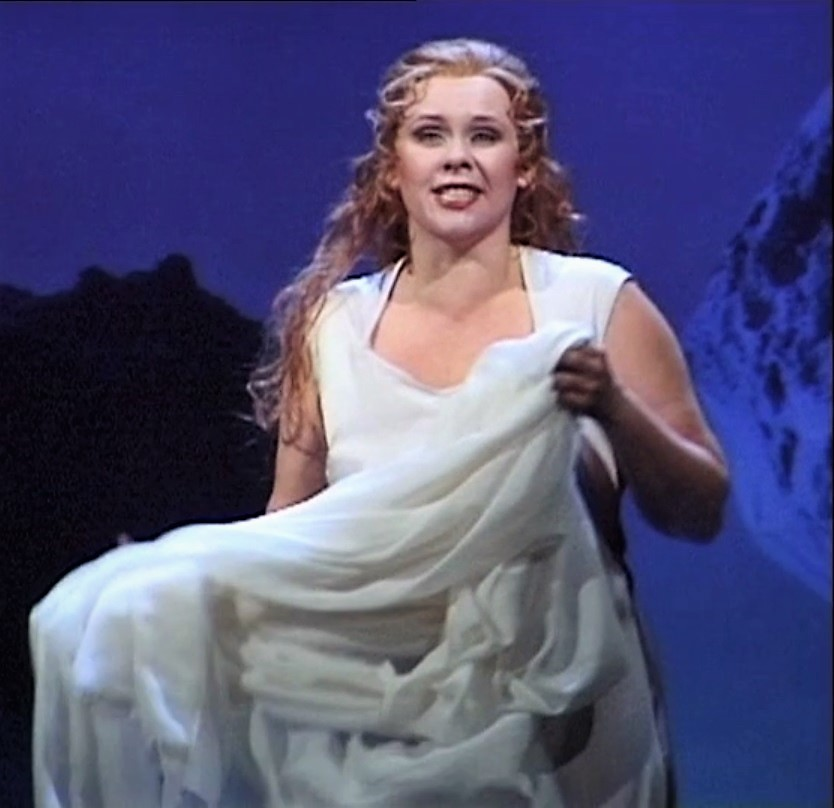
- Kringelbotn at Opernhaus Zurich in Oberon in 2017.
- Born: 4 June 1963 (age 63); Drøbak, Norway
- Occupation: Operatic soprano

Solveig Kringlebotn (Norwegian pronunciation: [ˈsûːɻˌʋæi̯ ˈkɾɪ̂ŋɻəˌbɔtːn̩]) (4 June 1963), better known outside Norway as Solveig Kringelborn, is an internationally known Norwegian operatic soprano.

== Life and career ==
Kringlebotn was born in Drøbak, Frogn, Norway, in 1963. One of Norway's most well-known classical music singers and a particular champion of the music of Edvard Grieg, she trained at the Norwegian Academy of Music and the University College of Opera in Stockholm. She made her operatic debut in 1987 at the Royal Swedish Opera.

She has toured with the Berlin Philharmonic and other leading orchestras, and sung at many festivals including the Hollywood Bowl, Edinburgh, Salzburg and Glyndebourne. She has performed several times at the BBC Proms concerts in the Royal Albert Hall and has sung in Europe's leading opera houses, including London's Royal Opera House, the Opéra National de Paris, La Scala in Milan, and the Vienna Staatsoper.

In September 2000, she made her New York Metropolitan Opera debut as Donna Elvira in Don Giovanni, and went on to sing three more leading roles there: Tatiana in Eugene Onegin, Eva in Die Meistersinger von Nürnberg, and Rosalinde in Die Fledermaus.

In the autumn of 2004 at the Opéra National de Paris, she sang in her first Strauss opera, the title role of Ariadne auf Naxos. In 2007, she returned to Paris to sing The Countess in Capriccio.

In April 2006, she created the role of Refka in the world premiere of Kaija Saariaho's opera Adriana Mater at the Opéra National de Paris.

== Recordings ==
In 1991 she gave her first BBC Proms performance and world premiere of Lutoslawski's song cycle, Chantefleurs et Chantefables. In 1998 she recorded the cycle and other songs by Lutoslawski with the Norwegian Chamber Orchestra, conducted by Daniel Harding on Lutoslawski: Chantefleurs et Chantefables. Label: Virgin Classics.

In 1998, Kringlebotn also won the Spellemann Award (the Norwegian equivalent of the Grammy Awards) in the classical music category for the album Black Roses (songs by Rangström, Grieg, Sibelius and Nielsen) with Malcolm Martineau (Piano). Label: Virgin Classics.

In 2004, she recorded Grieg's song cycle Haugtussa, Op. 67 with Malcolm Martineau (Piano). Label: NMA (Norway Music Aurora).

In 2006, she released Solveig Kringelborn – Erwartung (songs by Arnold, Schoenberg, Strauss, Wagner, Wolf and Reger) with Malcolm Martineau (Piano). Label: NMA (Norway Music Aurora).

=== Other recordings ===
- Solveig's song – Scandinavian songs. Norrköping Symfoniorkester/Lü Jia Malcolm Martineau piano NMA1
- Ludvig Irgens-Jensen To a Friend. Norrköping Symfoniorkester, cond. Lü Jia, Einar Henning Smebye (piano).
- Lohengrin (as Elsa von Brabant) ; cond. Nagano ; Deutsches Symphonie-Orchester, Berlin ; Opus Arte DVD – OA 0964 D ; Live at the Festspielhaus Baden-Baden, June 2006

Awards
Preceded by Jon Eikemo	Recipient of the Norsk kulturråds ærespris 2008	Succeeded by Mari Boine
