= Lars Brandstrup =

Norwegian gallerist

- Born: 13 April 1913; Horten, Norway
- Died: 25 January 1997 (aged 83)
- Occupation: Gallerist
- Awards: Order of St. Olav

Lars Brandstrup (13 April 1913 – 25 January 1997) was a Norwegian gallerist.

== Biography ==
Brandstrup was born at Horten in Vestfold, Norway. He was raised in Denmark and in 1950 he moved back to Norway. Brothers Lars and Niels Brandstrup established Galleri F 15 in Moss during 1962. In retirement, he established Galleri Brandstrup in Moss during 1986 along with his son, Kim Brandstrup. In 2002, Kim Brandstrup relocated the gallery to Oslo.

He was decorated Knight of the Order of St. Olav, Knight of the Order of the Polar Star, and Knight of the Order of the Dannebrog. He was awarded the Arts Council Norway Honorary Award in 1985.

Awards
Preceded by Helge Sivertsen	Recipient of the Arts Council Norway Honorary Award; 1985	Succeeded by Helge Ingstad
