= Inger Sitter =

Norwegian artist (1929–2015)

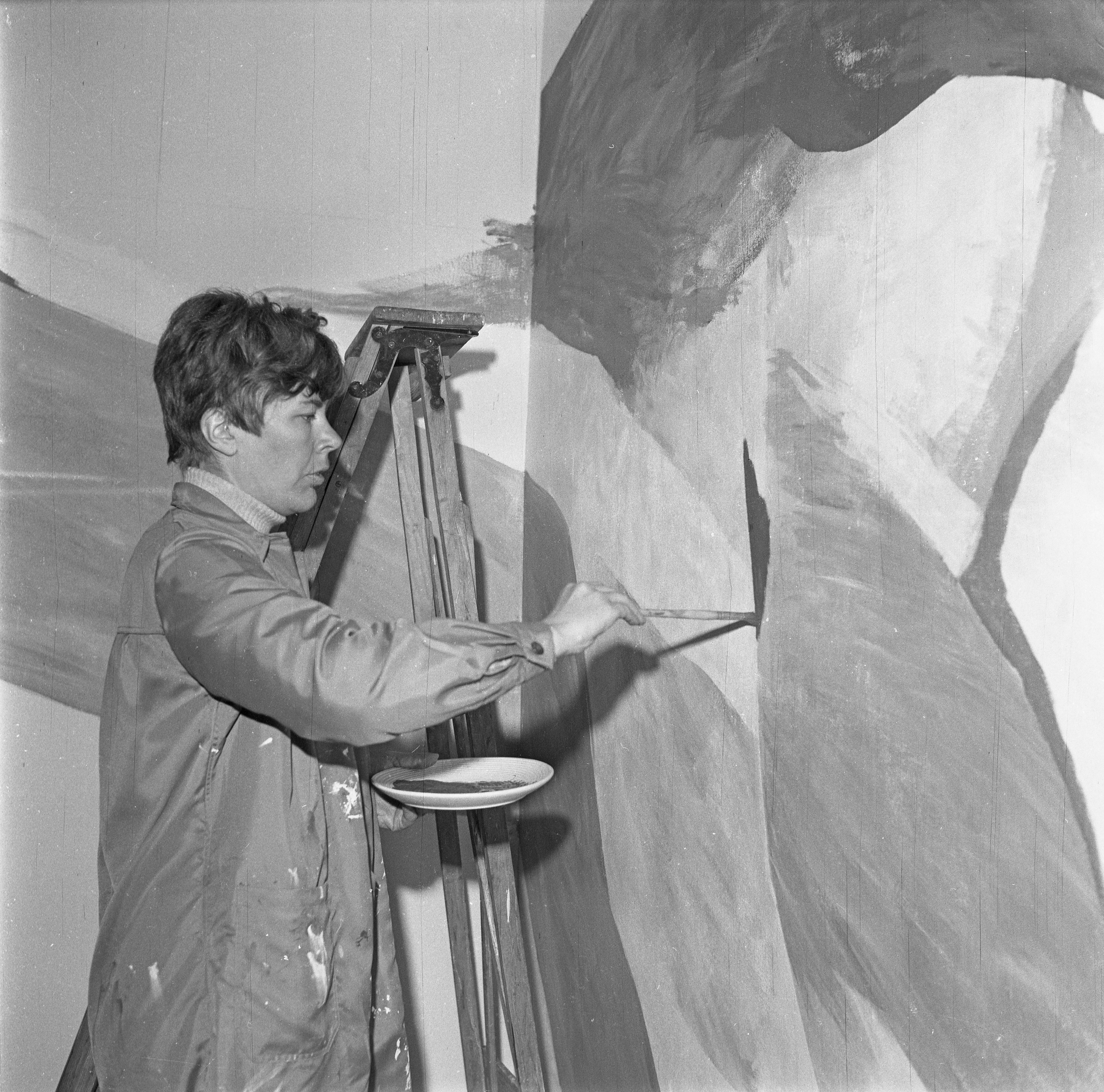
- Sitter in 1967
- Born: Inger Solveig Sitter; 18 October 1929; Trondheim, Norway
- Died: 11 March 2015 (aged 85); Tjøme, Norway
- Occupations: Painter; Graphical artist
- Awards: Prince Eugen Medal (1983); Order of St. Olav (Knight 1998, Commander 2010); Arts Council Norway Honorary Award (2011)

Inger Solveig Sitter (18 October 1929 – 11 March 2015) was a Norwegian painter, graphic artist and art instructor.

== Personal life ==
Sitter was born in Trondheim to Ingvar Sitter and Ebba Pelander. She grew up partly on her father's ships, which sailed in European and other waters, and partly with her mother in Antwerp, where she went to primary school.

== Career ==
Sitter studied at the Norwegian National Academy of Fine Arts at Oslo under Per Krohg, Axel Revold and Jean Heiberg from 1945 to 1946. She trained at the Institut Supérieur des Beaux Arts in Antwerp from 1946 to 1950. She was a student of André Lhote during 1948 and with Stanley William Hayter 1954-55 and 1956–57. She conducted various study trips to Italy, Spain, France, The Netherlands, Belgium, England, Sweden and Finland between 1947 and 1962.

She was the recipient of numerous awards including Schäffers legat (1951), Ragnhild Keysers legat (1952), Helga og Hans Reusch' legat (1953), Fransk statsstipend (1956–57), Ragnar Moltzaus legat (1957), Hans Evensens legat (1960) and Th. Fearnleys Minnestipend (1961). During her working career she settled in various countries, mostly in Norway, Italy and France. She was a resident in Antwerp 1947–50.

She was a board member of Unge Kunstneres Samfund from 1952 to 1954, board member of Norske Grafikere from 1955 to 1958, and member of the Arts Council Norway from 1964 to 1968. She was appointed professor at the Norwegian National Academy of Fine Arts from 1981 to 1984. Among her works are wall decorations of the Government building in Oslo from the 1950s (in cooperation with her husband Nesjar and other artists). Her works are included in the permanent collections of several museums, including the National Gallery of Norway and Henie-Onstad Art Centre in Oslo, at Moderna Museet in Stockholm, and at Statens Museum for Kunst in Copenhagen.

Sitter was awarded the Prince Eugen Medal for painting in 1983. She was decorated Knight, First Class of the Order of St. Olav in 1998, and Commander in 2010. She was awarded the Arts Council Norway Honorary Award in 2011.

== Personal life ==
She was married twice, first to visual artist Carl Nesjar (1920–2015) from 1955 to 1967, and second to gallery owner Rolf Dahlström (1927–1999).

In 2015, Sitter died at the age of 85. She was buried at Vestre gravlund in Oslo.

Awards
Preceded by Tor Åge Bringsværd	Recipient of the Arts Council Norway Honorary Award; 2011	Succeeded by Soon-Mi Chung & Stephan Barratt-Due
