= Arts Council Norway Honorary Award =

Annual Norwegian arts award

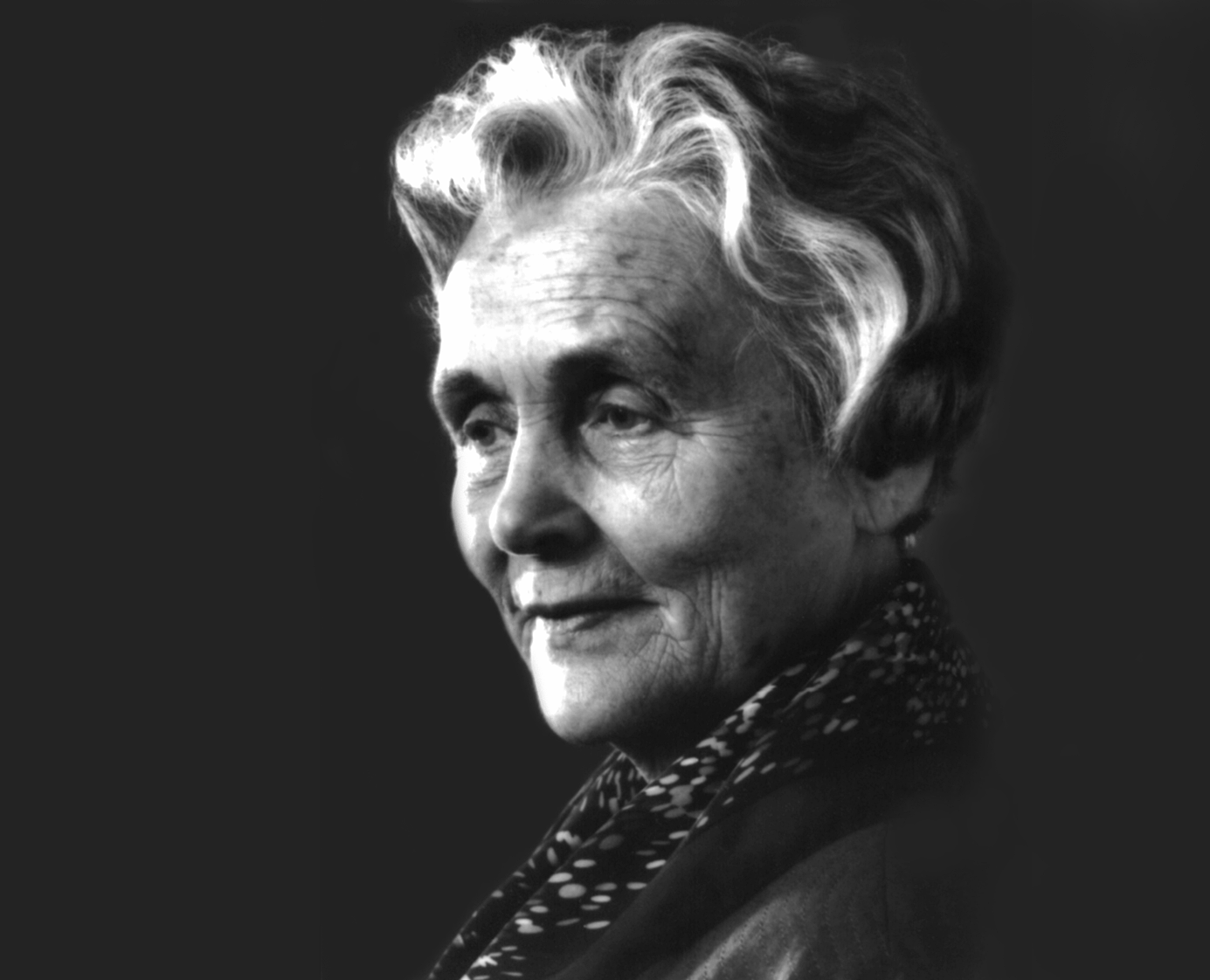
Halldis Moren Vesaas, 1982 recipient

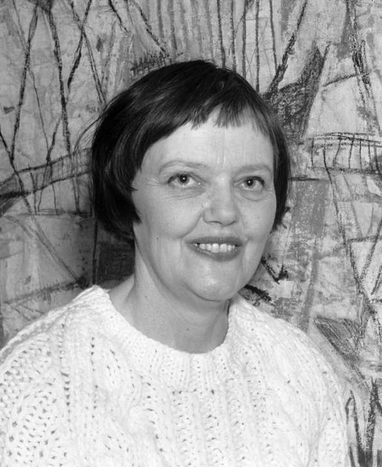
Synnøve Anker Aurdal, 1991 recipient

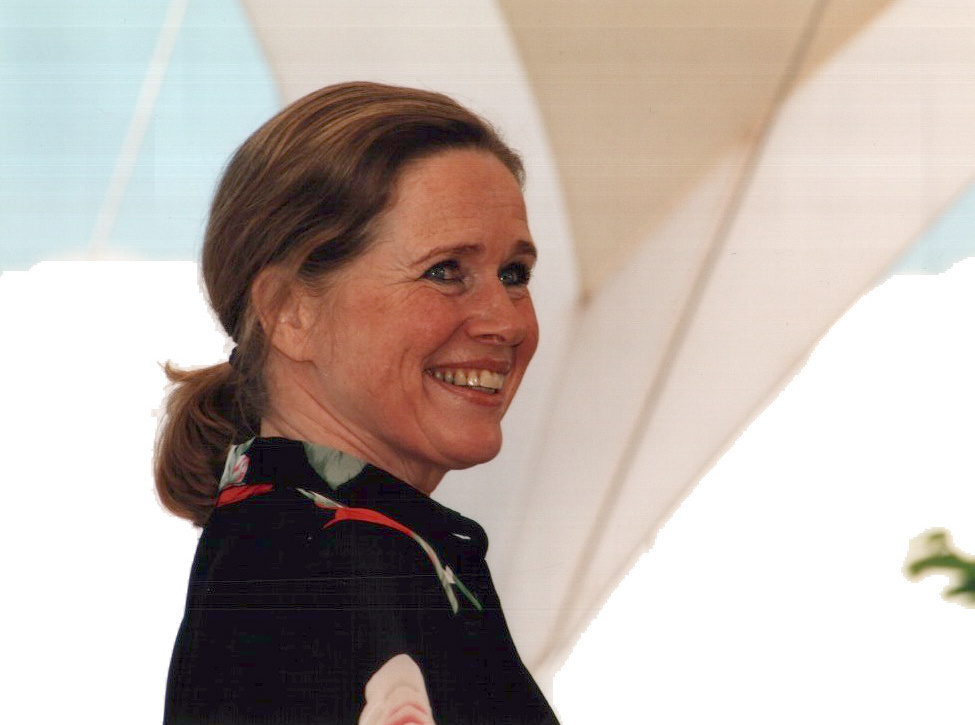
Liv Ullmann, 1997

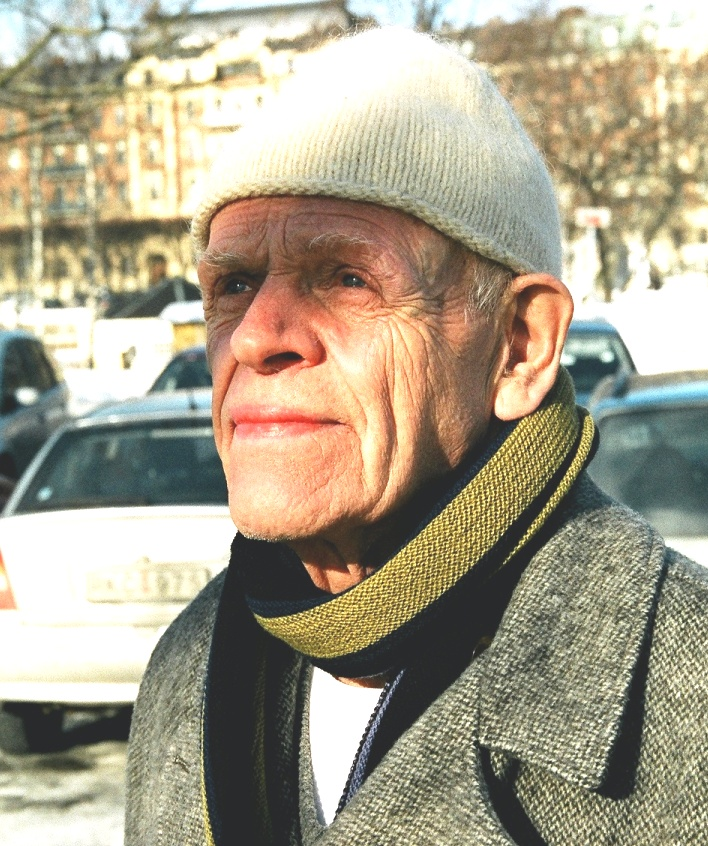
Kjartan Slettemark, 2001

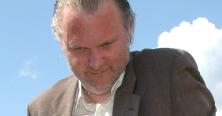
Jon Fosse, 2003

The Arts Council Norway Honorary Award (Norwegian: Norsk kulturråds ærespris) is awarded annually by the Arts Council Norway. The prize is awarded annually to a person who has made a significant contribution to Norwegian art and culture. The prize committee does not solicit nominations and the decision on award is made in closed meeting. Traditionally, no decision basis for the award is announced.

The prize is monetary (in 2005 500,000 Kroner). Since the Council's thirtieth anniversary in December 1994, a bronze lion statuette by the sculptor Elena Engelsen has also been awarded.

== Recipients ==
- 1968 – Frits von der Lippe
- 1969 – Hans Peter L'Orange, professor of archaeology
- 1970 – Alf Prøysen, writer and singer
- 1971 – Alf Rolfsen, painter
- 1972 – Klaus Egge, composer
- 1973 – Hans Heiberg, writer
- 1974 – Hans Jonas Henriksen, Sami language proponent
- 1975 – Ingeborg Refling Hagen, writer
- 1976 – Sigbjørn Bernhoft Osa, folk musician
- 1977 – Ella Hval, actor
- 1978 – Olav Dalgard, film director and critic
- 1979 – Harald Sæverud, composer
- 1980 – Sonja Hagemann
- 1981 – Erling Stordahl
- 1982 – Halldis Moren Vesaas, writer
- 1983 – Sigmund Skard, professor of literature
- 1984 – Helge Sivertsen, politician
- 1985 – Lars Brandstrup, gallerist
- 1986 – Helge Ingstad, adventurer
- 1987 – Nils Johan Rud, writer and magazine editor
- 1988 – Arne Skouen, film director
- 1989 – Espen Skjønberg, actor
- 1990 – Arne Nordheim, composer
- 1991 – Synnøve Anker Aurdal, textile artist
- 1992 – Iver Jåks, artist
- 1993 – Erik Bye, singer
- 1994 – Anne-Cath. Vestly, children's book author
- 1995 – Ole Henrik Moe, gallerist, pianist
- 1996 – Arve Tellefsen, violinist
- 1997 – Liv Ullmann, actor
- 1998 – Sverre Fehn, architect
- 1999 – Finn Carling, writer
- 2000 – Anne Brown, singer
- 2001 – Kjartan Slettemark, artist
- 2002 – Edith Roger, producer
- 2003 – Jon Fosse, writer and playwright
- 2004 – Jan Garbarek, saxophonist, composer
- 2005 – Agnes Buen Garnås, folk musician
- 2006 – Bruno Oldani, graphic designer
- 2007 – Jon Eikemo, actor
- 2008 – Solveig Kringlebotn, opera singer
- 2009 – Mari Boine, singer
- 2010 – Tor Åge Bringsværd, author
- 2011 – Inger Sitter, artist
- 2012 – Soon-Mi Chung and Stephan Barratt-Due, violinists
- 2013 – Anne Borg, dancer
- 2014 – Jan Erik Vold, poet
- 2015 – Artscape Nordland
