= Statue of Leif Erikson =

Statue of Leif Erikson may refer to

- Leif Erikson by John Karl Daniels at Leif Erikson Park, Duluth, Minnesota
- Leif Erikson: Discoverer of America
- Leif, the Discoverer by Anne Whitney
- Statue of Leif Erikson (Boston)
- Statue of Leif Erikson (Chicago)
- Statue of Leif Erikson (Newport News, Virginia)
- Statue of Leif Erikson (Reykjavík) by Alexander Stirling Calder
- Statue of Leif Erikson (Seattle)
