= List of boxing attendance records =

List of the largest attendances in the history of boxing

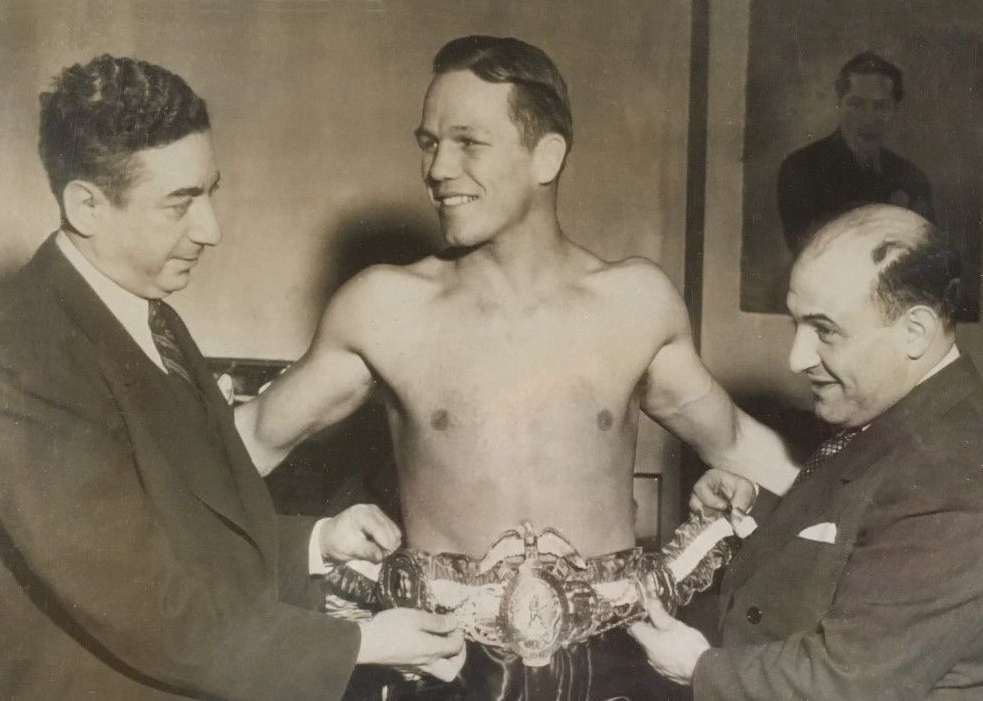
Tony Zale in 1941 set the record for the highest ever boxing attendance for his fight with Billy Pryor at Juneau Park. The event was attended by a crowd of 135,132.

The following is a list of boxing attendance records. The 1941 Middleweight bout between Tony Zale and Billy Pryor at Juneau Park in Milwaukee, Wisconsin was attended by 135,132 spectators. This remains the largest attendance in the history of combat sports.

The February 1993 bout between Julio César Chávez and Greg Haugen for the WBC super lightweight title would set the record for the highest post-war attendance with a crowd 132,274 at the Azteca Stadium to watch as Chávez would earn a dominant fifth round TKO victory.

In 1948 Max Schmeling and Walter Neusel would set the attendance record for the largest crowd outside of North America, with 102,000 spectators watching on as Schmeling came out victorious in Hamburg.

The record for the largest ever female boxing match was set in 2026 when 83,000 people were in attendance in Dublin to witness Irish boxing icon Katie Taylor compete in her final ever fight against the undefeated French sensation Flora Pili. Taylor would win and end her career as a three-time undisputed champion.

== Events and attendances ==
Note: Minimum attendance of 75,000.

No.	Headline fight	Venue	Date	Attendance	Notes
1	Tony Zale vs. Billy Pryor	Juneau Park	August 16, 1941	135,132	
2	Julio César Chávez vs. Greg Haugen	Azteca Stadium	February 20, 1993	132,274	
3	Jack Dempsey vs. Gene Tunney I	Sesquicentennial Stadium	September 23, 1926	120,757	
4	Jack Dempsey vs. Gene Tunney II	Soldier Field	September 22, 1927	104,943	
5	Max Schmeling vs. Walter Neusel	Sandbahn Lokstedt	May 23, 1948	102,000	
6	Anthony Joshua vs Daniel Dubois	Wembley Stadium	September 21, 2024	98,128	
7	Tyson Fury vs. Dillian Whyte	Wembley Stadium	April 23, 2022	94,000	
8	Len Harvey vs. Jock McAvoy	White City	April 7, 1938	90,000	
9	Anthony Joshua vs Wladimir Klitschko	Wembley Stadium	April 29, 2017	90,000	
10	Oleksandr Usyk vs. Daniel Dubois II	Wembley Stadium	July 19, 2025	90,000	
11	Katie Taylor vs. Flora Pili	Croke Park	September 5, 2026	83,000	
12	Carl Froch vs. George Groves II	Wembley Stadium	May 31, 2014	80,000	
13	Anthony Joshua vs. Alexander Povetkin	Wembley Stadium	September 22, 2018	80,000	
14	Anthony Joshua vs. Joseph Parker	Principality Stadium	March 31, 2018	75,000	
15	Anthony Joshua vs. Carlos Takam	Principality Stadium	October 28, 2017	75,000	
