= Statue of Leif Erikson (Chicago) =

Coordinates: 41°54′24″N 87°42′06″W

Leif Erikson statue
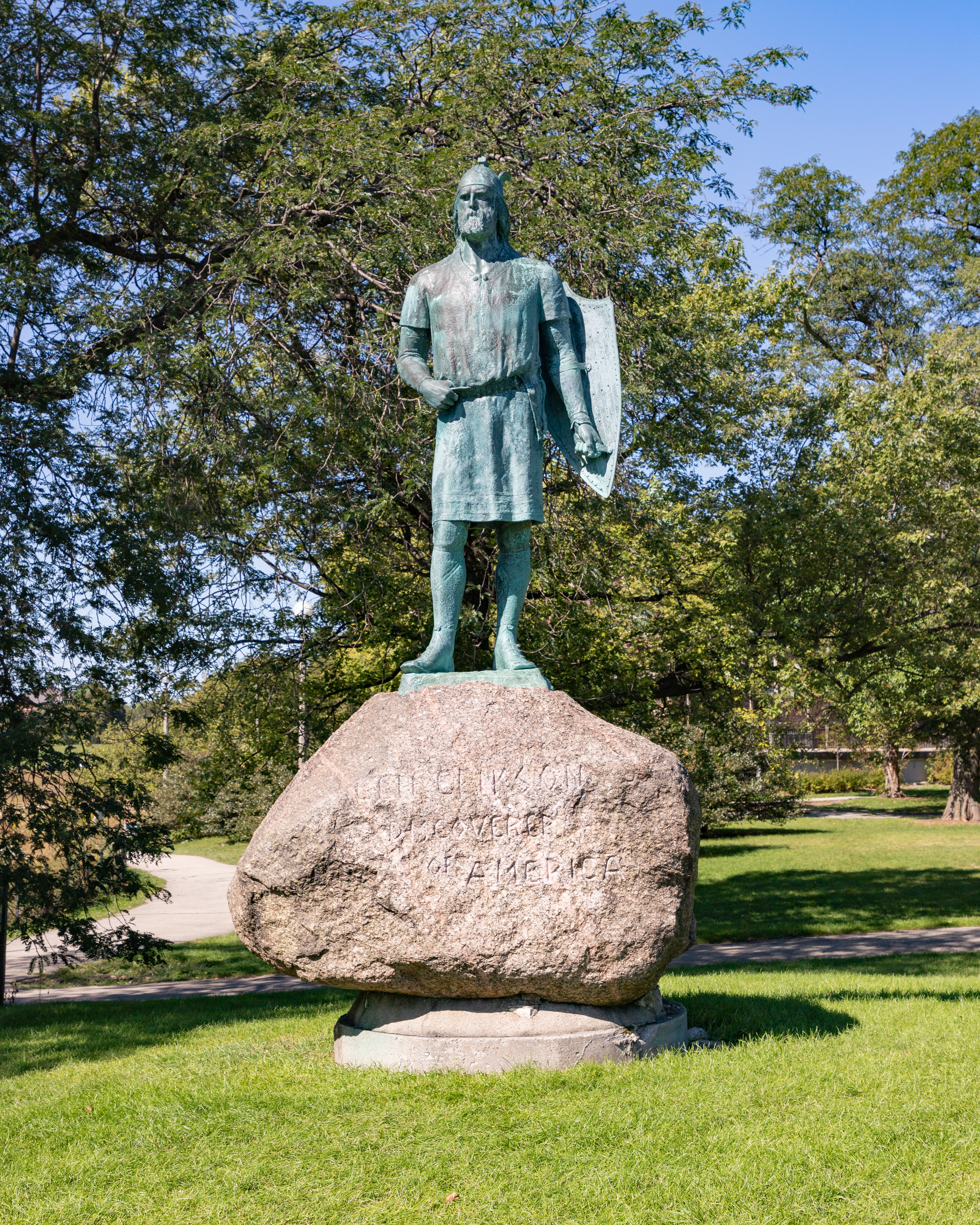
- The statue in 2020
- Interactive map of Leif Erikson statue
- Location: Humboldt Park, Chicago, Illinois, United States
- Designer: Sigvald Asbjørnsen
- Material: Bronze
- Height: 9.5 feet (2.9 m)
- Dedicated date: October 12, 1901
- Dedicated to: Leif Erikson

The Leif Erikson statue is a monumental statue honoring Leif Erikson in Chicago, Illinois, United States. Located in the city's Humboldt Park, the statue was designed by Sigvald Asbjørnsen and erected in 1901.

== History ==
Leif Erikson was a Norse explorer who is credited as being one of the first known Europeans to have set foot in continental North America. In the late 1800s, following the discovery of historical evidence supporting his explorations and further Norse colonization of North America, various monuments and memorials to Erikson began to be erected across the United States, mainly by Scandinavian American and Norwegian American communities. This was the case for the Norwegian community in Chicago's Northwest Side in the late 1800s. Prior to the city's Columbus Day celebrations in October 1892, the Norwegian community hosted a celebration in honor of Leif Erikson's discovery of North America. Writing in the Norwegian language newspaper Skandinaven, Nicolai A. Grevstad said that in the lead up to the World's Columbian Exposition, held in the city in 1893, a committee was formed for the purpose of creating a statue honoring Erikson. Plans had been made for the statue's unveiling to coincide with the arrival of a replica Viking ship from Bergen, but ultimately, construction of the sculpture would be delayed.

The statue, designed by Norwegian American sculptor Sigvald Asbjørnsen, was officially dedicated on October 12, 1901, in a celebration attended by many in the city's Norwegian community. The statue, created at a cost of $10,000, was erected in Humboldt Park.

== Design ==
The bronze statue, depicting Erikson with a shield in his left hand, is 9.5 feet (2.9 m) tall and rests on a large boulder. On the boulder is inscribed "Leif Erikson Discoverer of America."

== See also ==
- Leif, the Discoverer (Whitney)
- Statue of Leif Erikson (Boston)
- Statue of Leif Erikson (Seattle)
