= Leiv Eirikson Discovering America =

Painting by Christian Krohg

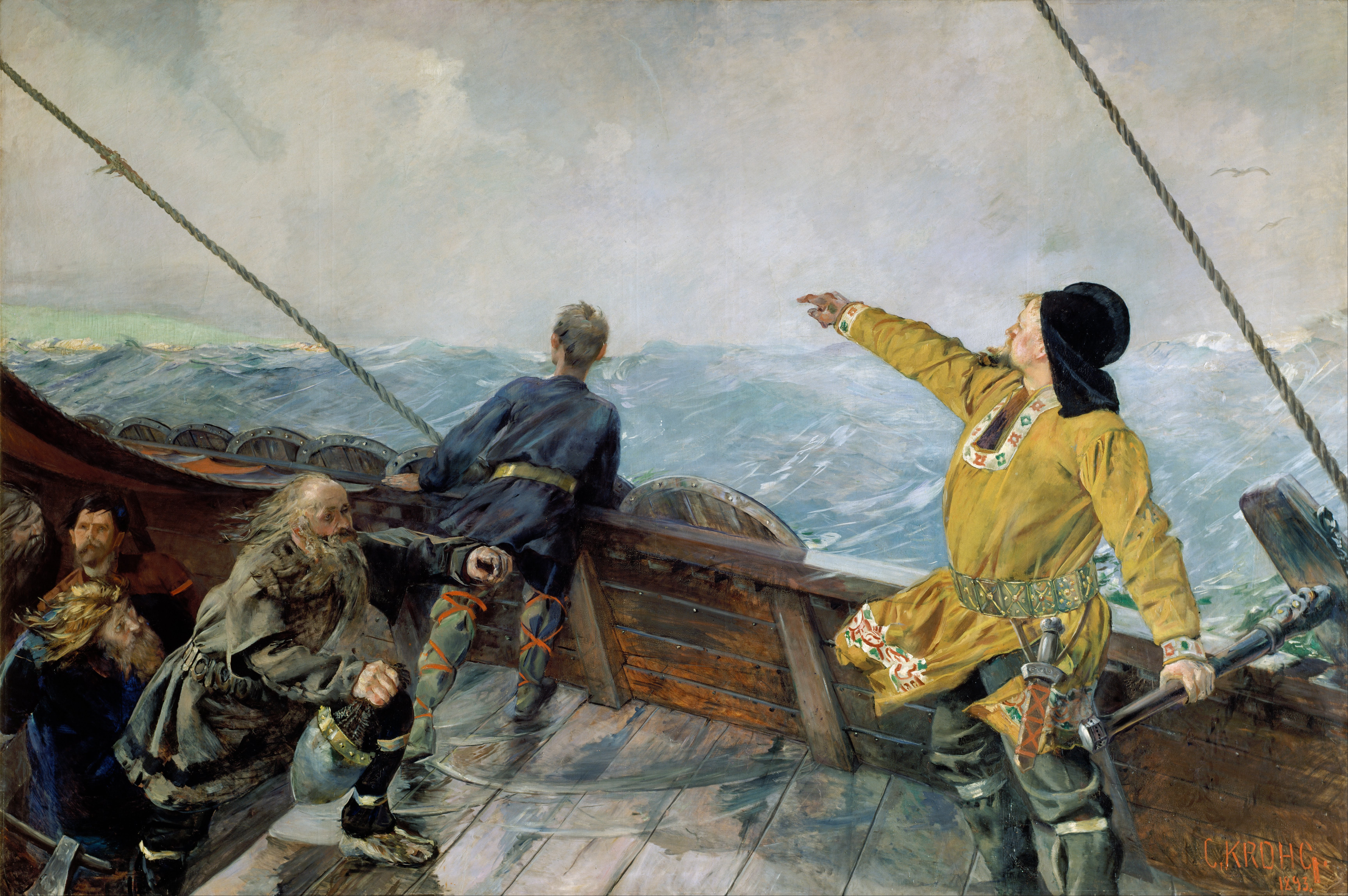
- Artist: Christian Krohg
- Year: 1893
- Medium: Oil on canvas
- Dimensions: 313 cm × 470 cm (123 in × 190 in)
- Location: National Museum of Art, Architecture and Design, Oslo

Leiv Eirikson Discovering America (Norwegian: Leiv Eirikson oppdager Amerika) is a painting by Christian Krohg. It depicts the explorer Leif Erikson, together with crewmembers onboard his ship, at the moment he discovers North American land (presumably Newfoundland), as described in the sagas of Icelanders. The painting was made for the Chicago World's Fair in 1893 and was exhibited along with the Viking ship replica Viking. It is in the collection of the National Museum of Art, Architecture and Design in Oslo. A copy of the painting, created by Krohg's son, Per Krohg, has hung in the United States Capitol since 1936.

== Background ==
Christian Krohg (1852–1925) was a Norwegian painter and novelist. He came to prominence in Norway in the 1880s as a leading naturalist and as one of the Kristiania Bohemians. Beginning with Babord litt from 1879, he made several paintings depicting sailors and maritime pilots. Leiv Eirikson Discovering America can be counted to this group. It was commissioned in 1891 by the Leif Erikson Memorial Association in Chicago, an organisation set up by Norwegian Americans, which invited Krohg and other painters to a contest where they would paint Leif Erikson's discovery of America, as described in the medieval sagas of Icelanders. The winning painting would be exhibited at the World's Columbian Exposition—the Chicago World's Fair of 1893. Krohg's painting won and was sent to Chicago.

== Subject and composition ==
Leiv Eirikson Discovering America is painted in oil on canvas with the dimensions 313 cm × 470 cm (123 in × 185 in). The painting presents a view from the deck of Leif Erikson's ship, looking out over the waves with land visible in the distance to the left. To the right in the picture is the title figure, holding the rudder and wearing a mustard-coloured tunic. He stands straight and points toward the land in the horizon. A few other men on deck are hunching and look seasick.

== Analysis and reception ==
The role Leiv Eirikson Discovering America played in American society has been associated with Scandinavian immigration, as the stories of pre-Columbian Nordic voyages to North America formed a part of Scandinavian American assimilation into American nationhood. In the late 19th and early 20th centuries, this narrative of identity caused some conflict with Italian Americans, as the discovery of America by Christopher Columbus had a similar role in their assimilation process. Leiv Eirikson Discovering America was featured at the Chicago World's Fair along with the ship Viking, a replica of the Viking Age Gokstad ship, which sailed from Norway to the United States and anchored at Chicago's Jackson Park in time for the event. Much literature associated with the world's fair, including official programs, incorrectly identified both Viking and the ship in Krohg's painting as exact replicas of the ship Leif Erikson had sailed across the Atlantic. The large painting became a popular attraction for those who had missed Viking's arrival or wanted to relive it.

Analyzing the painting in 2019, historian Eleanor Rosamund Barraclough says Leif "radiates strength and leadership" and is depicted with a purposefulness which contrasts with the other men in the image. The historian Johnni Langer places Leiv Eirikson Discovering America in the same European tradition of depicting Viking voyages as Oscar Wergeland's The Norwegians Land in Iceland Year 872 (1877), and contrasts it with Arrival of the Viking in America (1845) by the German American Emanuel Leutze. This European tradition is distinguished from the American by avoiding humorous features.

== Provenance ==
Leiv Eirikson Discovering America won the Leif Erikson Memorial Association's contest and was part of the Chicago World's Fair. The world's fair also featured two paintings by Krohg's wife Oda Krohg. The first years after the world's fair, Leiv Eirikson Discovering America was without a permanent home. In 1900, the Leif Erikson Memorial Association gifted it to the National Gallery in Oslo, now part of Norway's National Museum of Art, Architecture and Design.

The catalogue for Norway's exhibition at the Chicago World's Fair lists the painting's name as Leif Erikson Discovering America. The National Museum of Art, Architecture and Design uses the name Leiv Eirikson Discovering America.

== Norwegian exhibitions ==
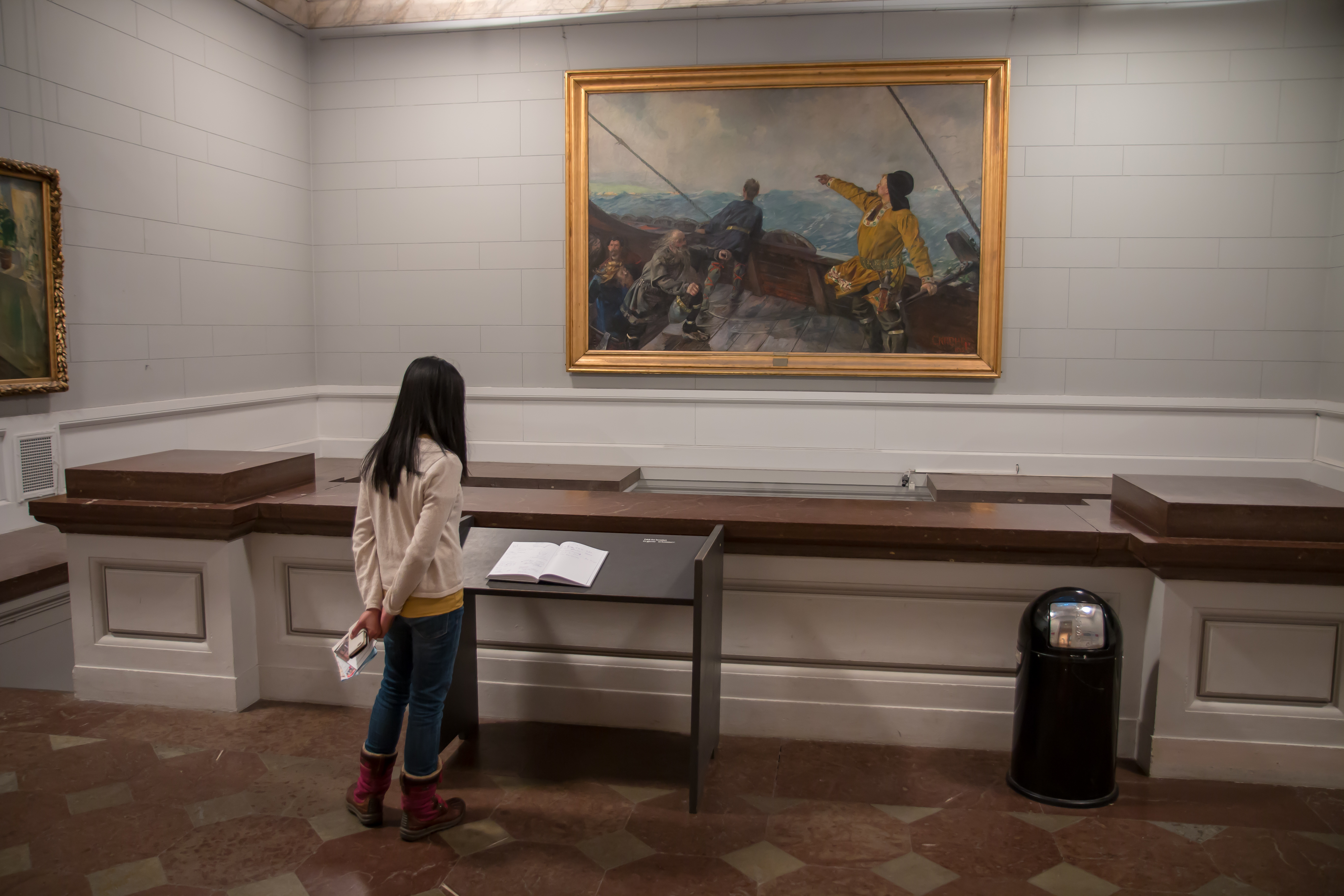
Former placement at the National Gallery (2018)

Temporary four-week placement at the National Museum (2023)

Following its donation, the painting was displayed at various times in both the National Gallery (where it often was prominently hung above the stairwell) and the Norwegian Maritime Museum.

In January 2019, the National Gallery was closed to allow its collection to be moved to the National Museum's new building, which opened in June 2022. Upon its opening, a decision had been made to not display the painting in the new museum, but rather to place it in storage. Following media reports in February 2023, the decision to not exhibit the painting, and the justification given by museum staff, caused controversy in Norway.

Stina Högkvist, the department director at the National Museum explained the situation to the Aftenposten newspaper, saying; "The picture is a romanticization of Norwegians who went to America. It is a colonialist image" and further added "We are now showing more female artists, more Sámi artists and more art by people whom were not born with white skin. We shall continue with this. We must have a socially relevant, fresh look at the history of art."

Criticism was swift from politicians, art historians, and the general public. Eivor Evenrud, from Oslo City Council's Culture and Education Committee, called the decision "completely absurd." In response to the criticism, Stina Högkvist apologized and clarified, stating that her remark was sloppy and poorly thought out, and that she didn't actually believe that the painting was colonialist. Following the controversy, the National Museum temporarily displayed the painting on the new museum's main floor for four weeks.

== Copy at the United States Capitol ==
During the 74th Congress, Senator Alben W. Barkley introduced Senate Joint Resolution 165 which directed the Architect of the Capitol to accept a copy of the painting to be displayed within the United States Capitol. After Congress passed the legislation, it was signed by President Franklin D. Roosevelt on 18 March 1936. On 23 March 1936, during a ceremony held in National Statuary Hall, the copy was presented as a gift by the Norwegian Friends of America. Titled Leiv Eiriksson Discovers America A.D. 1000, the copy was painted by Krohg's son, Per Krohg. The artwork hangs in the Capitol's Senate wing, next to the Senators' Gallery door on the building's third floor.
