= Leif, the Discoverer (Whitney) =

Sculpture by Anne Whitney

- Artist: Anne Whitney
- Year: 1887
- Type: Public Art, Sculpture (bronze, red sandstone)
- Dimensions: 240 cm (96 in)
- Location: Milwaukee, Wisconsin, U.S.; 43°2′39.258″N 87°53′50.911″W

Leif, the Discoverer is a bronze sculpture of Leif Ericson created by American sculptor Anne Whitney. The statue was erected on November 15, 1887 in Juneau Park in Milwaukee, Wisconsin, United States.

== Description ==
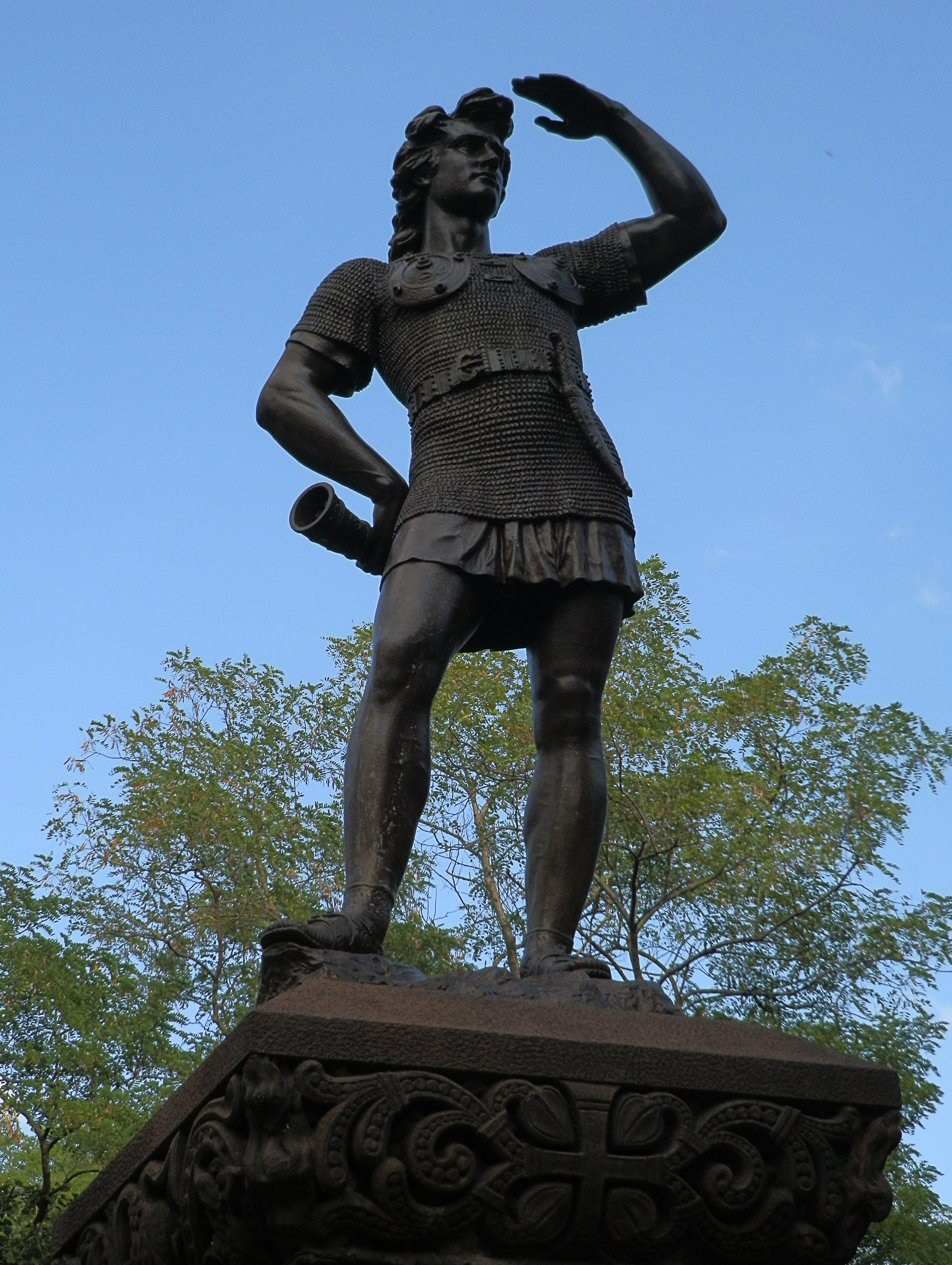
The bronze figure

The figure is approximately 8 feet tall; the upper base is approximately 110 x 84 x 84 inches; the lower base is approximately 12 × 9 x 96 inches. The sculpture is bronze; the base is red sandstone.

Shading his eyes to scan the distance, Leif Ericson stands on a large red sandstone pedestal. Unlike other depictions of Ericson, here he is youthful and clean-shaven. He wears a scale armor shirt, ornamented with breast plates and a studded belt. Underneath, he wears a tunic and leggings with leather sandals. He carries a powder horn over his shoulder and a knife in a decorative sheath at his side. On the sandstone base, the inscription reads, Leif, the discoverer/ son of Erik/ who sailed from Iceland/ and landed on this continent/ A.D. 1000. In runic letters, it also reads, Leif, son of Erik the Red.

Short video of Leif, the Discoverer sculpture.

== History ==
The first casting of the statue resides in Boston, Massachusetts on Commonwealth Avenue. In November 1887, the Milwaukee copy was erected; however, at the request of its donor, Mrs. Joseph T. Gilbert, there was no dedication ceremony.

By the 1990s, evidence of structural instability, manifest through cracks, erosion, and the deterioration of caulking in the pedestal was observable. In February 1995, the statue was moved 20 feet to the west to prevent it falling off the bluff. Additionally, in September of that year, the statue was cleaned and covered in acrylic resin. During the cleaning, residue of gold size was found, indicating the statue may have originally been gilded. The recently moved and restored statue was dedicated on May 17, 1996, Norway's annual Constitution Day celebration.

In October 2001, the Sons of Norway Fosselyngen Lodge held a ceremony to celebrate the recent addition of a lighting system for the statue, which cost $3,800 (equivalent to $6,909 in 2025). The funds were bequested by the late lodge member, Duane Olson. The addition was a joint effort between the Fosselyngen Lodge, Milwaukee County and the city of Milwaukee. This lighting system was replaced, and the statue again professionally cleaned, during a project by Juneau Park Friends in 2017.

== See also ==
- Statue of Leif Erikson (Boston)
- Statue of Leif Erikson (Chicago)
- Statue of Leif Erikson (Seattle)
