= Jelena Janićijević =

Serbian boxer (born 1985)

Personal information
- Born: 7 March 1985 (age 41) Belgrade, Serbia
- Weight: Lightweight, Light-welterweight, Welterweight

Boxing career
- Stance: Orthodox

Boxing record
- Total fights: 11
- Wins: 6
- Win by KO: 2
- Losses: 3
- Draws: 1
- No contests: 1
Medal record
Women's amateur boxing
Representing Serbia
European Championships
Bronze medal – third place	2022 Budva	Welterweight

Jelena Janićijević (Serbian Cyrillic: Јелена Јанићијевић, born 7 March 1985) is a Serbian professional boxer. She has held the European female lightweight and WBO European female super-lightweight titles. Janićijević became the first female boxer from Serbia to win a senior medal at an International Boxing Association sanctioned competition when she claimed bronze at the 2022 Women's European Amateur Boxing Championships.

== Career ==
A former kickboxer, Janićijević switched to boxing in 2015. She lost on her professional debut suffering a points decision defeat to Nahed Kharchi in a six-round contest in Drap, France, on 29 September 2018.

Three victories and a no contest followed before, on 24 September 2021, Janićijević fought Oleksandra Sidorenko for the vacant European female lightweight title with the contest in Oborniki, Poland, ending in a draw. A rematch was held on 5 March 2022 in Dzierżoniów, Poland, with Janićijević winning the bout, and the title, by split decision. Two judges scored 96-94 and 97-93 respectively for Janićijević and the third gave the contest 96-94 for Sidorenko.

Taking advantage of a change in rules that allowed professionals to take part in previously amateur-only competitions, Janićijević competed at the 2022 IBA Women's World Boxing Championships in Istanbul, Turkey in May 2022, going out in the light-welterweight quarter-finals to the eventual gold medalist, Ireland's Amy Broadhurst.

In October 2022, she won the first ever senior medal for a Serbian female boxer at an International Boxing Association sanctioned event when she took bronze at the 2022 Women's European Amateur Boxing Championships in Budva, Montenegro. Competing in the welterweight category, she beat Shahla Allahverdiyeva from Azerbaijan by third-round stoppage in the quarter-finals before losing to Germany's Stefanie Von Berge in the final four. Just as had been the case at the world championship, her conqueror went on to win the gold medal.

Janićijević defeated Sarah Weidmann by unanimous decision to claim the vacant WBO European female super-lightweight title in Zlatibor, Serbia, on 5 January 2023.

Two months later, at the 2023 IBA Women's World Boxing Championships in New Delhi, India, she lost in the light-welterweight category round of 16.

Janićijević looked set to get an opportunity to become a professional world champion when the IBF ordered negotiations to take place between her and Brazil's Beatriz Ferreira to fight for the female lightweight title vacated by Katie Taylor. However, she was removed from the IBF's rating for undisclosed reasons after terms for the contest were not agreed before the negotiation period expired.

She faced Flora Pili for the vacant IBO female super-lightweight title at L'Agora Champ de Foire in Saint-Avold, France, on 5 December 2025. Janićijević lost via majority decision with the judges' scorecards reading 95-95, 92-98 and 93-97.

== Personal life ==
Janićijević has a PhD in English literature and is a taekwondo black belt.

== Professional boxing record ==
11 fights	6 wins	3 losses
By knockout	2	0
By decision	4	3
Draws	1	
No contests	1	

No.	Result	Record	Opponent	Type	Round, time	Date	Location	Notes
11	Loss	6–3–1(1)	Biancamaria Tessari	UD	10	6 June 2026	PalaDozza, Bologna, Italy	
10	Loss	6–2–1(1)	Flora Pili	MD	10	5 December 2025	L'Agora Champ de Foire, Saint-Avold, France	For vacant IBO female super-lightweight title
9	Win	6–1–1(1)	Antonina Cuti	PTS	6	21 December 2024	Carini, Sicily, Italy	
8	Win	5–1–1(1)	Sarah Weidmann	UD	10	5 January 2023	Zlatibor, Serbia	Won vacant WBO European female super-lightweight title
7	Win	4–1–1(1)	Oleksandra Sidorenko	SD	10	5 March 2022	Hala Osrodka Sportu, Dzierżoniów, Poland	Won vacant European Boxing Union female lightweight title
6	Draw	3–1–1(1)	Oleksandra Sidorenko	SD	10	24 September 2021	Hala Sportowa, Oborniki, Poland	For vacant European female lightweight title
5	Win	3–1(1)	Karina Szmalenberg	UD	6	9 August 2020	Eisstadion, Braunlage, Germany	
4	Win	2–1(1)	Joanna Ekedahl	KO	5 (6), 1:00	22 June 2019	Forum, Horsens, Denmark	
3	NC	1–1(1)	Licia Boudersa	NC	5 (6)	23 February 2019	Palais des Sports Saint-Sauveur, Lille, France	Injury. Originally Janicijevic win by TKO. Changed to no contest on 17 December 2020
2	Win	1–1	Donya Darouiche	KO	3 (4)	3 November 2018	Complexe de la Busserine, Marseille, France	
1	Loss	0–1	Nahed Kharchi	PTS	6	29 September 2018	Espace Jean Ferrat, Drap, France	
