= Statue of Leif Erikson (Boston) =

Statue in Boston, Massachusetts, U.S.

Leif Eriksson
- The statue from the west in 2019
- Artist: Anne Whitney
- Year: 1885
- Medium: Bronze sculpture
- Subject: Leif Erikson
- Location: Boston, Massachusetts, U.S.; 42°20′57″N 71°05′29″W

Leif Eriksson is an outdoor statue by Anne Whitney at the west end of the Commonwealth Avenue Mall in Boston, Massachusetts, United States. Installed in 1887, it was the first public sculpture to honor the Norse explorer in the New World.

== Description ==
The bronze is 102 in (260 cm) tall and stands on a red sandstone pedestal 108 in (270 cm) high, with a small stonework boat at the base. The granite around the sculpture originally served as a fountain, but has since been converted to a flower bed. The work contains runes as well as the English inscription "Leif the Discoverer, Son of Erik, who sailed from Iceland and landed on this continent, AD 1000." It depicts Leif as a young man lifting his left hand in front of his brow. In a letter to the Boston Art Commission, the sculptor described the posture as a "man of the old world shading his vision against the glare of the new."

== History ==
The memorial was commissioned by the baking powder magnate Eben Norton Horsford, prompted by conversations with Ole Bull and others, to promote the idea of Norse exploration of North America. Its dedication on October 29, 1887 included a big parade through Boston Common to Faneuil Hall, where Governor Oliver Ames and other dignitaries spoke.

Whitney corresponded with Frederick Law Olmsted about the placement of the monument and its landscaping. The monument was moved, soon after November 1917, to allow for the realignment of Commonwealth Avenue. The site was surveyed as part of the Smithsonian Institution's "Save Outdoor Sculpture!" program in 1993. Corrosion was treated in 2007 and an acrylic protective coating was applied.

== Copies ==
Late in 1887, a copy, Leif, the Discoverer by Anne Whitney, was placed in Juneau Park in Milwaukee, Wisconsin.

Bertha Palmer requested the plaster cast of the statue for the 1893 World's Columbian Exposition. This was bronzed and displayed there, then later at the Smithsonian Institution, until it was placed in storage. Eventually the bronzed plaster was incorporated into the collection of the National Museum of Women in the Arts.

== See also ==
- 1885 in art
- Statue of Leif Erikson (Chicago)
- Statue of Leif Erikson (Seattle)
- Viking expansion
