= Nordic immigration to North America =

Map of the Nordic region

Nordic immigration to North America relates to the movement of people from the Nordic countries of Sweden, Denmark, Norway, Iceland, and Finland to North America, mainly the United States and Canada, from the 17th to the 20th centuries. Immigrants were drawn to the New World for several reasons, including economic opportunities and religious freedom.

The most significant wave of Nordic immigration to the U.S was between 1820 and 1920. Sweden was the largest source of immigrants (1,144,607), followed by Norway (693,450), and Denmark (300,008).

== Historical overview ==
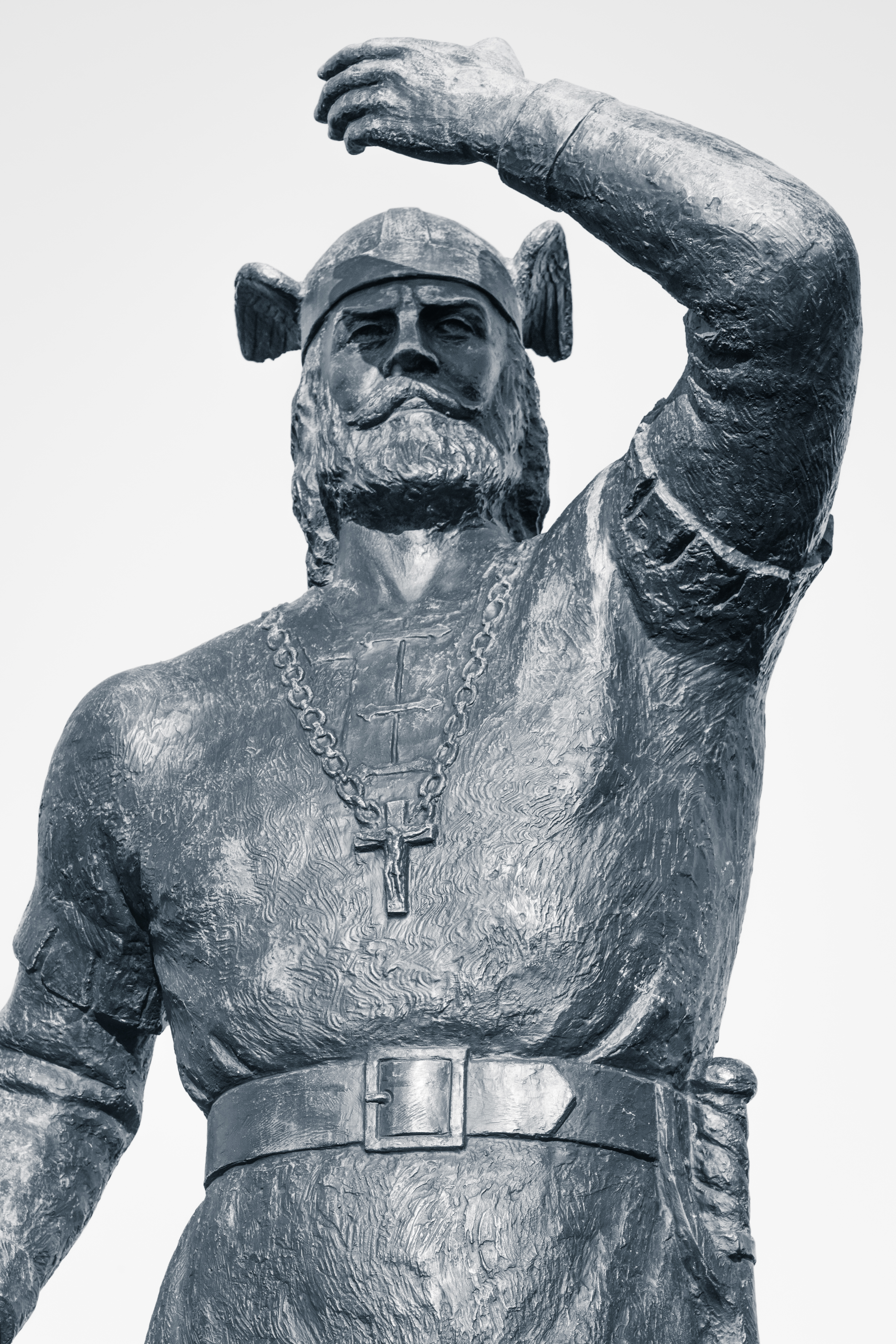
Statue of Leif Erikson in Minnesota

Around AD 1000, the Norwegian explorer Leif Erikson reached the shores of what would become known as New England. He established Vinland, a settlement which some believe to have been located in today's Newfoundland.

Large scale Nordic migration came in 19th and early 20th centuries. Some sought religious freedom, escaping oppressive state churches. Migrants were drawn to fertile farmland found in the American Midwest.

== Sweden ==
From 1840 to 1930, over 1.3 million Swedes migrated to America, with the largest influx between 1920 and 1930 (~92,000). Predominantly, they chose to settle in the Midwest, especially around the Great Lakes, while a smaller number went to Canada or Cuba.

Though Swedish Americans assimilated well into the broader American culture, they also established strong religious and social institutions. For example by 1855, there were Swedish American newspapers such as Hemlandet circulating across Illinois and Minnesota. Many Swedish immigrants became agriculturalists, factory or furniture laborers.

Population of Swedish origin in the United States (1900–1940)
Year	Swedish born	Born in America to one or both Swedish born parents	Total
1900	581,986	542,032	1,124,018
1910	665,183	752,695	1,417,878
1920	625,580	888,497	1,514,077
1930	595,250	967,453	1,562,703
1940	445,070	856,320	1,301,390

=== New Sweden in Delaware ===
As early as the 1600s, Swedish settlers led by Peter Minuit began colonization efforts in the Delaware River region. They established the colonies of New Sweden and Fort Kristina in 1638. However, these efforts were fraught with challenges, including ship malfunctions and tensions with English and Dutch settlers. The Dutch erected Fort Casimir near Fort Kristina and eventually conquered New Sweden in 1655.

Swedish settlers built a rapport with local Native American tribes, primarily through trade, which became crucial for their sustenance.

=== Swedish immigration to Minnesota ===
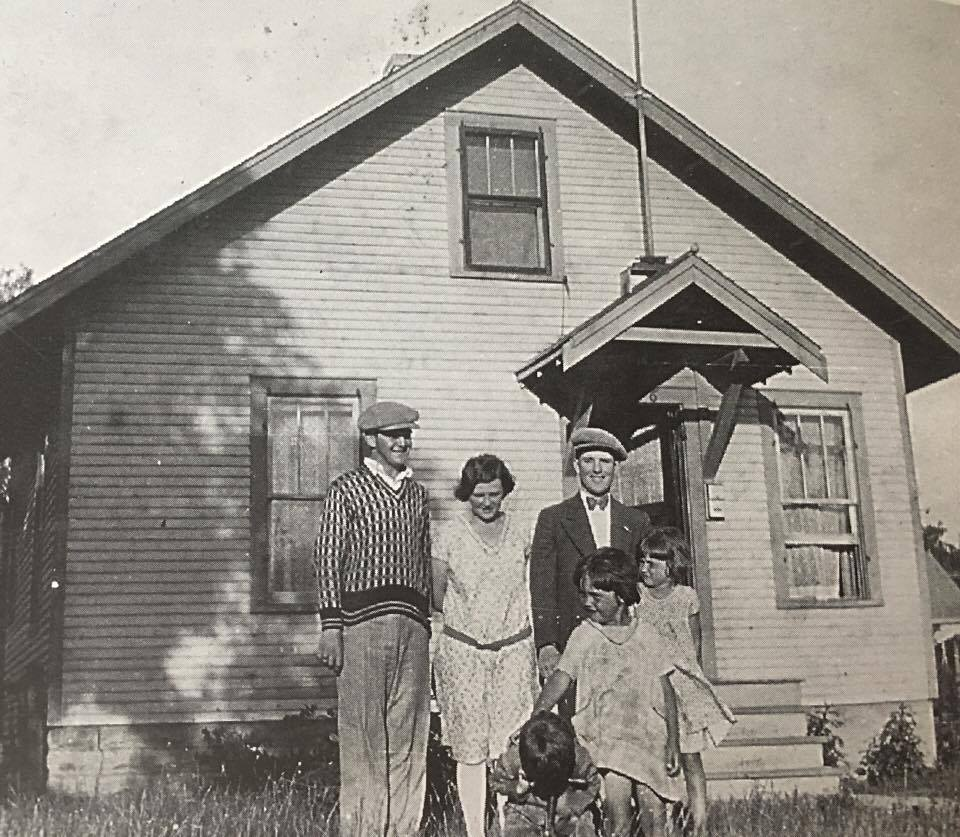
A Swedish family stands in front of their home in Minneapolis

The first Swedes recorded in the Minnesota Territory appeared in the 1850 United States Census. By April 1851, the first permanent Swedish settlement was established in the Chisago Lakes region of Chisago County. Pioneers like Erik Ulrick Norberg and Johan Oscar Roos were among the first to settle in this region. Driven by tales of opportunity and letters from relatives and friends already settled in the area, the Swedish population around Chisago Lake grew rapidly.

Lutheran churches, in particular, became central hubs of the Swedish-American community.

=== Swedish immigration to Cuba ===
After the Spanish-American War, Cuba's fertile lands and year-round farming potential attracted many Swedes seeking opportunities abroad. Dr. Alfred Lind was a pioneering figure in this movement, actively promoting Cuban settlements to Swedish immigrants in the United States, particularly those from Minnesota. Following his lead, several Swedish communities, including the notable Bayate settlement, sprouted across Cuba.

Many of these immigrants mastered three languages: their native Swedish, English from their time in the United States, and Spanish to engage with the Cuban populace. Additionally, they integrated into the Cuban economy, often employing local Cubans in their agricultural endeavors. However, political upheavals around 1917 led to the decline of these settlements, and the Swedish presence in Cuba has now largely faded.

=== Influences ===
Swedish-Americans have influenced America's coffee culture. While substitutes for coffee were common in Sweden at the time due to scarcity, access to quality coffee beans in America increasing the coffee drinking habits of Swedish Americans and popularized the custom of pairing coffee with treats.

Gustavus Adolphus College in St. Peter, Minnesota, was founded by Swedish immigrant Reverend Eric Norelius in 1862. The institution has achieved national recognition, ranking as the 89th top liberal arts college in the US by 2020.

== Norway ==
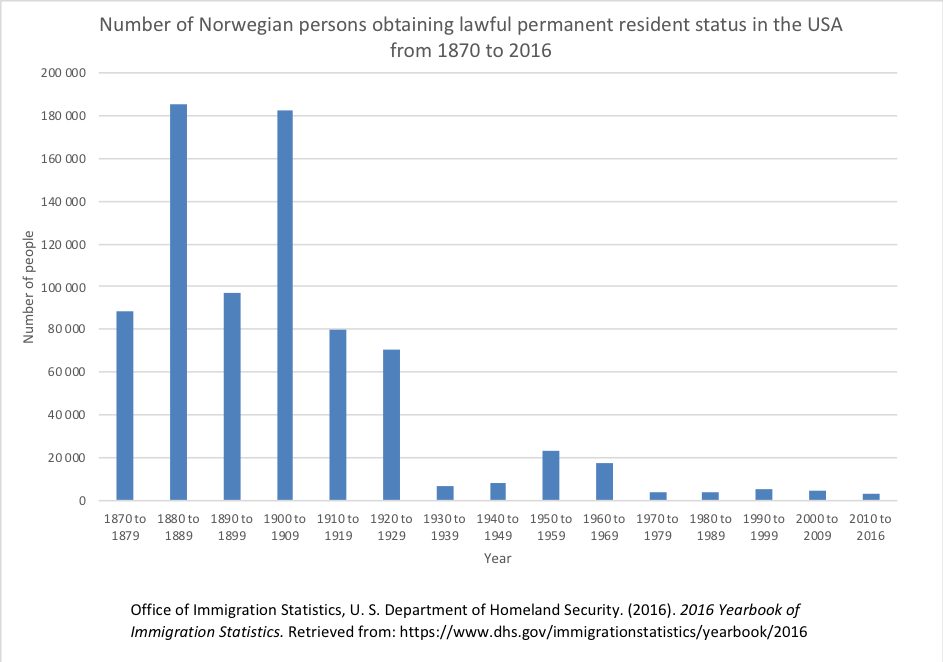
Trends in Norwegian immigration to the United States

Norwegian immigration to North America began in earnest in the mid-19th century, driven by a combination of economic, social, and political factors in Norway. Between 1825 and 1925, more than 800,000 Norwegians emigrated to the United States and Canada.

Most Norwegian immigrants who immigrated to the US settled in the Midwest, especially in the states of Minnesota, Wisconsin, and North Dakota. They were drawn to these areas due to the familiar landscape and climate, as well as the availability of farmland.

Canada's aggressive campaign in Europe, promoting the availability of free land for settlers under the Dominion Lands Act of 1872 also attracted some.

== Iceland ==
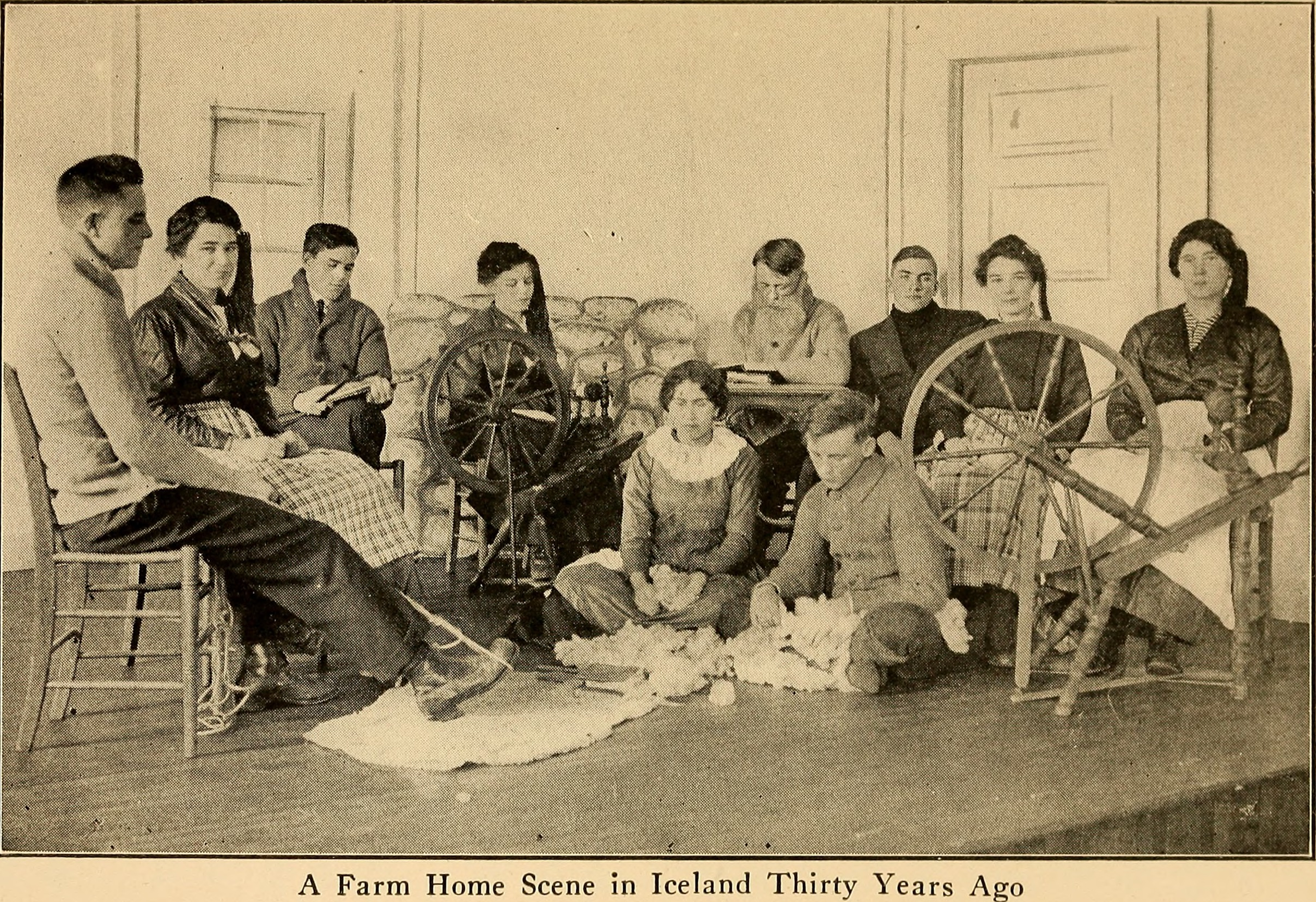
Young men and women of Icelandic descent in North Dakota

Icelandic immigration to North America began in the latter half of the 19th century and continued into the early 20th century. Most settled in Canada.

The Interlake Region of Manitoba became the primary destination for Icelandic immigrants to Canada. New Iceland, an area on the western shore of Lake Winnipeg, was established in 1875. The town of Gimli is the most famous Icelandic settlement in Canada and is still home to a large Icelandic-Canadian community. The Icelandic Festival of Manitoba is held annually in Gimli.

For those who immigrated to the US, North Dakota became a popular destination for Icelanders. The city of Pembina, North Dakota, is often credited as the starting point for Icelandic immigration to the U.S.

== Danish Realm ==
Fewer Danes immigrated to the US compared to Swedes or Norwegians. Utah has the highest proportion of residents with Danish ancestry as of 2020, some of whom are descendants of the some 17,000 Latter-day Saints who arrived in 1847.

A few Faroese headed to New England and the Pacific Northwest during the late 19th and early 20th centuries.

As of 2000, there are about 350 people reporting Greenlandic ancestry.

== Sápmi ==
The Sámi are the indigenous people of the Sápmi region. Approximately 30,000 people of Sámi ancestry live in North America.
