= Miriam Gutiérrez =

Spanish boxer (born 1983)

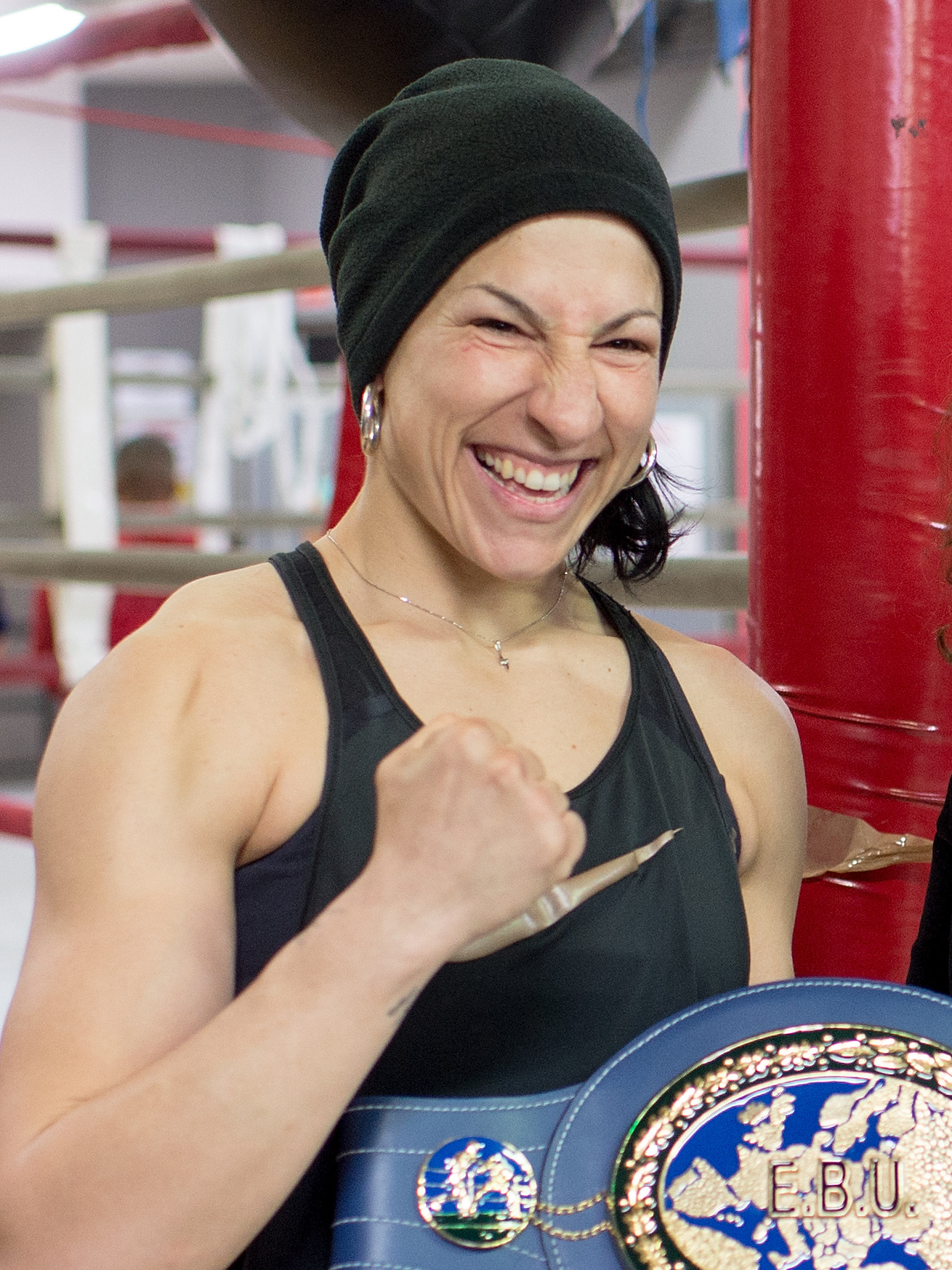
- Gutiérrez in 2019

Personal information
- Nickname: La Reina
- Nationality: Spanish
- Born: 21 February 1983 (age 43) Madrid, Comunidad de Madrid, Spain
- Height: 171 cm (5 ft 7 in)
- Weight: Lightweight

Boxing career
- Stance: Orthodox

Boxing record
- Total fights: 17
- Wins: 15
- Win by KO: 5
- Losses: 2

Miriam Gutiérrez Parra (born 21 February 1983) is a Spanish former professional boxer who held the WBA interim female lightweight World title and the European female lightweight title.

== Professional career ==
Gutiérrez made her professional debut on 31 March 2017, scoring a five-round unanimous decision victory over Vanesa Caballero at the Casino Gran Madrid in Torrelodones, Spain.

She won the vacant European female lightweight title on 22 March 2019, defeating Sam Smith by unanimous decision at the same venue in which she had made her debut.

Gutiérrez claimed the vacant WBA interim female lightweight World title with a unanimous decision victory over Keren Batiz on 29 November 2019. Once again the bout took place at Casino Gran Madrid in Torrelodones.

In her next fight, Gutiérrez challenged undisputed lightweight World champion Katie Taylor at Wembley Arena in London, England, on 14 November 2020. She was knocked down in the fourth-round but managed to go the distance ultimately losing by unanimous decision.

Gutiérrez retired from professional boxing in May 2023.

== Professional boxing record ==
17 fights	15 wins	2 losses
By knockout	5	0
By decision	10	2

No.	Result	Record	Opponent	Type	Round, time	Date	Location	Notes
17	Win	15–2	(Spain) Patricia Martin Cabrera	MD	8	19 May 2023	Casino Gran Madrid, Torrelodones, Spain	
16	Loss	14–2	(Puerto Rico) Amanda Serrano	UD	10	Dec 18, 2021	(United States) Amalie Arena, Tampa, Florida, U.S.	
15	Win	14–1	(Montenegro) Aleksandra Ivanovic	TKO	6 (10)	6 Nov 2021	Pabellón Municipal José Antonio Paraíso, Torrejón de Ardoz, Spain	
14	Loss	13–1	(Republic of Ireland) Katie Taylor	UD	10	14 Nov 2020	(United Kingdom) The SSE Arena, London, England	For WBA, WBC, IBF, WBO, and The Ring female lightweight titles
13	Win	13–0	(Venezuela) Keren Batiz	UD	10	29 Nov 2019	Casino Gran Madrid, Torrelodones, Spain	Won vacant WBA interim female lightweight title
12	Win	12–0	(Hungary) Bianka Majlath	TKO	2 (10)	5 Jul 2019	Casino Gran Madrid, Torrelodones, Spain	
11	Win	11–0	(Hungary) Bianka Nagy	UD	8	13 Apr 2019	Hotel Barceló Santa, Barcelona, Spain	
10	Win	10–0	(United Kingdom) Sam Smith	UD	10	22 Mar 2019	Casino Gran Madrid, Torrelodones, Spain	Won vacant European female lightweight title
9	Win	9–0	(Hungary) Kamila Boka	KO	3 (8)	11 Feb 2019	Teatro Nuevo Apolo, Madrid, Spain	
8	Win	8–0	(Georgia (country)) Mariam Tatunashvili	UD	6	16 Nov 2018	Casino Gran Madrid, Torrelodones, Spain	
7	Win	7–0	(Georgia (country)) Mariam Tatunashvili	PTS	6	23 Jun 2018	Hotel Novotel Madrid Centre, Madrid, Spain	
6	Win	6–0	(Montenegro) Aleksandra Vujovic	UD	6	2 Jun 2018	Expocoruna, A Coruña, Spain	
5	Win	5–0	(Serbia) Ksenija Medic	TKO	1 (6)	16 Mar 2018	Casino Gran Madrid, Torrelodones, Spain	
4	Win	4–0	(Serbia) Valentina Stankovic	TKO	3 (6)	3 Nov 2017	Casino Gran Madrid, Torrelodones, Spain	
3	Win	3–0	(Montenegro) Aleksandra Vujovic	UD	6	22 Sep 2017	Polideportivo Jose Caballero, Alcobendas, Spain	
2	Win	2–0	(Romania) Mirabela Calugareanu	TKO	2 (4)	1 Sep 2017	(Spain) Centro Hípico Xanadú, Arona, Tenerife	
1	Win	1–0	(Spain) Vanesa Caballero	UD	5	31 Mar 2017	Casino Gran Madrid, Torrelodones, Spain	

Sporting positions
Regional boxing titles
Vacant Title last held by Oleksandra Sidorenko	European female lightweight champion 22 March 2019 – July 2019	Vacant
World boxing titles
New title	WBA female lightweight champion Gold title 5 July 2019 – 29 November 2019; Won interim title	Vacant
Vacant Title last held by Laura Tavecchio	WBA female lightweight champion Interim title 29 November 2019 – 14 November 2020; Fought for full title	Vacant
