= Oleksandra Sidorenko =

Polish boxer

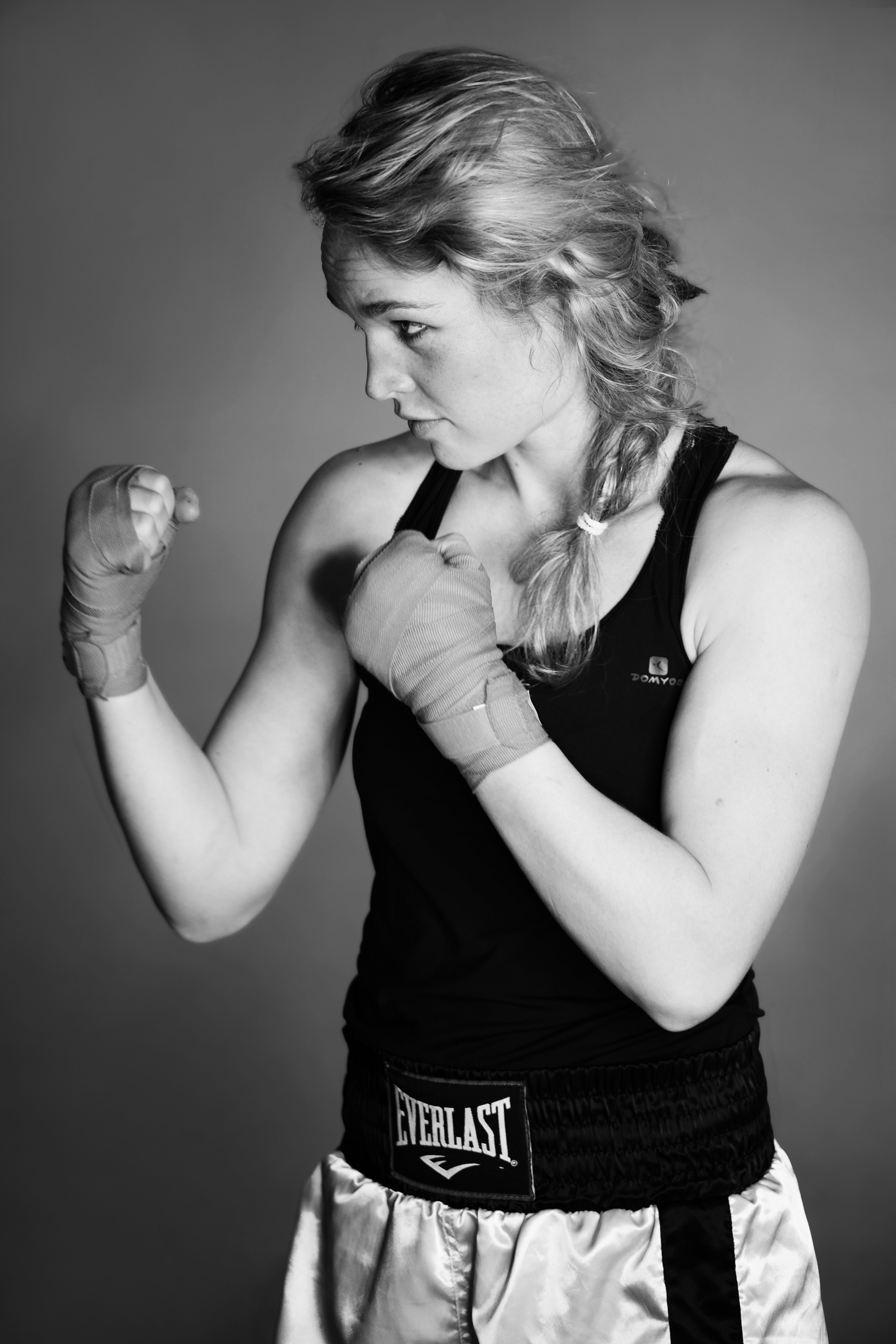

Personal information
- Nationality: Ukrainian; Polish
- Born: Vinnytsia, Ukraine
- Height: 174 cm (5 ft 9 in)
- Weight: Lightweight

Boxing career
- Reach: 170 cm (67 in)
- Stance: Orthodox

Boxing record
- Total fights: 12
- Wins: 10
- Win by KO: 1
- Losses: 1
- Draws: 1

Oleksandra "Sasha" Sidorenko is a Ukrainian-born Polish professional boxer who held the European female lightweight title in 2017.

== Professional career ==
Sidorenko made her professional debut on 18 April 2015, scoring a four-round unanimous decision (UD) victory against Bojana Libiszewska at the Arena Hall in Legionowo, Poland.

After compiling a record of 6–0 (1 KO), she defeated Isabelle Pare via UD to capture the vacant European female lightweight title on 30 September 2017, at the Hala ICDS in Łomianki, Poland, with the judges scorecards reading 100–90, 100–90 and 100–91.

After two-year maternity break, Sidorenko made her comeback on 19 October 2019, defeating Mayra Gomez via eight-round UD. Her next fight was a UD victory against Karina Kopinska in July 2020.

On 24 September 2021, Sidorenko fought Serbia's Jelena Janićijević for the vacant European female lightweight title with the contest ending in a draw. The boxers met again to decide the title on 5 March 2022, with Janićijević winning by split decision to hand Sidorenko the first defeat of her professional boxing career.

== Professional boxing record ==
12 fights	10 wins	1 loss
By knockout	1	0
By decision	9	1
Draws	1	

No.	Result	Record	Opponent	Type	Round, time	Date	Location	Notes
12	Win	10–1–1	(Montenegro) Aleksandra Vujovic	UD	6	18 November 2022	Grupa Azoty Arena, Pulawy, Poland	
11	Loss	9–1–1	(Serbia) Jelena Janićijević	SD	10	5 March 2022	Hala Osrodka Sportu, Dzierzoniow, Poland	For the vacant European lightweight title
10	Draw	9–0–1	(Serbia) Jelena Janićijević	SD	10	24 September 2021	Hala Sportowa, Oborniki Wielkopolskie, Poland	For the vacant European lightweight title
9	Win	9–0	(Poland) Karina Kopinska	UD	8	10 Jul 2020	Hala Sportowa, Pionki, Poland	
8	Win	8–0	(Argentina) Mayra Gomez	UD	8	19 Oct 2019	Hala ICDS, Łomianki, Poland	
7	Win	7–0	(France) Isabelle Pare	UD	10	30 Sep 2017	Hala ICDS, Łomianki, Poland	Won vacant European lightweight title
6	Win	6–0	(Serbia) Mirjana Vujic	TKO	1 (8), 1:08	6 May 2017	Hala MOSiR, Ełk, Poland	
5	Win	5–0	(Serbia) Milena Svonja	UD	6	5 Nov 2016	Hala ICDS, Łomianki, Poland	
4	Win	4–0	(Poland) Klaudia Szymczak	UD	6	14 May 2016	Hala Azoty, Kędzierzyn-Koźle, Poland	
3	Win	3–0	(Italy) Monica Gentili	UD	6	27 Feb 2016	MOSiR Hall, Radom, Poland	
2	Win	2–0	(Poland) Karina Kopinska	UD	6	19 Dec 2015	Hala ICDS, Łomianki, Poland	
1	Win	1–0	(Poland) Bojana Libiszewska	UD	4	18 Apr 2015	Legionowo Arena, Legionowo, Poland	

Sporting positions
Regional boxing titles
Vacant Title last held by Ewa Brodnicka	European female lightweight champion 30 September 2017 – 2018	Vacant Title next held by Miriam Gutiérrez
