= Katie Taylor vs. Flora Pili =

2026 boxing match

Once Upon A Time
- Date: September 5, 2026
- Venue: Croke Park, Dublin, Ireland
- Title(s) on the line: WBA, WBC, IBF, WBO, IBO and The Ring super lightweight titles

Tale of the tape
Boxer	Katie Taylor	Flora Pili
Nickname	KT	
Hometown	Bray, County Wicklow, Ireland	Saint-Avold, Moselle, France
Pre-fight record	25–1 (6 KO)	12–0 (2 KO)
Age	40 years, 2 months	29 years, 1 month
Height	5 ft 5 in (165 cm)	5 ft 8 in (173 cm)
Weight	139.6 lb (63 kg)	139.9 lb (63 kg)
Style	Orthodox	Orthodox
Recognition	Former two-division undisputed world champion	IBO super lightweight world champion

Result
- Taylor wins via 10-round UD (100-99, 100-99, 99-91)

Katie Taylor vs. Flora Pili, billed as Once Upon A Time, was a women's super lightweight professional boxing match contested between the former two-division undisputed world champion Katie Taylor and undefeated IBO super lightweight world champion Flora Pili. The bout was held on September 5, 2026, at Croke Park in Dublin with Taylor's WBA, IBF, WBO and The Ring super lightweight titles as well as Pili’s IBO and the vacant WBC super lightweight titles being on the line.

Taylor vs. Pili was the first boxing match to headline Croke Park since Muhammad Ali vs. Al Lewis in 1972. With an attendance of 83,000, it was the eleventh highest attendance in the history of boxing and the sixth highest attendance for a post-war boxing event.

Taylor defeated Pili by unanimous decision to become a three-time undisputed champion.

== Background ==
On 11 July 2025, after beating Amanda Serrano for the third and final time, Taylor at 39 years of age was considering retirement, with her promoter Eddie Hearn claiming that the only thing he could see making her reconsider retiring would be her finally getting to headline Croke Park, something that had been discussed for years but had never materialised.

On 17 September 2025, after Taylor had made the decision to take some time away from boxing to consider her future, the WBC made her champion in recess. The WBC also named her Champion Emeritus. Interim WBC champion Chantelle Cameron, who Taylor had previously beaten to become undisputed champion in 2023, was elevated to full champion status. Cameron was ordered to fight former world champion and long time rival Sandy Ryan for the WBC title. Cameron refused to fight Ryan and instead, only a month after being elevated to full champion, vacated the title. Ryan was instead ordered to fight Karla Ramos Zamora for the vacant WBC title on 21 February 2026. Despite suffering a broken hand early in the fight, Ryan pulled off the win via majority decision. After the fight, Ryan declared an interest in an undisputed title fight against Taylor.

Ryan vacated the title in June 2026 without making any defences, after announcing she was pregnant, and the WBC designated her as champion in recess. On 3 June 2026, the WBC ordered a fight for the vacant title between Taylor and undefeated 12–0 IBO female super-lightweight champion, Flora Pili, who was ranked No.1 by both the WBC and IBF respectively. On 5 June 2026, at a Matchroom Boxing press conference, it was announced that Taylor vs Pili would happen on 5 September 2026 at Croke Park, with Taylor defending her IBF, WBO and WBA titles and the vacant WBC title also being on the line.

== Weigh-in ==
The weigh-in took place at Trinity College Dublin and was heavily attended by fans from Ireland. Both fighters weighed in under the 140-pound super lightweight limit, with Pili at 139.9 pounds and Taylor at 139.6 pounds.

== The fight ==
In front of a crowd of 83,000 fans, Taylor defeated Pili via unanimous decision, with the three judges scoring the fight (100–90, 100–90, 99–91). Following the fight, she left her gloves, her titles and the Irish flag in the ring as she retired from the sport after 30 years, 20 as an amateur and ten as a professional.

== Fight card ==
Weight Class		vs.		Method	Round	Time	Notes
Super Lightweight	(Republic of Ireland) Katie Taylor (c)	def.	(France) Flora Pili	UD	10/10		^{Note 1}
Heavyweight	(United Kingdom) Dave Allen	vs.	(Republic of Ireland) Thomas Carty	NC	1/12	1:22
Welterweight	(Republic of Ireland) Paddy Donovan	def.	(Republic of Ireland) Tyrone McKenna	TKO	4/10	2:33
Super Middleweight	(United Kingdom) Taylor Bevan	def.	(Republic of Ireland) Emmet Brennan	TKO	6/10	0:36
Super bantamweight	(United Kingdom) Molly McCann	def.	(United Kingdom) Sylwia Doligala	UD	8/8
Super Bantamweight	(United Kingdom) Joe McGrail	def.	(United Kingdom) Matthew Boreland	TKO	5/10	3:03
Heavyweight	(Republic of Ireland) Adam Olaniyan	def.	(Czech Republic) Matej Hudak	KO	1/4	3:00
Super Welterweight	(Republic of Ireland) Bobbi Flood	def.	(United Kingdom) Jack Swallow	UD	4/4
Middleweight	(Republic of Ireland) Paul Ryan	def.	(United Kingdom) Paddy Gallagher	UD	4/4

^Note 1 For WBA, WBC, IBF, WBO, IBO and The Ring super lightweight titles

== Broadcasting ==
Country	Broadcaster
Ireland	RTÉ
United Kingdom	DAZN
United States	DAZN
