= Flora Pili =

French boxer (born 1997)

- Born: 21 July 1997 (age 29); Saint-Avold, Moselle, France
- Boxing career
- Height: 5 ft 8 in (173 cm)
- Weight: Super lightweight
- Stance: Orthodox

Boxing record
- Total fights: 13
- Wins: 12
- Win by KO: 2
- Losses: 1

Flora Pili (born 21 July 1997) is a French professional boxer. She held the IBO super lightweight title from December 5, 2025 to September 5, 2026 and holds a professional record of 12–1. She is ranked as the second best super lightweight by the WBC and the IBF.

As of 2026, Pili is ranked the world’s sixth best super lightweight by BoxRec.

== Early life ==
Pili was born on 21 July 1997 in Saint Avold, Moselle, France.

== Amateur career ==
As an amateur Pili became French Youth champion and won a Senior National title in 2015 and 2019, respectively, in 2017 she faced off against future 2 time Olympic gold medalist Kellie Harrington in a losing effort.

== Professional career ==
Pili made her professional debut in 2019 and amassed 12 straight wins capturing the French, European and WBO International titles.

=== IBO super lightweight champion ===
==== Pili vs. Janicijevic ====
On December 5, 2025 Pili challenged Jelena Janićijević for the IBO super lightweight title in her hometown of Saint-Avold, Moselle, France. Pili secured the victory via majority decision (MD) with one judge scoring the bout a draw at 95–95 while the other two scored it 98–92 and 97–93 respectively.

==== Pili vs. Taylor ====
On September 5, 2026 Pili faced Katie Taylor for the Undisputed super lightweight title, but lost by a unanimous decision.

== Professional boxing record ==
13 fights	12 wins	1 loss
By knockout	2	0
By decision	10	1

No.	Result	Record	Opponent	Type	Round, time	Date	Location	Notes
13	Loss	12–1	Katie Taylor	UD	10	5 Sep 2026	Croke Park, Dublin, Ireland	Lost IBO super lightweight title; For WBA, IBF, WBO, WBC and The Ring super lightweight titles
12	Win	12–0	Jelena Janićijević	MD	10	5 Dec 2025	Saint-Avold, Moselle, France	Won vacant IBO super lightweight title
11	Win	11–0	Ana Maria Lozano	TKO	10 (10)	4 Apr 2025	Saint-Avold, Moselle, France	Won WBO International Super Lightweight title
10	Win	10–0	Diana Rodriguez	PTS	10	26 Oct 2024	Ajaccio, France	
9	Win	9–0	Djemilla Gontaruk	PTS	10	25 May 2024	Ajaccio, France	
8	Win	8–0	Ioana Fecioru	UD	10	3 Nov 2023	Saint-Avold, Moselle, France	Retained EBU European Super Lightweight
7	Win	7–0	Silvia Bortot	SD	10	5 May 2023	Veneto, Italy	Won EBU European Super Lightweight
6	Win	6–0	Elsa Hemat	SD	8	15 Oct 2022	Saint-Avold, Moselle, France	Won vacant Federation Francaise De Boxe French Super Lightweight title
5	Win	5–0	Anna Ganova	TKO	1 (6)	4 June 2022	Moselle, France	
4	Win	4–0	Ksenija Medic	PTS	6	19 Mar 2022	Moselle, France	
3	Win	3–0	Aleksandra Ivanovic	PTS	6	28 Feb 2020	Saint-Avold, Moselle, France	
2	Win	2–0	Bojana Dukic	UD	4	8 Dec 2019	Rumelange, Netherlands	
1	Win	1–0	Ksenija Medic	PTS	4	2 Oct 2019	Saint-Avold, Moselle, France	
