= Juneau Park =

Coordinates: 43.044°N 87.897°W

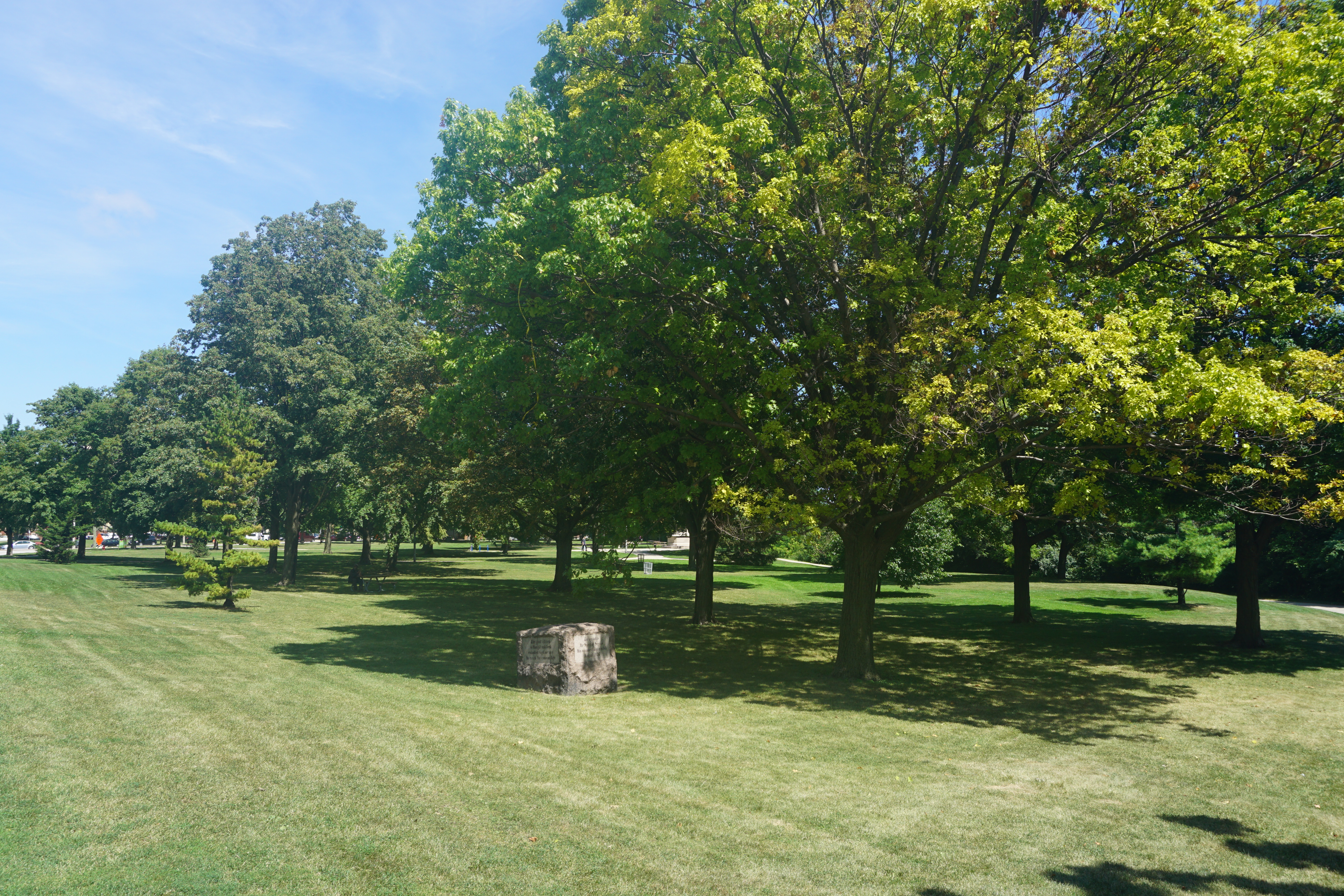
Juneau Park in 2022

Juneau Park, located in Milwaukee, Wisconsin, is situated on a bluff overlooking Lake Michigan. It is popular for its short distance to downtown Milwaukee, lakefront walking path, and vantage point for fireworks displays.

== Public art ==
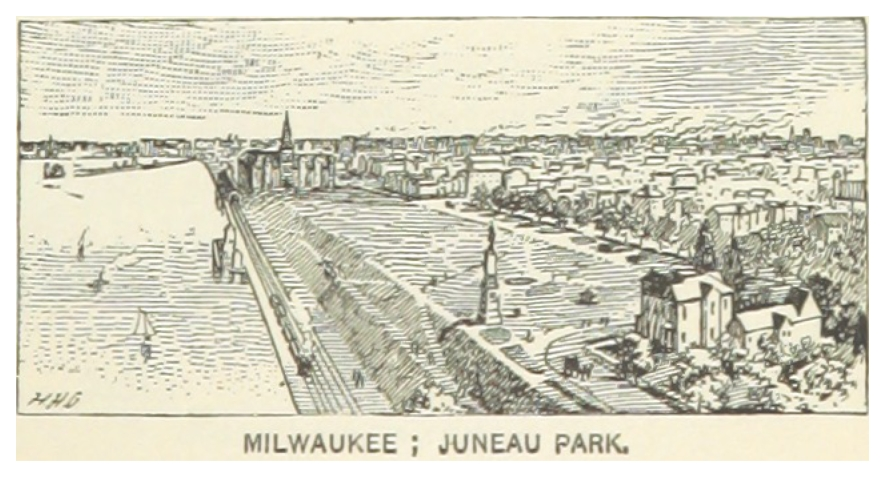
Juneau Park, Milwaukee, 1891

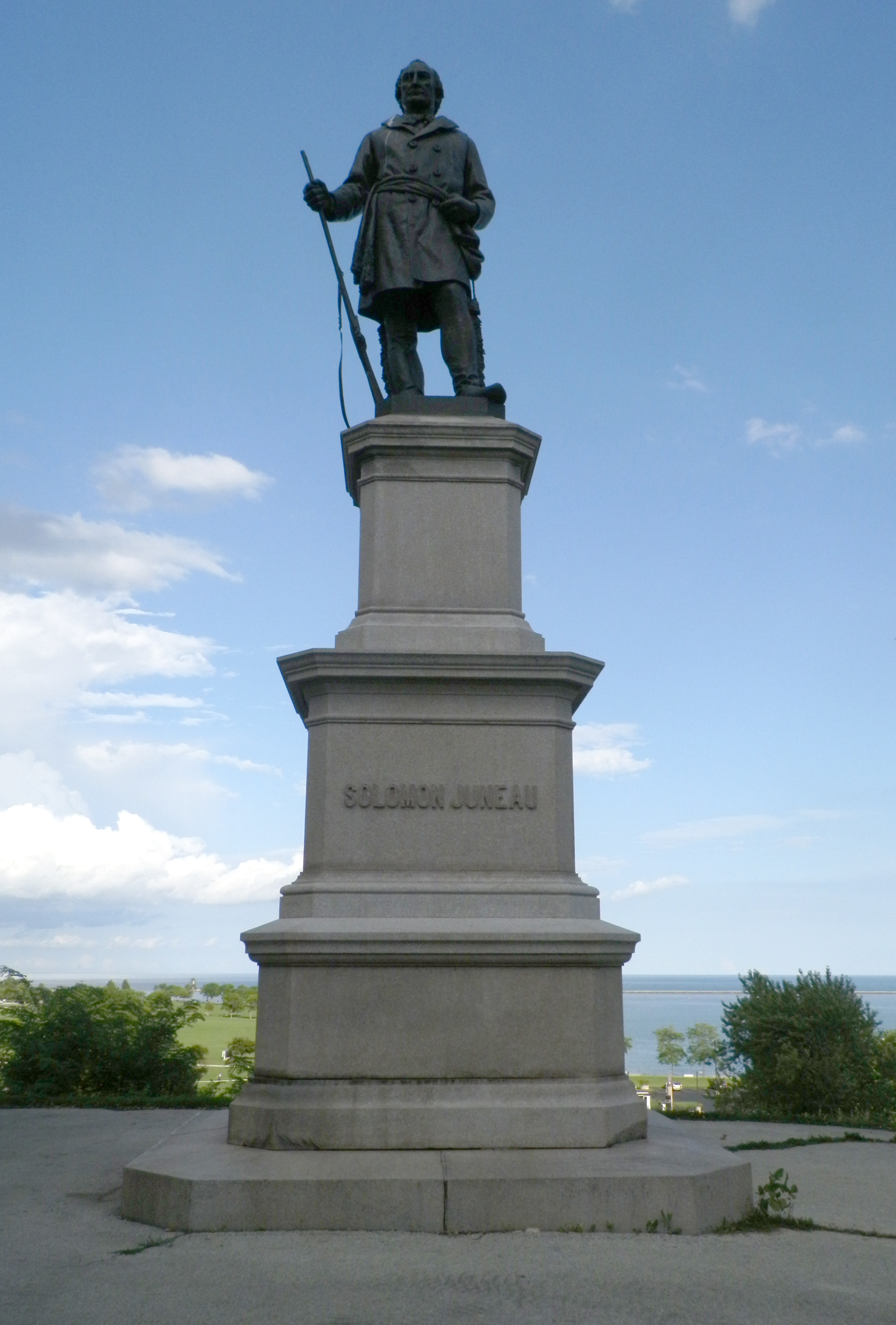
Juneau Monument

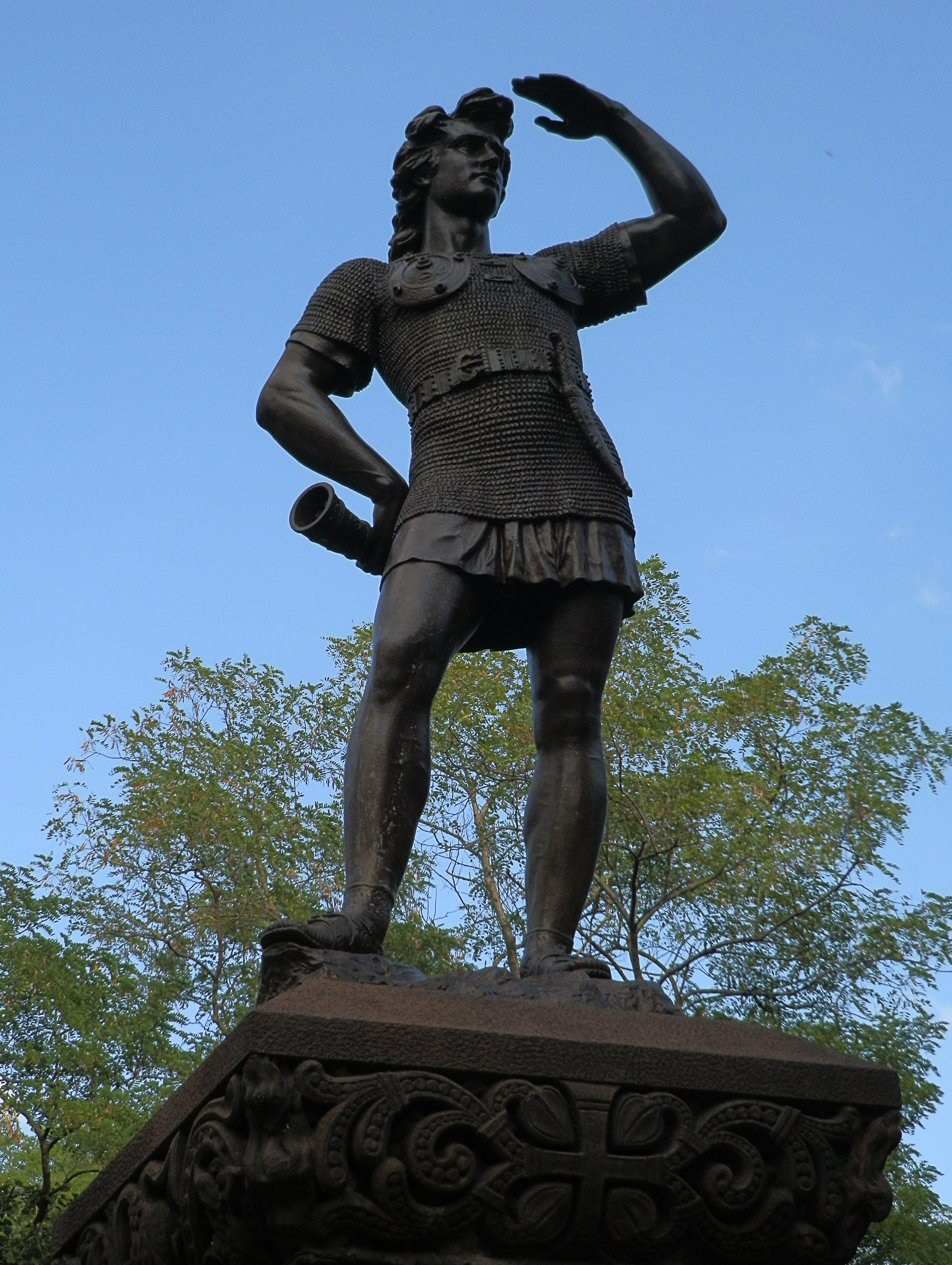
Leif, the Discoverer

Built in 1887 and designed by Richard Henry Park, the Juneau Monument is a tribute to the city's first mayor, Solomon Juneau. Also built in 1887, Leif, the Discoverer by sculptor Anne Whitney is a replica of her statue of Leif Erikson in Boston.

== Gertie the Duck ==
Gertie the Duck, an icon of Milwaukee history, was moved with her ducklings to the lagoon at Juneau Park in the mid-1940s for their safety. The story of a duck, Gertie, and her efforts to watch over nine eggs— and ultimately hatch six ducklings on a wood piling below the Wisconsin Avenue Bridge—was reported by Gordon MacQuarrie of the Milwaukee Journal and became an inspiration for many war-weary Americans near the end of World War II. Passers-by, the Boy Scouts, and a Wisconsin Humane Society officer watched over Gertie and her growing family. Besides local newspapers, the story was picked up in national and U.K. press. After surviving bad weather and a nearby fire, the ducks were relocated to the Juneau Park lagoon.
