= Leif Erikson =

Norse explorer (c. 970–c. 1020)

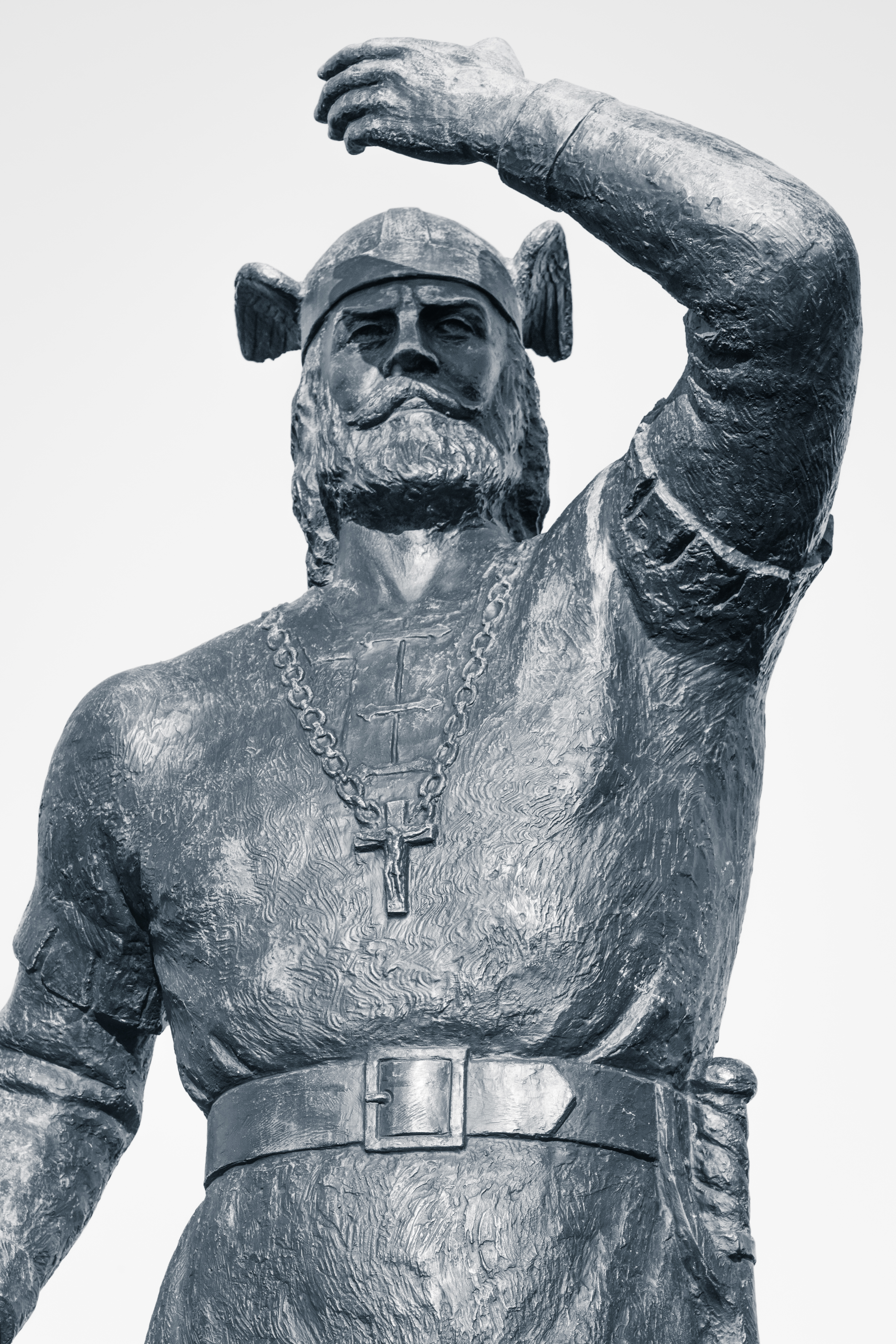
- Modern artistic representation of Leif Erikson in Leif Erikson Park, Duluth, U.S.
- Born: c. 970; Icelandic Commonwealth
- Died: c. 1018–c. 1025; Greenland
- Occupation: Explorer
- Known for: First European known to have reached Vinland (part of North America, likely Newfoundland)
- Partner: Thorgunna (c. 999)
- Children: 2
- Parent(s): Erik the Red (father); Þjóðhildur (mother)
- Relatives: Thorvald, Thorstein, and Freydís (siblings)

Leif Erikson, (Note: The patronym is Anglicised in various ways in the United States; according to one source, Leif Ericson is the most common rendering on the East Coast, while Leif Erikson is the most common rendering on the West Coast. Erikson is the spelling widely used and recognized by many others. Old Norse: Leifr Eiríksson [ˈlɛivz̠ ˈɛiˌriːksˌson]; Icelandic: Leifur Eiríksson [ˈleiːvʏr ˈeiːˌriksˌsɔːn]; Norwegian: Leiv Eiriksson; Swedish: Leif Eriksson; Danish: Leif Eriksen) also known as Leif the Lucky (c. 970s – c. 1018 to 1025), was a Norse explorer who is thought to have been the first European to set foot on continental America, approximately half a millennium before Christopher Columbus. According to the sagas of Icelanders, he established a Norse settlement at Vinland, which is usually interpreted as being coastal North America. There is ongoing speculation that the settlement made by Leif and his crew corresponds to the remains of a Norse settlement found in Newfoundland, Canada, called L'Anse aux Meadows, which was occupied approximately 1,000 years ago.

Leif's place of birth is unknown, although it is assumed to have been in Iceland. His father, Erik the Red, founded the first Norse settlement in Greenland, where Leif was later raised. Following his voyage to Vinland and the subsequent death of his father, Leif became chief of the Greenland settlement. He had two known sons: Thorgils, born in the Hebrides; and Thorkell, who succeeded him as Greenland's chieftain.

== Early life ==
Leif was the son of Erik the Red and his wife Thjodhild (Old Norse: Þjóðhildur), and, through his paternal line, the grandson of Thorvald Ásvaldsson. When Erik the Red was young, his father was banished from Norway for manslaughter, and the family went into exile in Iceland (which, during the century preceding Leif's birth, had been colonised by Norsemen, mainly from Norway). Leif was also a distant relative of Naddodd, who discovered Iceland.

Leif's year of birth is often estimated in the c. 970s. Though his birthplace is not accounted for in the sagas, it is likely he was born in Iceland, where his parents met—probably somewhere on the edge of Breiðafjörður, and possibly in the Haukadalur valley, where his mother's family was based. It was in this valley that Erik cleared land and built the farmstead Eiríksstaðir, in c. 970.

Erik was later banished from Iceland and sailed west to a place he named Greenland. He then briefly returned to Iceland to bring his family and other colonists back with him to Greenland, establishing its first permanent settlement in 986. Leif grew up on the family estate Brattahlíð in the Eastern Settlement of Greenland. He had two brothers, whose names were Thorstein and Thorvald, and a sister, Freydís. Tyrker, one of Erik's thralls, had been specially trusted to keep charge of Erik's children, as Leif later referred to him as his "foster father."

== Discovering Vinland ==
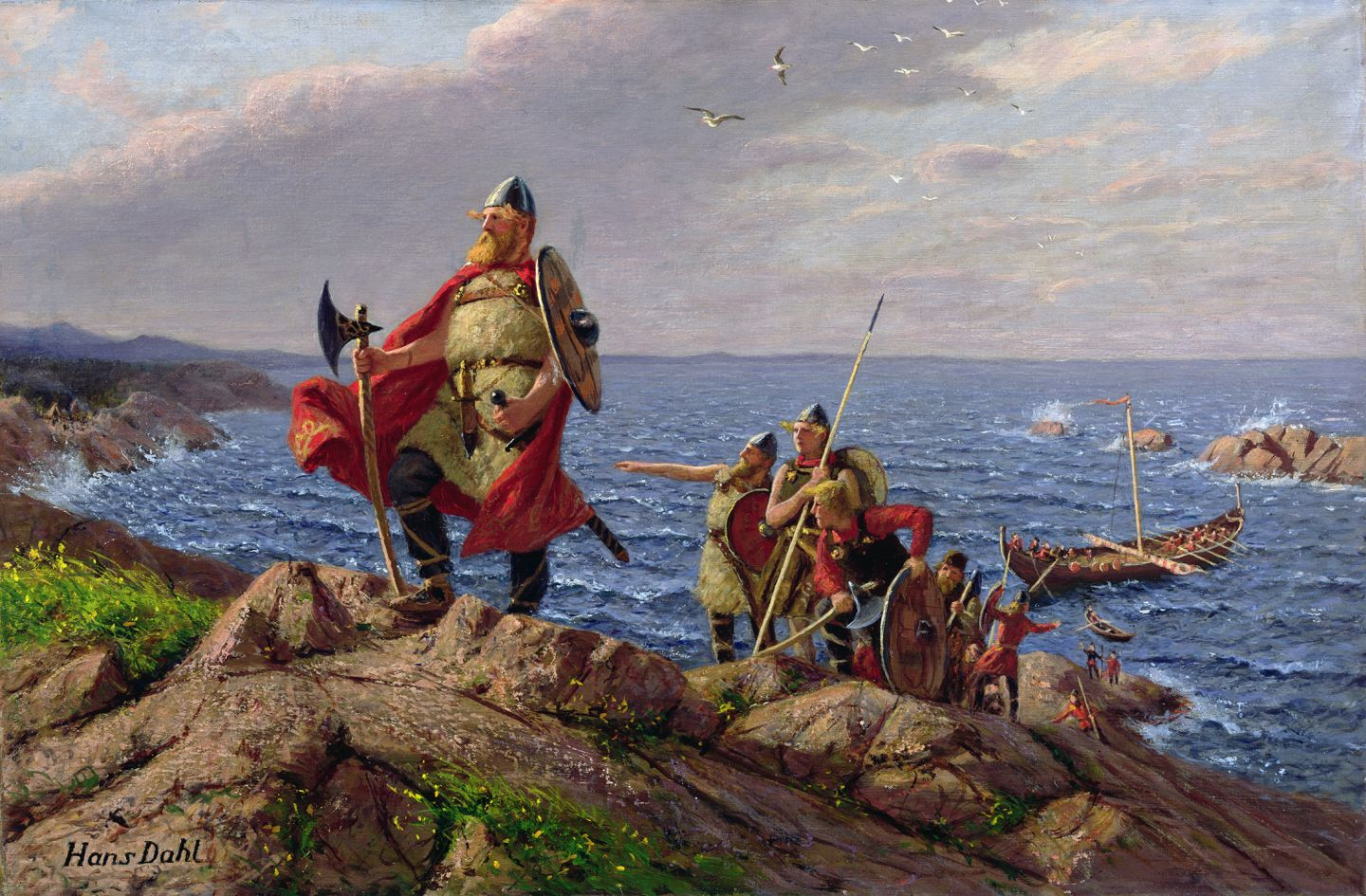
Leif Eriksson Discovers America by Hans Dahl (1849–1937)

The Saga of Erik the Red and the Saga of the Greenlanders, both thought to have been written around 1200, contain detailed, but sometimes conflicting accounts of the voyages to Vinland (usually interpreted as coastal North America). These sagas are generally regarded as works of literature, rather than purely historical accounts, with scholars debating their factual accuracy. The only known strictly historical mentions of Vinland appear in Adam of Bremen's historical treatise (c. 1075) and in the Book of Icelanders (c. 1122) by Ari the Wise, though both are merely passing references.

=== Account in the Saga of Erik the Red ===
The words Leifr hinn heppni, "Leif the Lucky", written out in the early 14th century Hauksbók, the oldest manuscript of the Saga of Erik the Red

According to this saga, Leif discovered Vinland after being blown off course on his way from Norway to Greenland. Before this voyage, Leif had spent time at the court of Norwegian King Olaf Tryggvesson, where he had converted to Christianity. When Leif encountered the storm that forced him off course, he had been on his way to introduce Christianity to the Greenlanders. After they had arrived at an unknown shore, the crew disembarked and explored the area. They found wild grapes, self-sown wheat, and maple trees. Afterwards, they loaded their ship with samples of these newly-found goods and sailed east to Greenland, rescuing a group of shipwrecked sailors along the way. For this act, and for converting Norse Greenland to Christianity, Leif earned the nickname "Leif the Lucky". Leif did not return to Vinland, but others from Greenland and Iceland did, including Thorfinn Karlsefni.

=== Account in the Saga of the Greenlanders ===
According to this saga, Leif was not the first European to discover Vinland. Instead Bjarni Herjólfsson and his crew—on a voyage from Iceland to Greenland—were overtaken by wind and fog, missed the southern tip of Greenland, and encountered an unknown coast. Believing it to be somewhere other than Greenland, they did not disembark but rather continued to sail and found two additional coasts that did not correspond with their understanding of Greenland. After sailing back east, they eventually made it to their original destination, and then told of their discoveries.

Roughly 15 years later, Leif approached Bjarni, purchased his ship, gathered a crew of thirty-five men, and mounted an expedition towards the lands Bjarni had described. Leif's father Erik was set to join him but dropped out after he fell from his horse on his way to the ship, an incident interpreted as a bad omen. Leif followed Bjarni's route in reverse and landed first in a rocky and desolate place he named Helluland (Flat-Rock Land; possibly Baffin Island or northern parts of Labrador). After venturing further by sea, he landed the second time in a forested place he named Markland (Forest Land; possibly near Cape Porcupine, Labrador). After two more days at sea, he landed on an island to the north (possibly Belle Isle), and then returned to the mainland, going past a cape on the north side (perhaps Cape Bauld). They sailed to the west of this and landed in a verdant area with a mild climate and plentiful supplies of salmon. As winter approached, he decided to encamp there and sent out parties to explore the country. During one of these explorations, Tyrker discovered that the land was full of vines and grapes. Leif therefore named the land Vinland ('Wineland'). There, he and his crew built a small settlement, which was called Leifsbudir (Leif's Booths) by later visitors from Greenland.

After having wintered over in Vinland, Leif returned to Greenland in the spring with a cargo of grapes and timber. On the return voyage, he rescued an Icelandic castaway and his crew, earning him the nickname "Leif the Lucky". Leif never returned to Vinland, but others from Greenland and Iceland did.

=== Archeological evidence of Vinland ===
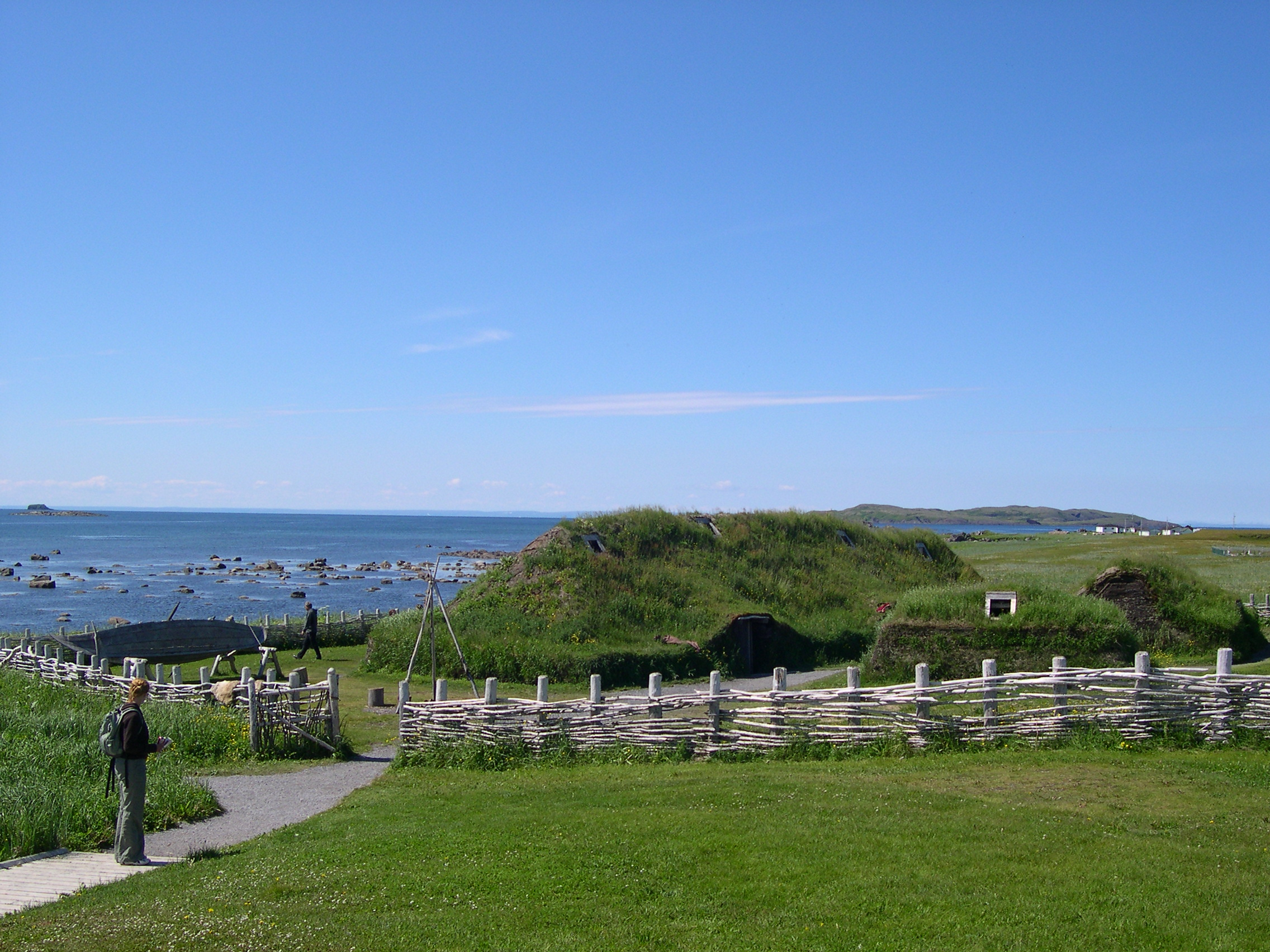
Modern recreation of the Norse site at L'Anse aux Meadows. The site was originally occupied c. 1021 and listed by UNESCO as a World Heritage Site in 1968

Most researchers and scholars agree that Vinland was a region in North America.

Research done in the early 1960s by Norwegian explorer Helge Ingstad and his wife, archaeologist Anne Stine Ingstad, identified a Norse site located at the northern tip of Newfoundland. It has been suggested that this site, known as L'Anse aux Meadows (carbon dating estimates 990–1050 CE and tree-ring analysis dating to the year 1021) could be Leifsbudir. The Ingstads demonstrated that Norsemen had reached North America about 500 years before Christopher Columbus. Later archaeological evidence suggests that Vinland may have been the areas around the Gulf of St. Lawrence and that the L'Anse aux Meadows site was a ship repair station and waypoint for voyages there. That does not necessarily contradict the identification of L'Anse aux Meadows as Leifsbudir since the two sagas appear to describe Vinland as a wider region which included several settlements. The Saga of Erik the Red mentions two other settlements in Vinland: one called Straumfjǫrðr, which lay beyond Kjalarnes promontory and the Wonderstrands, and one called Hóp, which was located even farther south.

== Personal life ==
Leif has been described in the Vinland sagas as a wise, considerate and strong man of striking appearance. When he was of a proper age, Leif went to Norway, likely to serve as a retainer to its king, Olaf Tryggvason. It was on this journey to Norway that the Saga of Erik the Red states that Leif's ship was driven to the Hebrides, where he and his crew were forced to remain for much of the summer, awaiting favorable winds. During his stay there, Leif fell in love with a noblewoman, Thorgunna, who gave birth to their son Thorgils. Thorgunna remained in the Hebrides when Leif left, as he refused to take her along without permission from her family. Thorgils was later sent to Leif in Greenland, but he did not become popular.

After arriving at the court of Norway's King Olaf Tryggvason, Leif was converted to Christianity. According to both the Saga of Erik the Red, and Olaf Tryggvason's Saga as found in Heimskringla, after Leif's conversion, the king then commissioned him to return to Greenland to convert the settlers there. During the journey, he was blown off course and discovered Vinland before finding his way to Greenland. Leif's father Erik reacted coldly to the suggestion that he should abandon his religion, while his mother Thjóðhildr became a Christian and built a church called Thjóðhild's Church. A different version of Olaf Tryggvason's Saga, found in Flateyjarbók, makes no reference to Leif being blown off course and discovering Vinland during his return from Norway, but indicates that after arriving in Greenland, all of that country was converted, including Leif's father Erik. Some versions of Olaf Tryggvason's Saga also indicate that to help with the conversion, Leif brought a priest and clerics with him to Greenland.

=== Chieftaincy and death ===
The winter following Leif's return from Vinland, his father died (shortly after 1000 CE), making Leif paramount chief in Greenland. Leif is last mentioned alive in 1018 in the Saga of St. Olaf. According to The Saga of the Sworn Brothers, by 1025 the chieftaincy of Eiríksfjǫrðr had passed to his son Thorkell. Nothing is mentioned about his death in the sagas—he probably died in Greenland sometime between these dates. Nothing further is known about his family beyond the succession of Thorkell as chieftain.

== Historicity ==
Leif is, in all likelihood, a historical figure who remains the first known European to set foot in continental North America, but other details of his life vary and are a subject of debate. It has been suggested by several scholars that both Leif's sister, Freydís, and his foster father, Tyrker, are works of fiction, as are their roles in the Vinland sagas. Leif's commission as a missionary to Greenland may also be fictional, as that aspect of his story is often attributed to Gunnlaugr Leifsson's version of Óláfs saga Tryggvasonar (which likely served as a source for some of the other sagas which mention Leif).

== Legacy ==
=== Norse and medieval Europe ===
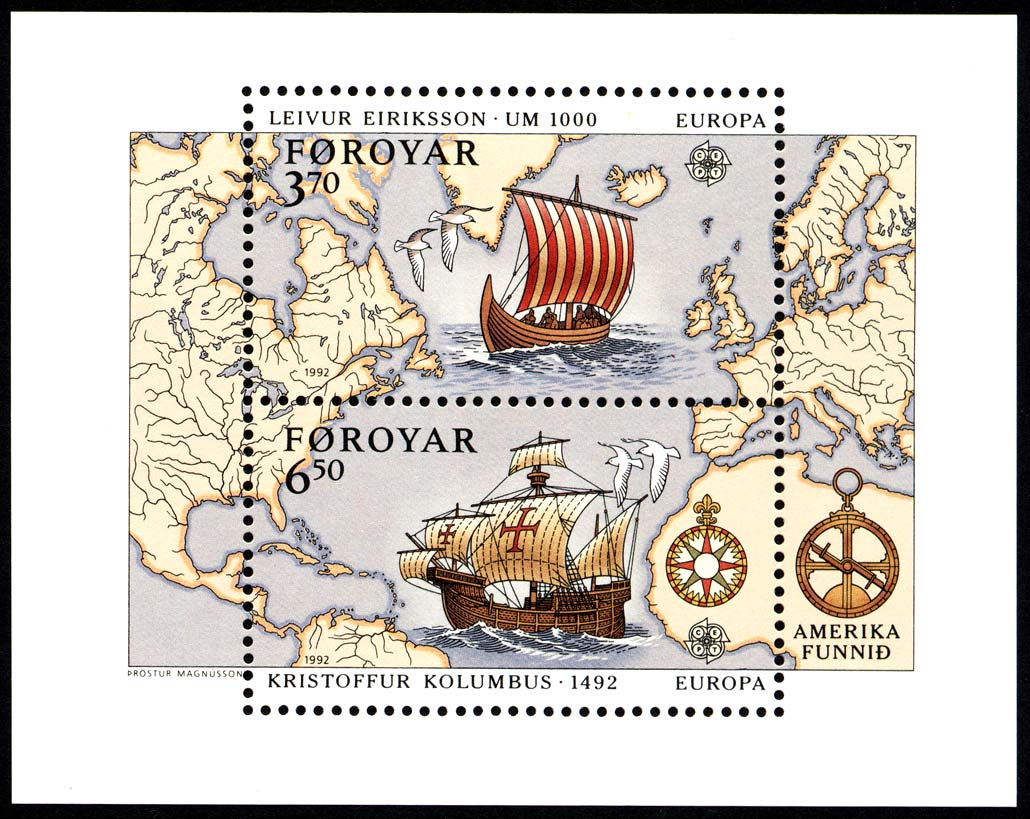
Discovery of America, a postage stamp from the Faroe Islands which commemorates both Leif Erikson and Christopher Columbus

Leif's successful expedition in Vinland encouraged other Norsemen to also make the journey, and the Norse became the first Europeans to colonize the area. In the end there were no permanent Norse settlements, although sporadic voyages at least to Markland for forages, timber and trade possibly lasted for centuries. The casual tone of references to these areas may suggest that their discovery was not seen as particularly significant by contemporaries, or that it was assumed to be public knowledge, or both. Knowledge of the Vinland journeys spread around medieval Europe, although to what extent is unclear; writers made mention of remote lands to the west, and notably the medieval chronicler Adam of Bremen directly mentions Vinland (c. 1075) based upon reports from the Danes. (Note: Adam mentions Vinland (Winland) in Chapter 39 of Book IV of his Gesta: 'In addition, he [i.e., Sweyn Estridsson, king of Denmark (reigned 1047–1076)] named one more island in this ocean, discovered by many, which is called "Vinland", because vines grow wild there, making the best wine. For [that] crops [that are] not sown, abound there, we learn not from fanciful opinion but from the true account of the Danes.' Adam von Bremen (1917). Schmeidler, Bernhard (ed.). Hamburgische Kirchengeschichte [Hamburg's Church History] (in Latin and German). Hannover and Leipzig, Germany: Hahnsche. pp. 275–276.) It has been suggested that the knowledge of Vinland might have been maintained in European seaports in the 15th century, and that Christopher Columbus, who claimed in a letter to have visited Iceland in 1477, could have heard stories of it.

=== Norse encounters with the Indigenous peoples ===
While Leif had no contact with the Indigenous peoples of Vinland, later Norse explorers did, referring to them as skrælingi, an archaic term for "wretches".

According to the Saga of Erik the Red, the first encounter was made during a colonizing expedition led by Thorfinn Karlsefni, which also included Leif's brother Thorvald. At first this group traded with the natives, but weeks later the new Norse settlement at Hóp was attacked and Karlsefni decided to abandon it. The Norse retreated to their other settlement at Straumfjǫrðr, where they remained and continued to explore the general area. One morning they encountered a one-legged native, who shot an arrow that killed Thorvald. He is famously known for pulling the arrow out, and poetically reciting the phrase, "This is a rich country we have found; there is plenty of fat around my entrails", upon which he dies. On their return to Greenland, Karlsefni's crew captured two native boys, taking them to Greenland.

According to the Saga of the Greenlanders, Leif's brother Thorvald made first contact with the natives. The encounter happened while Thorvald and his crew were exploring the coast, likely in the Markland area, and found nine natives asleep under boats. They attacked the natives, killing eight of them, while one escaped. Shortly after, in an apparent reprisal, Thorvald was killed by a native's arrow. Later, Thorfinn Karlsefni led a group to colonize Vinland and encountered natives, who they initially traded with, but relations soured when a native was killed attempting to steal weapons from the Norse. In retaliation, the natives attacked and Karlsefni decided to abandon the colony.

=== Travels and commemoration ===
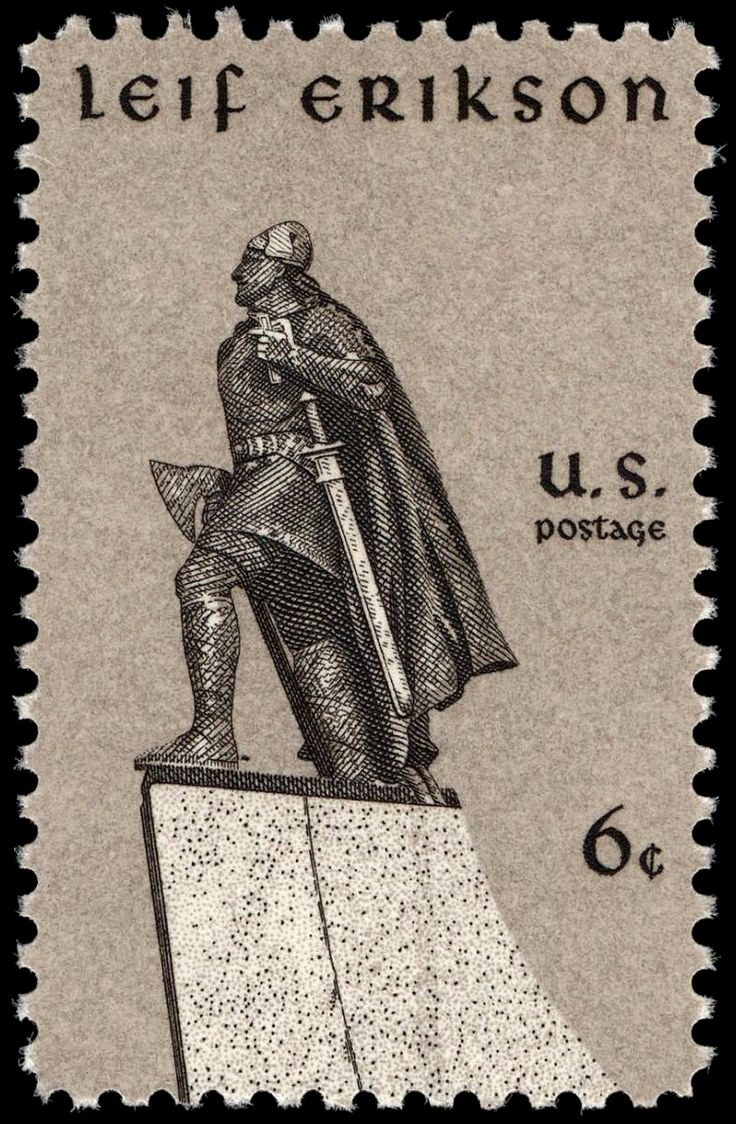
Erikson commemorative stamp, issued 9 October 1968, Leif Erikson Day

Stories of Leif's journey to North America had a profound effect on the identity and self-perception of later US citizens of Nordic descent and Nordic immigrants to the US. The first statue of Erikson (by Anne Whitney) was erected in Boston in 1887 at the instigation of Eben Norton Horsford, who was among those who believed that Vinland could have been located on the Charles River or Cape Cod; not long after, another casting of Whitney's statue was erected in Milwaukee. A statue was also erected in Chicago in 1901, having been originally commissioned for the 1893 World's Columbian Exposition to coincide with the arrival of the reconstructed Viking ship from Bergen, Norway. Another work of art made for the 1893 World's Columbian Exposition, the painting Leiv Eirikson Discovering America by Christian Krohg, was in the possession of a Leif Erikson Memorial Association in Chicago before being given back to the National Gallery of Norway in 1900.

For the centenary of the first official immigration of Norwegians to America, President Calvin Coolidge stated at the 1925 Minnesota State Fair, to a crowd of 100,000 people, that Leif had indeed been the first European to discover America. Additional statues of him were erected at the Minnesota State Capitol in St. Paul in 1949, near Lake Superior in Duluth, Minnesota, in 1956, and in downtown Seattle.

In 1924, a party of four consisting of citizens from Sweden, England, and two from the US attempted to emulate Leif's voyage in an eponymous 40-foot vessel but were lost after reaching the west coast of Greenland.

In 1930, a statue of Leif was erected in the city centre of Reykjavík, Iceland – currently situated in front of Hallgrímskirkja – as a gift from the United States to Iceland to commemorate the 1,000 year anniversary of Alþingi, the parliament of Iceland.

The Leif Erikson Awards, established 2015, are awarded annually by The Exploration Museum in Húsavík, Iceland. They are awarded for achievements in exploration and in the study of the history of exploration.

Several ships are named after Leif – a Viking ship replica, a commercial passenger/vehicle ferry, and a large dredger.

Erikson is recalled as Leif the Lucky in the Robert Frost poem Wild Grapes.

==== Leif Erikson Day ====
In 1929, the Wisconsin Legislature passed a bill to make 9 October "Leif Erikson Day" in the US state, and in the years following, several other states adopted laws to observe the day. In 1935, legislation was introduced to the US Congress requesting federal observance of the day. Before the legislation was passed, it was amended so that the observance would only occur in 1935 (which it was, following a proclamation that year by President Franklin D. Roosevelt). In the subsequent decades, a number of unsuccessful attempts were made to pass legislation requesting Leif Erikson Day be proclaimed annually by the president. Proponents eventually succeeded, when, in 1964, the Congress authorized and requested the president to proclaim 9 October of each year as "Leif Erikson Day". In the years since, each president has issued an annual proclamation calling for observance of the day.

The Sagas do not give the exact date of Leif's landfall in America, but state only that it was in the fall of the year. At the suggestion of Christian A. Hoen of Edgerton, Wisconsin, 9 October was settled upon for Leif Erikson Day, as that already was a historic date for Norwegians in America, the ship Restaurationen having arrived in New York Harbor on 9 October 1825 from Stavanger with the first organised party of Norwegian immigrants.

=== Gallery of art and sculptures ===
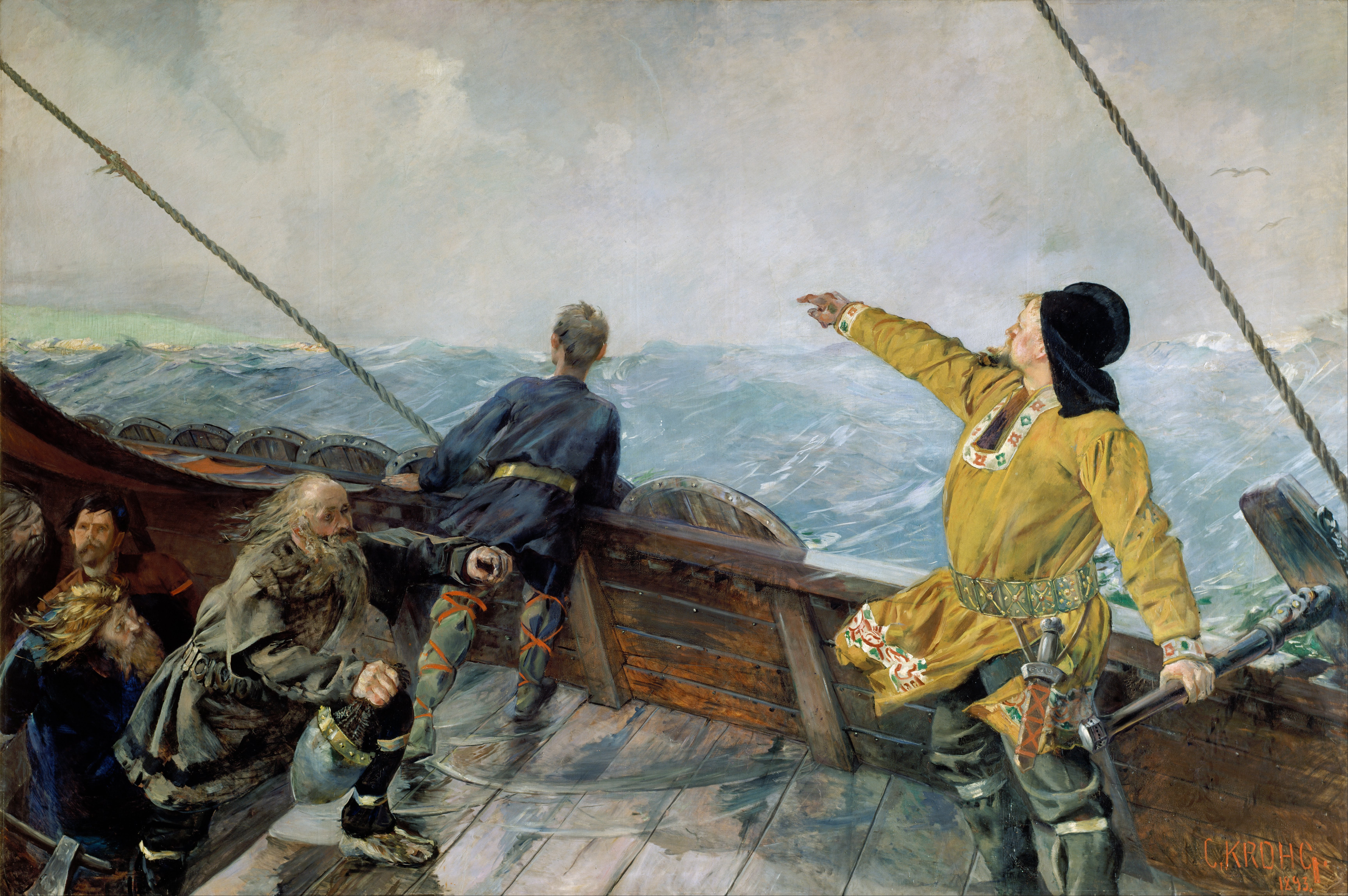
Leiv Eirikson Discovering America by Christian Krohg (1893)

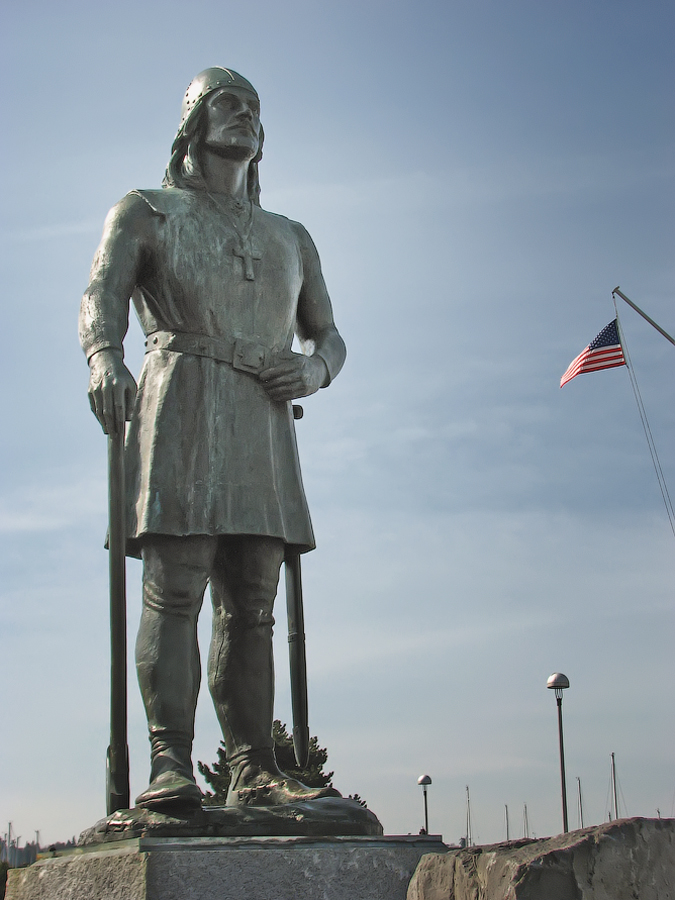
Leif Erikson memorial statue at Shilshole Bay Marina, Port of Seattle

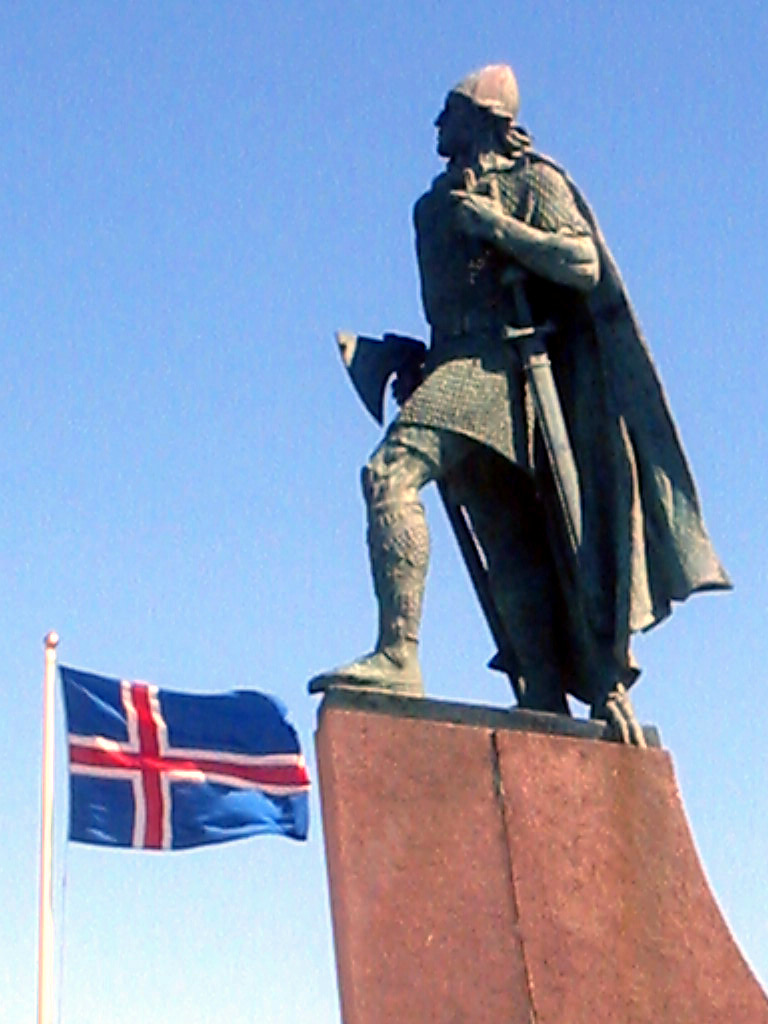
Leif Eriksson Memorial (1929–1932), Reykjavík, Iceland. This statue is at the front of the Hallgrímskirkja. There is a copy of this statue in Newport News, Virginia, USA.

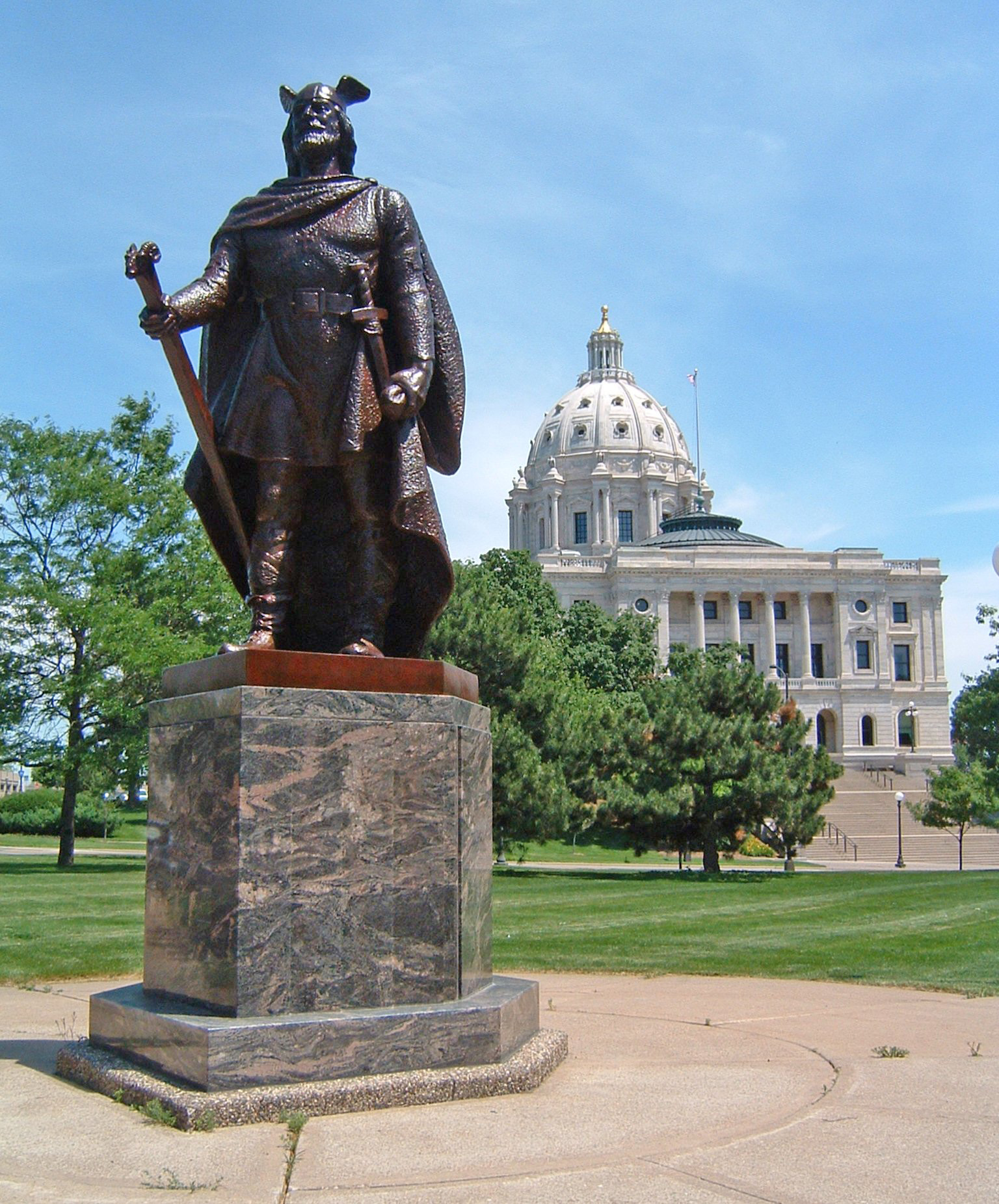
Leif Erikson by John K. Daniels, 1948–49, near the Minnesota State Capitol.

The oldest public statue of Leif Erikson, by Anne Whitney, placed in Boston in 1887.

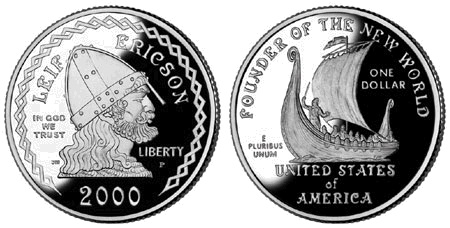
A 'Leif Ericson' proof dollar from the United States, minted in 2000. It reads 'Founder of the New World'

=== In fiction ===
The character 'Leif Ericson' features in this Japanese manga adaptation of the Vinland sagas.

- Leif is the main character in the 1928 film The Viking.
- An Old Captivity is a novel which involves a dream sequence featuring a character called Leif Ericson. Notably, it also features an attempt to uncover historical Viking settlements using air surveys. It was written by Nevil Shute and published in 1940.
- In children's literature, Leif the Lucky written and illustrated by Ingri and Edgar Parin d'Aulaire. Published by Doubleday & Company, Inc., 1941.
- Leif is one of the main characters in Makoto Yukimura's manga Vinland Saga.
- Leif is the main character in the juvenile historical novel Vinland the Good. The author is Henry Treece, and it is illustrated by William Stobbs. It is an account of Viking Era explorations, based mainly on the Greenland saga.
- Leif is a main character in the Netflix historical drama series Vikings: Valhalla played by Sam Corlett.
- The Leif Erikson is the name of Hagbard Celine's golden submarine in The Illuminatus! Trilogy.
- In Sid Meier's Civilization VI, players can recruit Leif as a Great Admiral.

== See also ==
- Leif Erikson Awards
- Leif Ericson Millennium commemorative coins
- Alonso Sánchez, a Spanish navigator who purportedly visited the Americas before Columbus
- Saint Brendan, a legendary Irish navigator
- Jean Cousin, a French navigator with a similar claim
- Kunyu Wanguo Quantu, 1602 Chinese world map purportedly transcribed with Chinese data from 1430

== Bibliography ==
- Campbell, Gordon (2021). Norse America: The Story of a Founding Myth. Oxford: Oxford University Press. ISBN 978-0-19-886155-3.
- Ingstad, Helge (1985). The Norse Discovery of America (Volume 2): The Historical Background and the Evidence of the Norse Settlement Discovered in Newfoundland. Oslo: Norwegian University Press (Universitetsforlaget AS). ISBN 82-00-07039-5.
- Reeves, Arthur Middleton (1890). The finding of Wineland the Good : the history of the Icelandic discovery of America. London: H. Frowde, Oxford University Press.
- Short, William R. (2010). Icelanders in the Viking age: the people of the sagas. McFarland. ISBN 978-0-7864-4727-5. Archived from the original on 21 May 2022.
- Somerville, Angus; McDonald, Andrew R. (2010). The Viking Age: A Reader. University of Toronto Press. ISBN 978-1-4426-0148-2. Archived from the original on 24 January 2021.
- Wallace, Birgitta Linderoth (2006). Westward Vikings: The Saga of L'Anse aux Meadows. St. John's, NL: Parks Canada and the Historic Sites Association of Newfoundland and Labrador. ISBN 0-919735-09-6.
