= Statue of Leif Erikson (Seattle) =

Statue in Seattle, Washington, U.S.

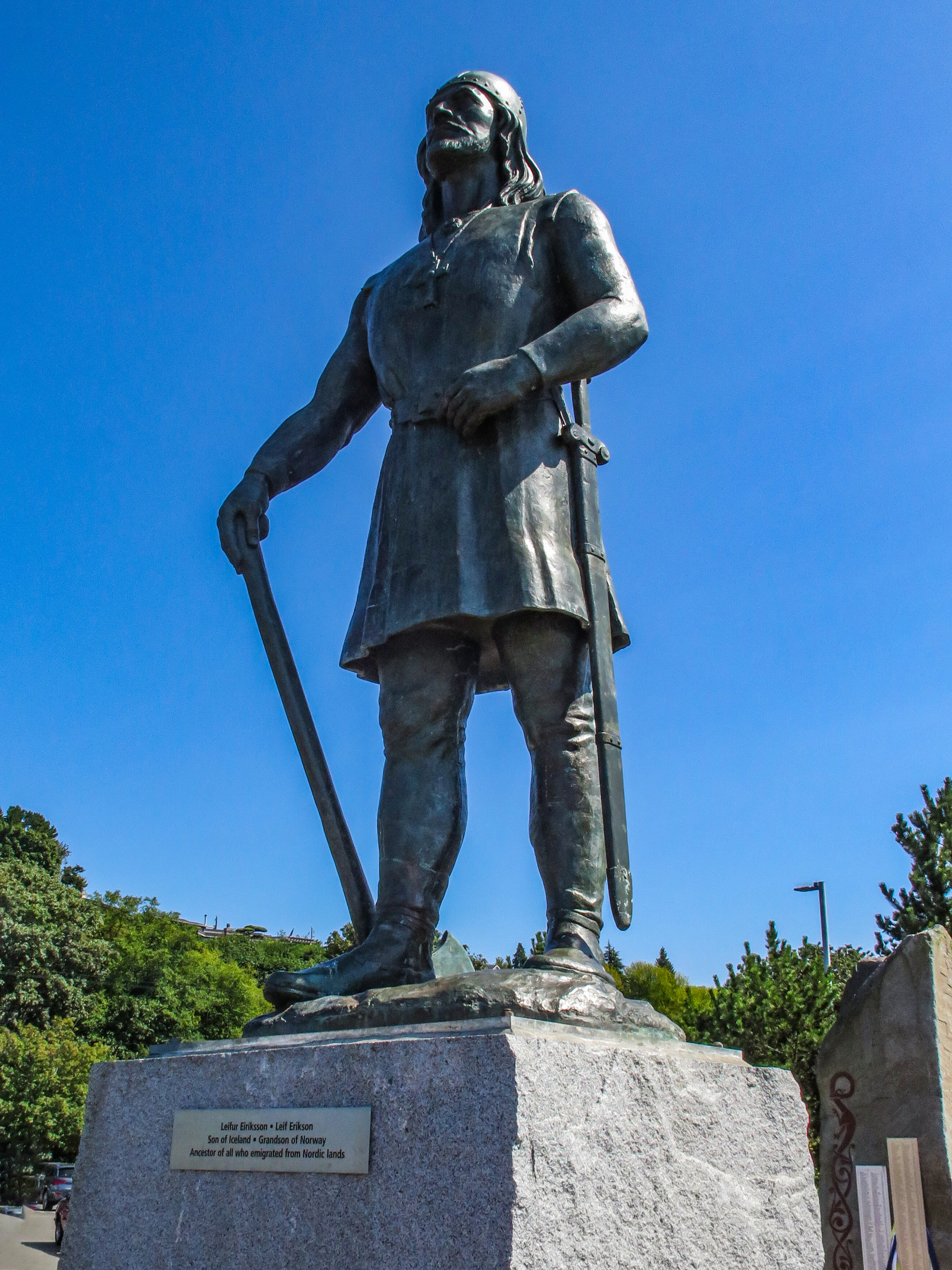
- The statue in 2018
- Subject: Leif Erikson
- Location: Seattle, Washington, U.S.; 47°40′47.49″N 122°24′21.43″W

A statue of Leif Erikson is installed at Seattle's Shilshole Bay Marina, in the U.S. state of Washington. The 16-foot tall sculpture was donated by the Leif Erikson League for the Century 21 Exposition. It was relocated to Shilshole Marina in 2007. According to Lonely Planet, the statue is surrounded by a stone circle and serves as "an important reminder of Seattle's (and Ballard's) Nordic heritage".

== Background and history ==
Seattle's strong Scandinavian-American community is historically centered in Ballard, the neighborhood where the Shilshole Bay Marina is located, and is particularly strong in the maritime trades. The bronze Leif Erikson statue, designed by University of Washington music professor August Werner (1893-1980), was unveiled June 17, 1962. Since 1963, maritime charts have noted the statue as a navigational landmark.

Seattle's Scandinavian-American community had celebrated Leif Erikson Day annually on October 9 beginning in 1941. Trygve "Ted" Nakkerud (1903-1995) began advocating for a statue of Leif Erikson in 1956, and founded the Leif Erikson League (still extant 2022 as the Leif Erikson Society) April 29, 1957, with members from 17 different Scandinavian groups in Seattle to raise funds and obtain an appropriate site. The league was chaired by Thorbjorn Grønning (1888-1969). They raised US$40,000 to cast the statue, and began negotiations to have an appropriate place to put the statue. Early efforts would have placed the statue at Seattle Center (then the "Civic Center" and soon to be the site of the Century 21 Exposition, a World's Fair) or in a city park.

Originally the League planned to hold a competition for the designer of the statue, but Werner put himself forward and convinced the League to skip that and appoint him. This was not without rancor, including that architect and league member John Engan, who initially worked with Werner, declined to work with him after Werner ignored Engan's structural advice and an early model of the statue collapsed. Werner also feuded with the league over who should do the casting; he ultimately won that battle, and the bronze was cast by Franco Vianello and Spero Anargyros in Berkeley, California, rather than in New York or Oslo. The City expressed concern over the possibility of city parks becoming "overrun" with statues sponsored by cultural and civic clubs, and the Municipal Art Commission had doubts about the aesthetics of the statue, but once the Shilshole location was negotiated (on Port land rather than City land) the Arts Commission approved that plan unanimously. The Port Commission was also unanimous in voting a go-ahead on February 27, 1962.

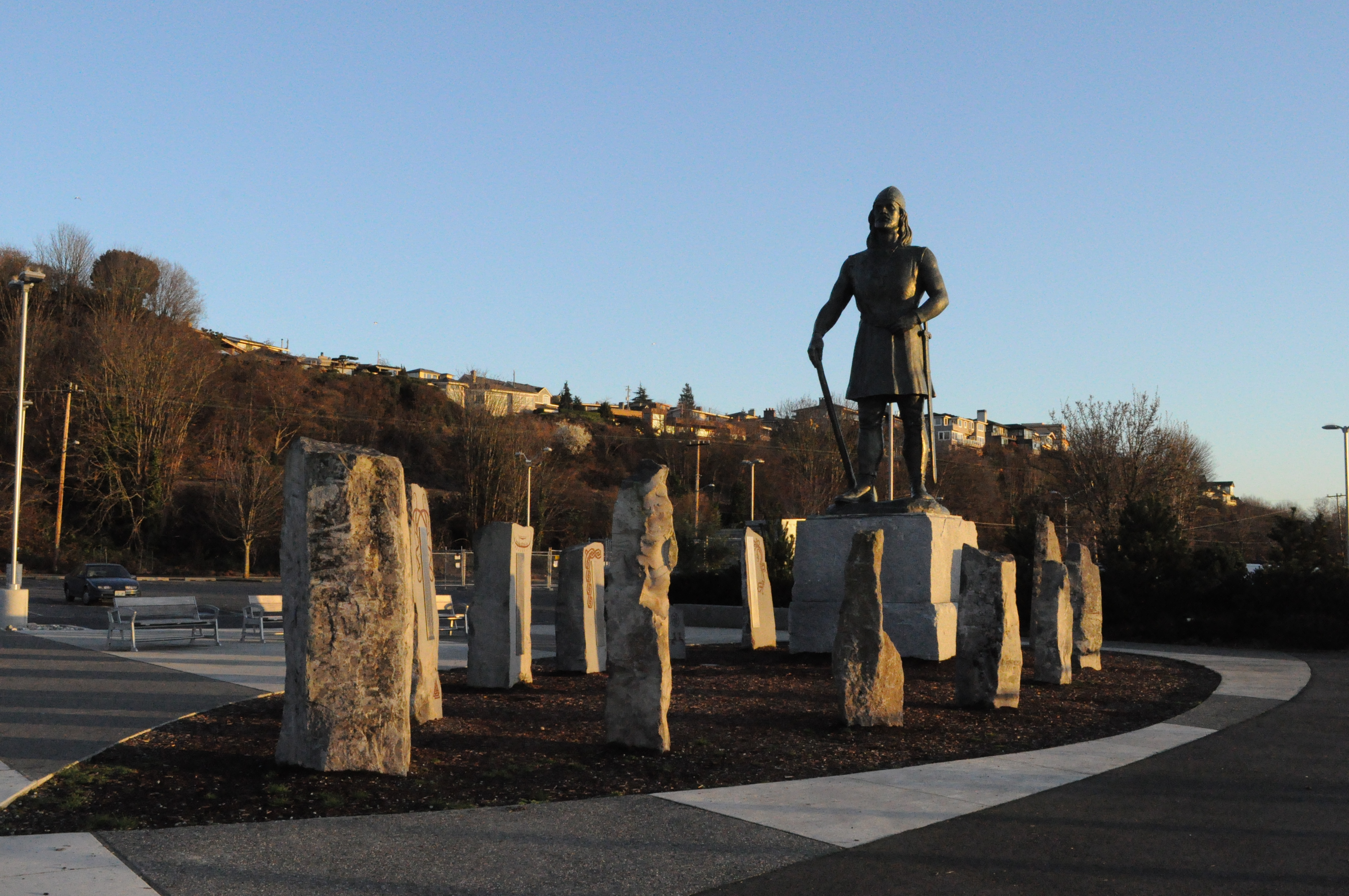
The statue in 2010

The statue was moved within the marina in 2007; the current pedestal dates from that year, as do the 14 "runestones" and the longboat-shaped plaza. The runic carvings on the stones are by Jay Haavik. Besides the names of people directly involved in the initial project, beginning in 2007 more than 2,300 additional names of Scandinavian immigrants have been inscribed either on the statue's base or on one of the "runestones".

== Copies ==
There are three later 10-foot (3.0 m) copies of the statue, also in bronze, located elsewhere in the world: Trondheim, Norway (1997); Brattahlid, Greenland (2000); and L'Anse aux Meadows, Newfoundland (2013).

Three busts based on Werner's statue exist in the following locations: Cleveland, Ohio (2001); the Leif Erikson Lodge of the Sons of Norway in Seattle (2003); and Uig, Isle of Lewis, Hebrides (2018).
