= Vinland Saga (manga) =

Japanese manga series and its adaptation

- First tankōbon volume cover (Afternoon edition), featuring Thorfinn

ヴィンランド・サガ (Vinrando Saga)
- Genre: Adventure; Epic; Historical
- Manga
- Written by: Makoto Yukimura
- Published by: Kodansha
- English publisher: NA: Kodansha USA
- Imprint: Shōnen Magazine Comics; (former); Afternoon KC; (current)
- Magazine: Weekly Shōnen Magazine; (April 13 – October 5, 2005); Monthly Afternoon; (December 24, 2005 – July 25, 2025)
- Original run: April 13, 2005 – July 25, 2025
- Volumes: 29
- Anime television series
- Vinland Saga (2019–2023)
- icon

Vinland Saga (Japanese: ヴィンランド・サガ, Hepburn: Vinrando Saga) is a Japanese manga series written and illustrated by Makoto Yukimura. Published by Kodansha, the series was first serialized in the shōnen manga (boys-targeted) magazine Weekly Shōnen Magazine from April to October 2005 before moving to the seinen manga magazine Monthly Afternoon, aimed at young adult men, where it ran from December 2005 to July 2025. Its chapters were collected in 29 tankōbon volumes. Vinland Saga has been licensed for English-language publication by Kodansha USA. The series is a dramatization of the story of the Icelandic explorer Thorfinn Karlsefni and his expedition to find Vinland. The story covers Thorfinn's fictional counterpart's transition from a bloodthirsty, revenge-filled teenager to a pacifistic young man.

Inspired by the King of Norway, Olaf Tryggvasson, Yukimura decided to write Vinland Saga as a story about slavery. However, Yukimura's editor was against the original idea of Thorfinn being a slave, so the character was changed to a Viking. The author agreed because he wanted Thorfinn to understand the tragedy he caused as a Viking in later parts of the story. Yukimura projected his feelings during the Cold War and the September 11 attacks onto Thorfinn's character. Thorfinn is traumatized by his actions as a warrior and decides to find Vinland, a place where people of different races can live together peacefully.

The manga has been adapted into an anime television series produced by Wit Studio, with a first 24-episode season aired from July to December 2019. A second 24-episode season produced by MAPPA aired from January to June 2023.

By August 2022, Vinland Saga had over 7 million copies in circulation. The series won the 13th Japan Media Arts Festival's Grand Prize in 2009 and the 36th Kodansha Manga Award for Best General Manga in 2012. It has been critically acclaimed, with praise given to the story, art, characters, themes, and setting.

== Synopsis ==
=== Setting ===
Vinland Saga is initially set mostly in England in 1013 AD, which has been mostly conquered by the Danish King Sweyn Forkbeard. As King Sweyn nears death, his sons, Prince Harald and Prince Canute, argue over his succession. The story draws elements from historical accounts of the period, such as The Flateyjarbók, The Saga of the Greenlanders, and The Saga of Erik the Red.

=== Plot ===
==== War Arc ====
In 1013 AD, the young Thorfinn works for Askeladd in the hopes of challenging him to a duel and killing him in revenge for his father Thors's death, when they were attacked by him on a journey to England. Askeladd's company finds employment as mercenaries under King Sweyn in the Danish invasion of London. They are opposed by the British and Thorkell the Tall, Thorfinn's great-uncle who served with Thors in the Jomsvikings. When Thorkell takes Sweyn's son Prince Canute captive, Askeladd's company captures the prince with the intent of selling him to either side for a profit. Askeladd changes his plan to act on his personal agenda as a descendant of Artorius, to secure his mother's homeland of Wales from being invaded. Askeladd is ultimately forced to sacrifice himself by killing Sweyn during an audience when the king announces his plan to invade Wales, feigning madness as Canute kills him, so the Prince could take over Dane-occupied England without question. A shocked Thorfinn tries to assassinate King Canute, but is sentenced to a life of enslavement when stopped by Thorkell.

==== Slave Arc ====
Two years after Askeladd's death, a 19 year old Thorfinn works on a farm in Denmark owned by Ketil, a rich farmer who treats slaves well. He later befriends another slave named Einar who helps him treasure his life after learning of his past. With the help of Einar, and Ketil's father Sverker, Thorfinn learns to let go of his dark past. By this time, Canute has become both King of England and Denmark after poisoning his brother Harald, and begins a campaign with Ketil's farm, tricking Ketil's sons Thorgil and Olmar into justifying the seizure, with Ketil's men easily defeated by Canute's Jomsvikings. Thorfinn confronts Canute to convince him to spare the farmers. Upon witnessing Thorfinn's transformation into a pacifist, Canute relinquishes his claim to the farm. When their friend Arnheid is killed by Ketil in rage, Thorfinn remembers his father's words about the peaceful lands of Vinland and agrees with Einar to reach them together. The two are subsequently released from their enslavement, and they depart with Leif Erikson, an old friend of Thors, to sail back to Iceland.

==== Eastern Expedition Arc ====
After being reunited with his family, Thorfinn shares his plans to settle in Vinland. To finance their journey, Thorfinn, Leif, Einar, and Leif's adopted son, Thorfinn "Bug-Eyes", devise a plan to travel to Greece and sell narwhal horns. Thorfinn's crew is later joined by Gudrid, an Icelandic girl fleeing an unwanted marriage; Karli, a baby boy the crew find orphaned on the Faroe Islands alongside a dog; and Hild, the daughter of an inventor with a grudge against Thorfinn. After attempting to fight a group of Jomsvikings, the group are captured and end up in service under Thorkell. Thorfinn recommences his journey with his crew, drawing away the assassins around a set of islands while the rest of the crew escapes toward Odense. They meet Captain Vagn, the leader of a rebel camp of Jomsvikings who seeks to usurp power from Floki before it goes into the hands of Floki's grandson Baldr. The surviving men of Vagn's camp swear allegiance to Thorkell, who defeats Floki and captures him and Baldr. Thorfinn is temporarily made leader of the Jomsvikings and carries out orders from Canute to disband the Jomsvikings and spare Floki and Baldr from execution. Free from the Vikings, Thorfinn's group continues their journey.

==== Vinland Arc ====
Two years later, Thorfinn's crew returns to Iceland with the wealth they acquired from selling narwhal horns in Greece. Thorfinn and Gudrid marry and raise Karli as their son. With the resources promised by Halfdan, Thorfinn begins to assemble a crew to settle in Vinland. Thorfinn creates a peaceful haven where weapons are no longer necessary by clearing a portion of the forest and successfully cultivating wheat. Additionally, he and his companions are able to negotiate a peaceful relationship with the native Mi'kmaq, who come to see them as tranquil settlers. However, as time passes, tensions regarding resources and diseases brought by the settlers stoke conflict between the settlers and the natives. War eventually breaks out between the two factions, and Einar is unintentionally killed after the two sides broker a truce. As a stipulation of the truce, Thorfinn and his settlers agree to leave Vinland, but Karli hopes they will one day find peace on Vinland no matter how many years it takes. Thorfinn returns home and meets his newborn child while the natives cultivate wheat given to them by Thorfinn.

== Production ==
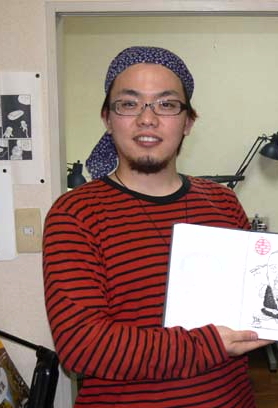
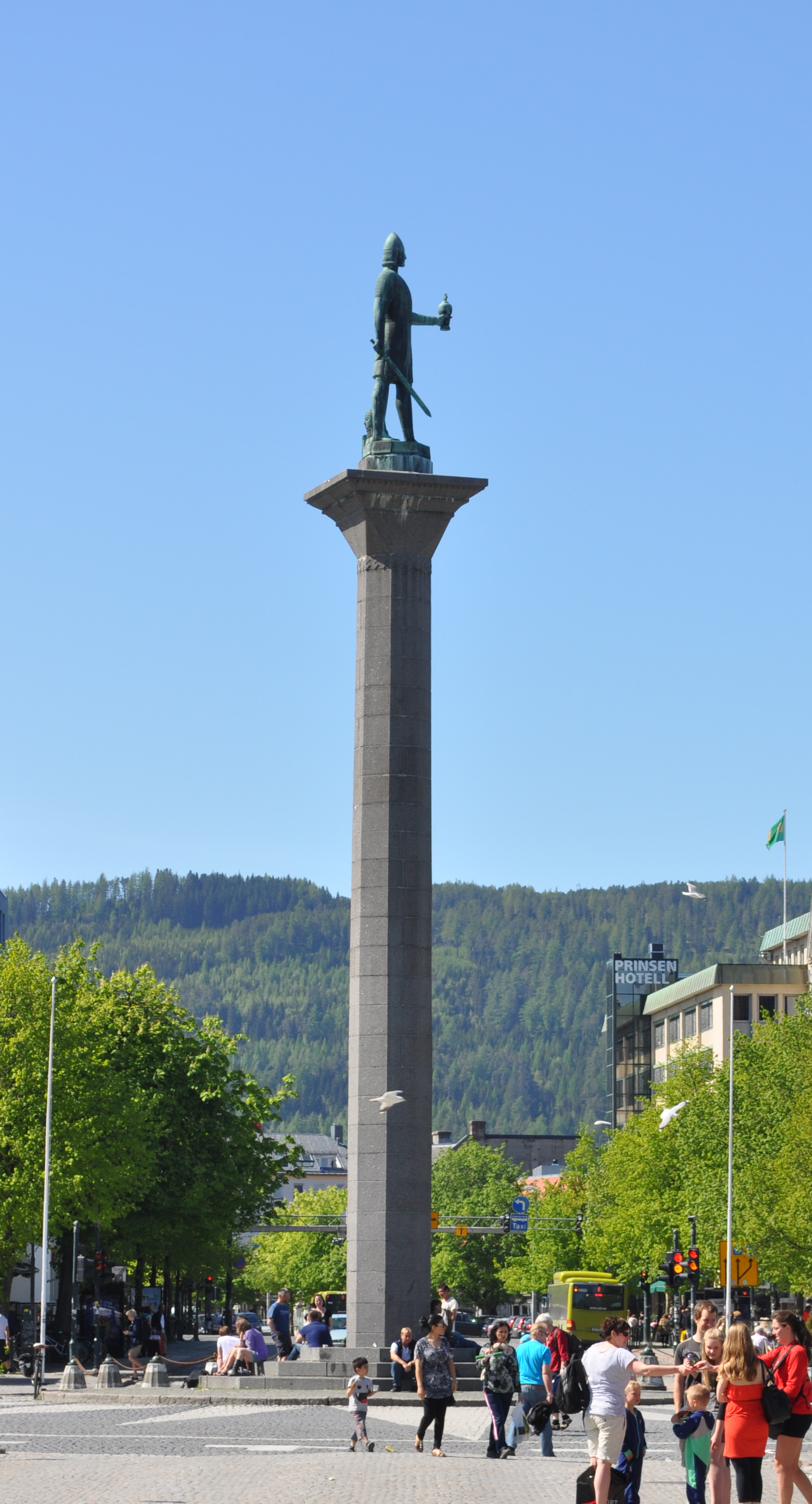
Makoto Yukimura (left) was influenced by Olaf Tryggvason to write a story about slaves which was the original focus of the manga.

Makoto Yukimura created Vinland Saga to convey that violence does not lead to positive outcomes. The protagonist, Thorfinn, was designed to evolve from an aggressive teenager into a mature individual, embodying the writer's personal aspirations. One of Yukimura's initial concepts was a story about a slave, inspired by King Olaf Tryggvason, who regained his throne after being enslaved. However, Yukimura conceived Thorfinn as facing greater hardships than Tryggvason, intending for him to learn about oppression and human suffering. The author later noted that Thorfinn lacked notable skills or an imposing physique, so his main character's distinction came from his experience of human pain. While Thorfinn's appearance evolved across the series' four arcs, Yukimura focused intently on his psychological development. Following editorial feedback, the protagonist was re-envisioned as a Viking, a change Yukimura accepted as it allowed Thorfinn to later understand the tragedies he caused. Yukimura found it challenging to draw the Slave Arc because of the impact it would have on readers.

Yukimura began serializing Vinland Saga in Kodansha's Weekly Shōnen Magazine in April 2005. After a two-month hiatus, the series transferred in late December 2005 to Kodansha's seinen magazine Monthly Afternoon, a move prompted by Yukimura's inability to maintain a weekly schedule. For illustrations and fight sequences, Yukimura visualized them mentally before drawing, citing Battle Angel Alita and its creator Yukito Kishiro as major influences. He typically worked with three assistants for nearly twelve hours a day, aiming to produce 30-page chapters. Some techniques required 18-hour workdays, and he maintained a pace of one completed page per day, acknowledging that intense competition in the manga industry resulted in high-quality work. Yukimura initially projected a 10-year completion timeline, later revising it to 14 years with an estimated 20 volumes across four parts. This estimate later expanded to over 22 volumes, and Yukimura expressed uncertainty about when he would reach the Vinland arc, often struggling with the story's direction. Due to COVID-19 pandemic restrictions, Yukimura transitioned to fully digital artwork from chapter 168, though he continued inking by hand before scanning and digitally finishing the pages.

Yukimura structured the series into four story arcs: the War arc, the Slave arc, the Eastern Expedition arc, and the Vinland arc. In November 2019, he announced the manga had entered its final arc, which he expected to span more than 50 chapters and 1,000 pages, taking several years to complete.

=== Influences ===
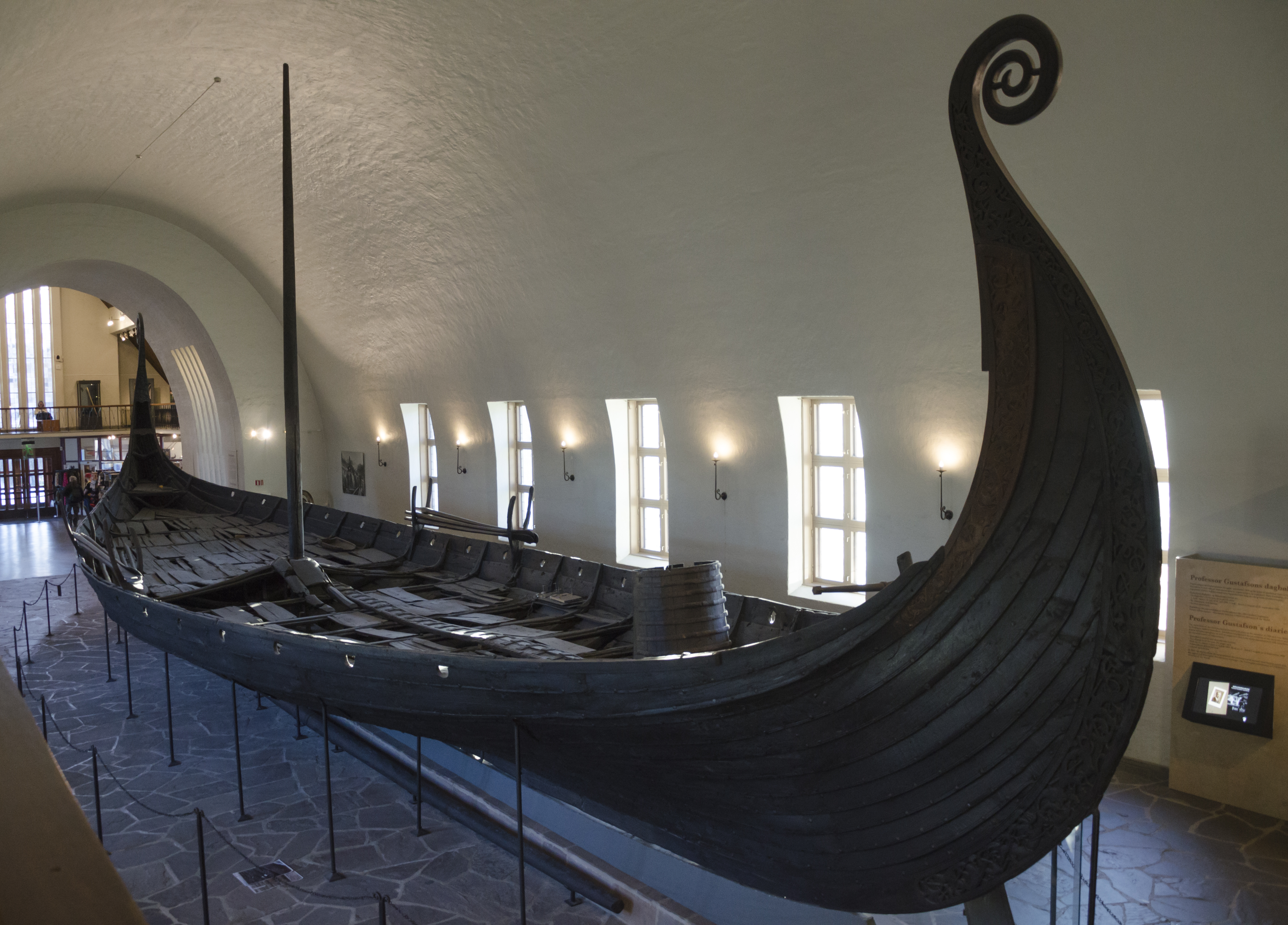
An example of an Osebergskipet ship which Askeladd's group use in the series' first story arc

Although the manga draws from the Saga of Erik the Red and the Saga of the Greenlanders, Yukimura found their length challenging to read in full. His research included a trip to Canada for artistic inspiration. Yukimura's fascination with Vikings began with anime he watched as a child, and he was intrigued by aspects of their culture, such as lenient sentences for crimes committed while intoxicated. A 2003 research trip to Scandinavia was complicated by a language barrier, as he spoke no Norwegian and little English. He described the Oseberg Ship as the most beautiful he had ever seen. Yukimura compared Vikings more to wokou than to samurai, noting Vikings were more expressive and free, whereas samurai were quiet and bound by obedience to their master or honor. He also conducted research in Denmark, Iceland, France, Britain, and Canada, and constructed full-scale models to ensure realism, though this process was time-consuming.

While depicting Vikings as heroes, Yukimura also aimed to portray the era's harsh realities. Consequently, Thorfinn was drawn with a serious expression in the first arc and grappled with his sins in the second. To balance the tone, the character Thorkell was made more comical. Editors advised against giving Canute a beard, fearing it would undermine his bishōnen appeal, but Yukimura insisted on historical accuracy. Conversely, although Thorfinn matured in the second arc, he was depicted clean-shaven to avoid an overtly strong appearance.

Yukimura's interest was piqued by the historical Thorfinn, and the scarcity of information about him allowed for creative freedom. He considered the dynamic between Thorfinn and Askeladd well-executed, with Askeladd becoming an ambiguous character due to his multifaceted portrayal. Most characters were written as figures Thorfinn relies on, with Askeladd—his mentor and enemy—as the exception. Parenting emerged as a recurring theme, exemplified by Askeladd guiding the young Thorfinn. The relationship between Einar and Thorfinn was also complex, as they were often unable to help one another, and Yukimura explored the consequences of revenge. Canute was created as Thorfinn's foil to represent differing values.

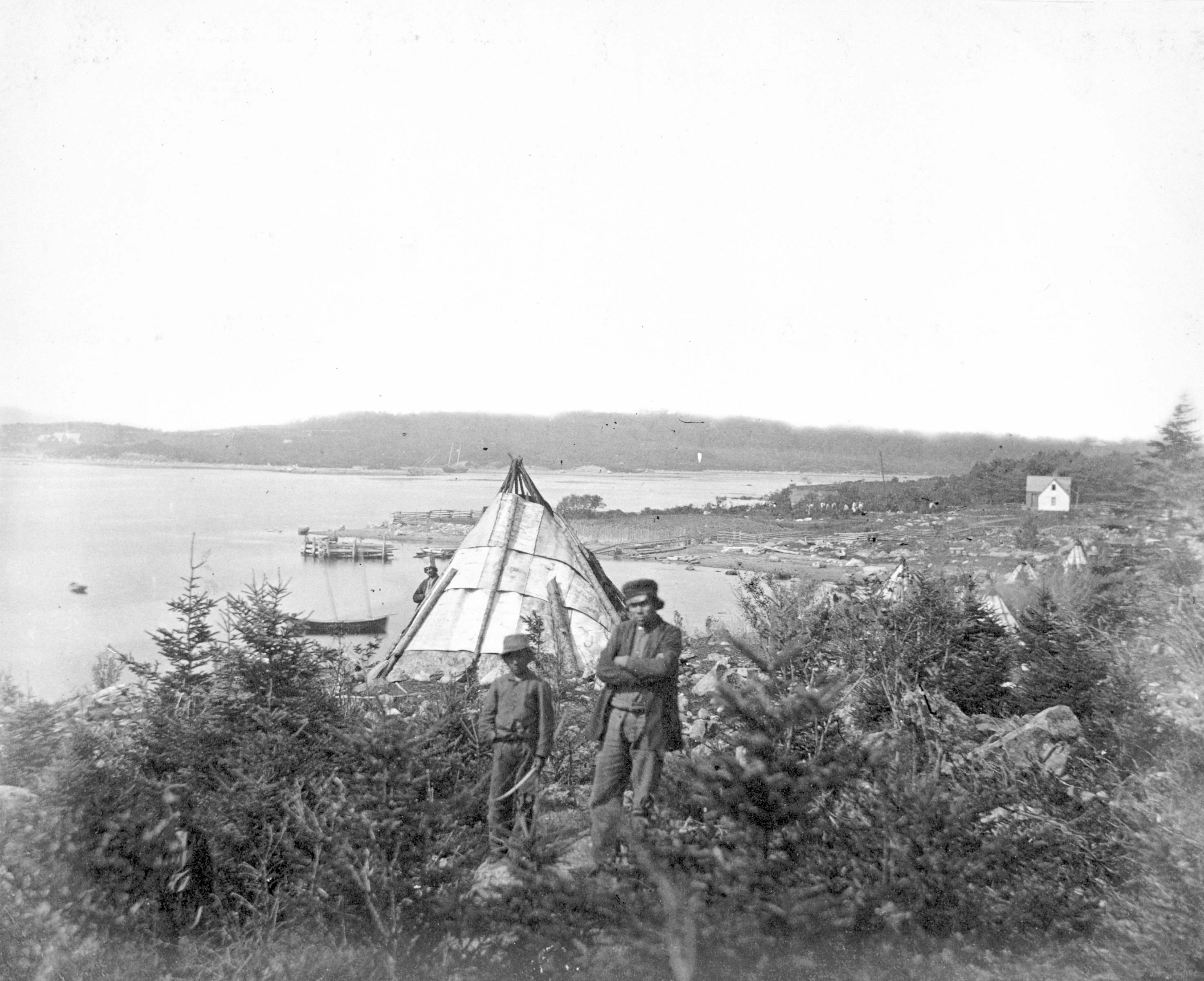
Research about the Mi'kmaq was made for the final arc.

Several characters were based on historical figures. While the historical Leif Erikson was a famous Norseman, Yukimura depicted him as a strong adventurer rather than a warrior. The author noted the series' prominence of male characters, with female characters often receiving little screen time or dying. A key exception was Gudrid, based on the historical figure who significantly impacted Thorfinn's life, an event Yukimura aimed to portray faithfully. The character Hild was created to remind Thorfinn of his past sins, mirroring his initial quest for revenge against Askeladd.

The final arc, set in Vinland, features the Mi'kmaq people. Their depiction was guided by Beverly Jedore and Yolanda Denny of the educational organization Miꞌkmaw Kinaꞌmatnewey. Linguist Bernie Francis assisted with the use of the Miꞌkmaq language, specifically the Francis-Smith orthography used by the Mi'kmaq Grand Council. These Mi'kmaq characters were inspired by the folktale "Muwinskw" ("The Little Bear"). Yukimura appreciated the tale's theme of coexisting with nature, which contrasted with the tragic fate the historical Thorfinn met in Vinland. The author expressed internal conflict over whether to adhere to history or provide a more hopeful conclusion for his fictional Thorfinn.

=== Themes ===
In a 2008 interview, Yukimura stated that reading Fist of the North Star as a boy inspired him to become a manga artist and to create a series exploring themes of "strength and justice". He expressed that holding ideals is essential for a prosperous life. Although Kenshiro was portrayed as a hero in Fist of the North Star, Yukimura was dissatisfied with some of his actions in the setting and believed that he could have improved society. This inspired Yukimura to create Vinland Saga. The slaves were portrayed as the powerless opposites of the Vikings; Yukimura believed they were the era's sole proponents of justice and opposition to domination. Dissatisfied with his handling of themes about love and ways of living in his previous work, Planetes, Yukimura revisited these ideas in Vinland Saga. The quest for redemption and pacifism began when Thorfinn realized the damage he had caused as a Viking. This theme developed alongside the supporting character Hild, who wanted to kill Thorfinn for revenge. After writing several chapters involving these two characters, Yukimura was pleased to write about Hild's forgiveness.

Despite the series' violent content, Yukimura stated he dislikes violence and wrote the story by setting aside his modern morality. The Vikings were depicted as admired for their strength but also as individuals susceptible to betrayal. Following several violent storylines, the narrative shifted toward themes of healing and forgiveness. Yukimura's anxieties during the Cold War and after the September 11 attacks influenced Thorfinn's character, who becomes traumatized by his violent past and seeks to establish Vinland as a peaceful, multiracial society. Upon the series' conclusion, Yukimura stated his goal was to explore whether Thorfinn could become a truly kind person and what it means to mature into a proper adult, defining the goal of growth as becoming a "kind person".

== Media ==
=== Manga ===
Written and illustrated by Makoto Yukimura, Vinland Saga was first serialized in Kodansha's shōnen manga magazine Weekly Shōnen Magazine from April 13 to October 5, 2005. (Note: It finished in the magazine's 45th issue of 2005 (cover date October 19), released on October 5 of that same year.) It was transferred to Kodansha's seinen manga magazine Monthly Afternoon, starting on December 24, 2005. The series finished after 20 years of publication on July 25, 2025. Kodansha collected its chapters in 29 tankōbon (bound volumes), with the first volume released on July 15, 2005. The first two volumes were initially released under the Shōnen Magazine Comics imprint, and then reissued under the Afternoon KC imprint after the manga's serialization switch. The final volume was released on September 22, 2025.

The series is licensed for an English release in North America by Kodansha USA, which released it in a two-in-one hardcover edition. The first volume was published on October 14, 2013, and the fifteenth and final volume was published on October 13, 2026. During their panel at Anime NYC 2022, Kodansha USA announced that they would release a three-in-one hardcover deluxe edition of the series. The first volume was released on February 6, 2024.

=== Anime ===
A 24-episode anime television series adaptation, produced by Twin Engine, Production I.G, Wit Studio and Kodansha, was broadcast on NHK General TV from July 8 to December 30, 2019. Amazon streamed the series worldwide on its Prime Video service. Sentai Filmworks released the series on home video on August 31, 2021, with both a new translation and English dub. MVM Entertainment licensed the series in the United Kingdom and Ireland.

A second 24-episode season, animated by MAPPA, was broadcast on Tokyo MX, BS11, and GBS from January 10 to June 20, 2023. (Note: Tokyo MX listed the series premiere January 9 at 24:30, which is effectively January 10 at 12:30 a.m. JST.) The second season was simulcast globally on both Netflix and Crunchyroll (excluding China, South Korea and Japan).

=== Stage plays ===
The stage play adaptations of the manga, titled Vinland Saga the Stage: At the End of the End of the Ocean (舞台 ヴィンランド・サガ 〜海の果の果ー辺〜, Butai Vinrando Saga Umi no Hate no Hate-hen) and Vinland Saga the Stage: Revival of the Hero (舞台 ヴィンランド・サガ 〜英雄復活篇〜, Butai Vinrando Saga Eiyū Fukkatsu-hen), ran concurrently in Tokyo from April 19–29, 2024. The plays are directed and written by Daisuke Nishida. The cast includes Shohei Hashimoto as Thorfinn, Ryō Kitamura as Canute, Takeshi Hayashino as Thorkell, Ryoko Isogai as Bjorn, and Takashi Hagino as Askeladd.

=== Other media ===
Yukimura drew a seven-page crossover manga chapter between the series and the Assassin's Creed Valhalla video game that was uploaded to Ubisoft's website on October 23, 2020. A supplementary book, Vinland Saga Official Guidebook (ヴィンランド・サガ 公式ガイドブック, Vinrando Saga Kōshiki Gaidobukku), was released by Kodansha on July 23, 2019.

== Reception ==
=== Sales ===
Vinland Saga has been commercially successful in Japan, with combined sales of 1.2 million copies for the first five volumes by June 2008. It had over 5 million copies in print by 2018. Several volumes have appeared on the Taiyosha top ten best-selling manga list. By August 2022, the manga had over 7 million copies in circulation.

=== Critical reception ===
Even before its international release, Vinland Saga attracted attention and praise from the international manga community. In 2006, The Comics Journal included Vinland Saga in a list of worthwhile manga from scanlation groups. Critics praised Vinland Saga for its fluid action sequences, remarking how well author Yukimura made the transition to the action genre from his previous work Planetes. Criticism was, however, levelled at the extent of suspension of disbelief in a historical fiction series. Upon its official release, the first volume was reviewed by Rebecca Silverman for Anime News Network. She described it as a "deeply engrossing book" and praised it for its attention to detail and "excellent period detail" in its depiction of medieval times, though expressed disappointment at the lack of interesting female characters. Johanna Draper Carlson of Comics Worth Reading described the action in the first volume as "fast-paced, well-illustrated, and detailed" but "didn't transcend its premise"; she was instead more impressed by the scenes depicting family life, saying "that's where the insightful character work I expected from Yukimura came through." Carlson also praised the scenes depicting domestic life as providing grounding context for the story, as well as weaving in religion and politics, finding Vinland Saga "a fascinating read on multiple levels". In The European Middle Ages through the prism of Contemporary Japanese Literature, Maximen Denise from University of Tours noted how the lack of proper knowledge about the real life of Thorfinn in The Greenlanders and Eric the Red made Yukimura come across with a more original background for how the main character becomes a Viking during his youth, giving him a realistic characterization which contrasts with Thorkell's supernatural strength. According to the writer, while Thorfinn is originally driven by revenge, the manga also explores his desire for power, similar to "those who desperately struggle to find their homelands in the 21st century 'medieval' Japan".

Following the end of the first story arc, critics were surprised by Thorfinn's quieter personality and noted that despite his life as a slave, the plot manages to make his life with other slaves interesting. The romantic relationship between Thorfinn and Gudrid surprised Manga News, though they still appreciated the handling of their wedding ceremony, which gave the narrative a lighter tone for a famously dark series. Manga Sanctuary agreed, finding Thorfinn to live up to his father's legacy during his quest while finding his newfound family appealing, not only including his wife Gudrid, but also his adopted son who often defends him.

In regards to the art, Silverman initially felt it was "a bit generic shounen", but praised the improvement of the art during the Slave arc. The panel composition, realistically barbaric violence, and attention to detail in constructing the setting were highlighted and compared with those found in Kentaro Miura's long-running series Berserk. The return of action scenes in the Merchant arc was praised by Manga News for showing how detailed Yukimura's art can be.

Other manga authors have commented on Vinland Saga. Attack on Titan author Hajime Isayama said that Thorfinn is his favorite character from Vinland Saga due to his humanity and guilt. In particular, he enjoyed how the manga went from the action story to a calmer take when Thorfinn becomes a slave as it helps him to form a notable character arc when he lets go of his violent days in favor of a redemption quest. Writer Hiroshi Seko believes Thorfinn's age and role in a story of Vikings to be one of the best reasons for the series' popularity. Golden Kamuy artist Satoru Noda praised Yukimura's artwork for how the manga already starts depicting Nordic elements alongside backgrounds. In regards to characters, Noda particularly enjoyed Askeladd due to his notable skills as well as cruel, and merciless traits.

Yukimura recalls receiving several negative responses from the fans after the ending of the first story arc as Thorfinn is no longer portrayed as a Viking and instead spends the time farming. He apologized to the readers for such change, but he still finds it impossible to return the series to its violent topics, so he told the fanbase to consider the manga Attack on Titan for its focus on violence.

=== Accolades ===
The manga was nominated for the 1st Manga Taisho award in 2008. Vinland Saga was awarded the Grand Prize of the Manga Division at the 13th Japan Media Arts Festival in 2009; it was also a Jury Recommended work at the 25th edition in 2022. It won the 36th Kodansha Manga Award for Best General Manga in 2012.
