= Snorri =

- Gender: Male

Origin
- Language: Old Norse
- Origin: Snerra
- Meaning: Onslaught

Snorri (Old Norse pronunciation: [ˈsnorːe]; Icelandic pronunciation: [ˈstnɔrːɪ]) is a masculine given name. People with the name include:

- Snorri Einarsson (born 1986), Norwegian-Icelandic cross-country skier
- Snorri Goði or Snorri Þorgrímsson (963–1031), a prominent chieftain in Western Iceland, featured in a number of Icelandic sagas
- Snorri Guðjónsson (born 1981), an Icelandic handball player
- Snorri Helgason (born 1984), Icelandic musician
- Snorri Hjartarson (1906–1986), an Icelandic poet and winner of the Nordic Council's Literature Prize
- Snorri Hergill Kristjánsson (born 1974), an Icelandic stand-up comedian based in London
- Snorri Magnússon (born 1964), Icelandic police officer
- Snorri Másson (born 1997), Icelandic podcaster and politician
- Snorri Snorrason (born 1977), an Icelandic singer who rose to popularity after winning the Icelandic version of Pop Idol
- Snorri Sturluson (1179–1241), an Icelandic historian, poet, and politician
- Snorri Thorfinnsson (1004–1090), son of the explorer Þorfinnr Karlsefni and Guðríðr Eiríksdóttir
- Snorri Þorbrandsson, a character in the Icelandic Eyrbyggja saga
