= Ásmundur Sveinsson =

Icelandic sculptor (1893–1982)

- Born: Ásmundur Sveinsson; 20 May 1893; Kolsstadir, Iceland
- Died: 9 December 1982 (aged 89); Reykjavík
- Known for: Sculpting
- Spouse: Gunnfríður Jónsdóttir m. 1924 Ingrid Sveinsson m. 1949

Ásmundur Sveinsson (20 May 1893 – 9 December 1982) was an Icelandic sculptor, whose works include "Thor's gavel", the ornate gavel used by the President of United Nations General Assembly.

== Early years ==
Ásmundur Sveinsson was born in Kolsstadir in West Iceland on 20 May 1893. In 1915 he moved to Reykjavík, where he enrolled in the Technical College of Iceland and apprenticed with sculptor Ríkarður Jónsson for four years. In 1919 he relocated to Copenhagen, Denmark, and from there to Stockholm, Sweden, where he enrolled in the Academy of Fine Arts, where he remained for six years, much of it spent studying with sculptor Carl Milles.

In 1924 he married sculptor Gunnfríður Jónsdóttir. He and Gunnfríður divorced several years later. After graduating from the Academy, Ásmundur moved to Paris, France where he continued his study, here under the sculptor Charles Despiau.

== Work ==
Ásmundur returned to Iceland in 1929 and began producing a series of abstracted figurative works. His themes were often men and women at work and included such pieces as The Blacksmith, The Washer Women, and The Water Carrier. During the 1940s Ásmundur's work moved even farther away from the human and animal form that had been his mainstay until then and by the 1950s he was producing work that was almost entirely abstract.

Like many Icelandic artists, he drew upon the traditions of his native country when seeking subjects to inspire him. In 1939, for example, Ásmundur's sculpture of Guðríðr Þorbjarnardóttir and her son Snorri was displayed at the New York World's Fair. Casts of his original smaller sculpture of the pair were later installed in Iceland, at both Glaumbær and Laugarbrekka, and gifted to the Canadian government and the Vatican. Other works of Ásmundur's drawing on Icelandic traditions include Trollwoman (1948), Head Ransom (1948), based on a poem that Egil Skallagrimsson purportedly composed to save his own head, and Hel-Ride (1944) taken from the Prose Edda of Snorri Sturlusson. His Sæmundur and the Seal, also in this vein, is situated in front of the main building of the University of Iceland in Reykjavík.

Generally, the artist believed in placing works of art not only in the hands of a small elite, but also in making them accessible to the public. Other works of Ásmundur Sveinsson are to be found on the hill Öskjuhlíð near Perlan in Reykjavík or at the farm of Borg á Mýrum near Borgarnes. The abstract sculpture here represents the saga hero Egill having his dead son in his arms. The title Sonartorrek is referring to a poem which Egill Skallagrimsson wrote about this scene. Ásmundur died in Reykjavík on 9 December 1982. In 2015, his statue of poet Einar Benediktsson was moved to a spot near Höfði house in Reykjavik, where the poet had lived.

== Ásmundarsafn ==
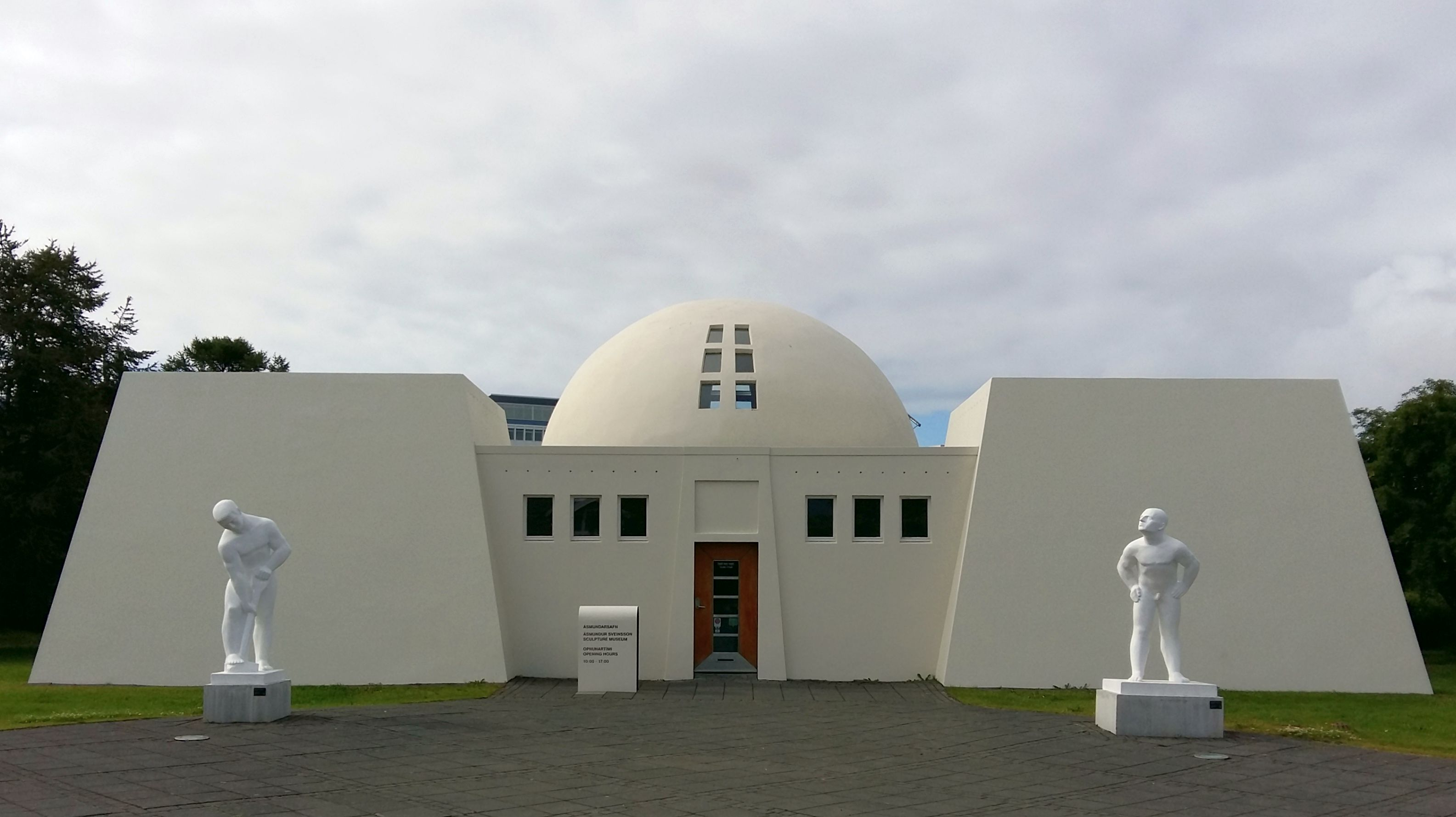
Ásmundarsafn

The former house of the artist in Laugardalur, Reykjavík, has been turned into a museum, called Ásmundarsafn. The house was constructed from 1942 until ca. 1958 in three parts, based on designs drawn by the artistm who was a fan of the Bauhaus style. He lived there through most of his life with his second wife, Ingrid Sveinsson. The house is slightly reminiscent of Le Corbusier and his chapel of Ronchamp. The sculpture garden nearby is open to public.

== See also ==
- List of Icelandic visual artists
- Reykjavik Art Museum
