= Vinland sagas =

13th century Icelandic texts

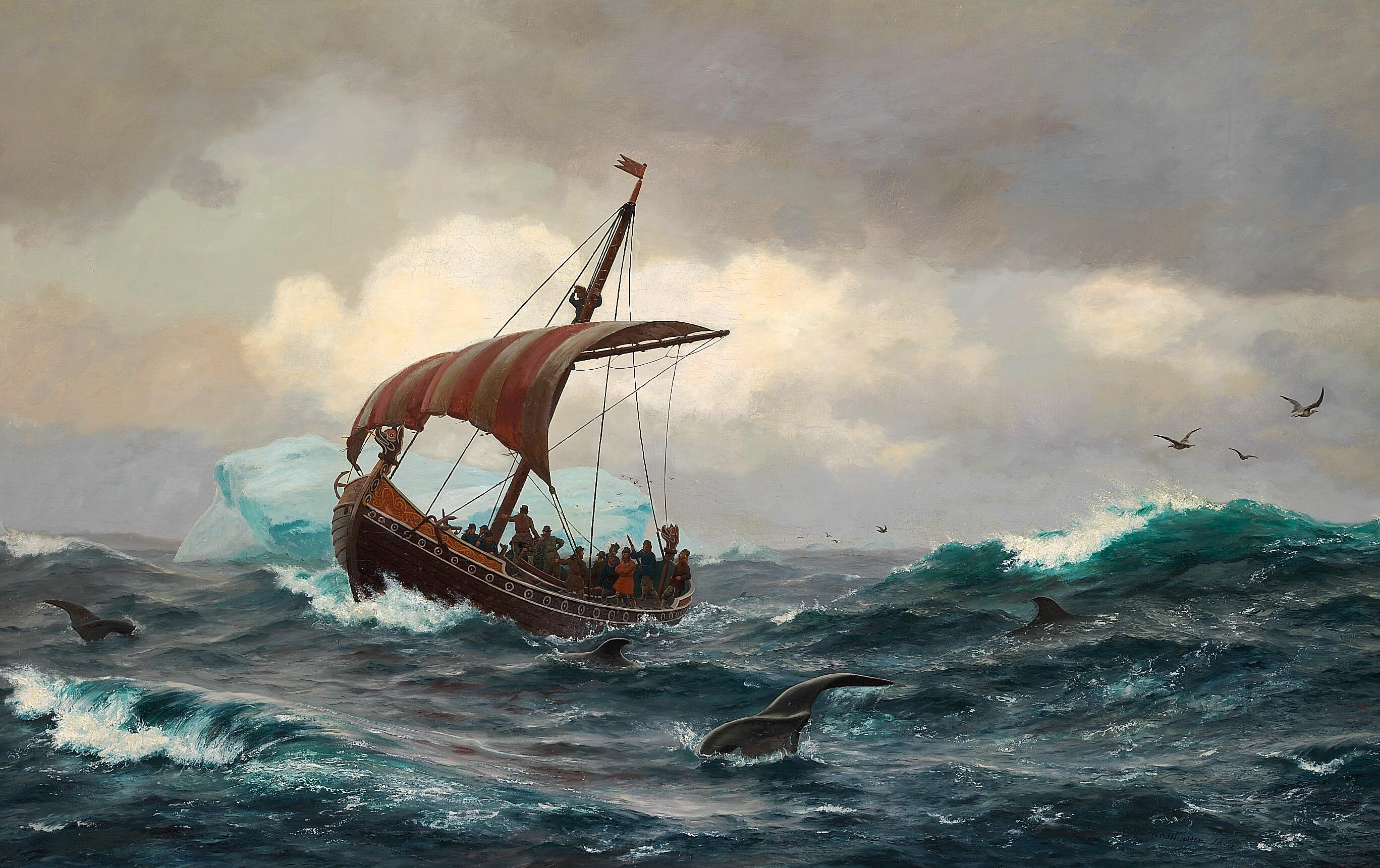
Summer in the Greenland coast c.1000 by Carl Rasmussen

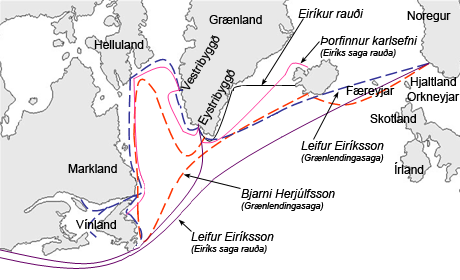
Possible routes traveled in Saga of Eric the Red and Saga of the Greenlanders

The Vinland sagas are two Icelandic texts written independently of each other in the early 13th century—the Saga of the Greenlanders (Grænlendinga Saga) and the Saga of Erik the Red (Eiríks Saga Rauða). The sagas were written down between 1220 and 1280 and describe events occurring around 970–1030.

The Saga of the Greenlanders and the Saga of Erik the Red both contain different accounts of Norse voyages to Vinland. The name Vinland, meaning 'Wineland', is attributed to the discovery of grapevines upon the arrival of Leif Erikson in North America. However, the translation of vin meaning wine is not the only possible origin; some scholars believe it refers to pasture or meadow. The Vinland sagas represent the most complete information available regarding the Norse exploration of the Americas, although due to Iceland's oral tradition, they cannot be deemed completely historically accurate and include contradictory details, such as who first sighted land, as well as the number of voyages taken. Nevertheless, historians commonly believe these sources contain substantial evidence of Viking exploration of North America through the descriptions of topography, natural resources, and Indigenous cultures, despite their embellishments. In comparing the events of both texts, a realistic timeline can be created. Today these texts are viewed as accounts of family exploration led by the children of Erik the Red. They give insights to the people and geography at the time.

== Geographical locations ==
The veracity of the sagas was supported by the discovery and excavation of a Viking Age settlement in Newfoundland, Canada. Research done in the early 1960s by Norwegian explorer Helge Ingstad and his wife, archaeologist Anne Stine Ingstad, identified this settlement located at what is now the L'Anse aux Meadows National Historic Site of Canada, dating approximately 1000 A.D.

Rather than a complete colony, the settlement found in L'Anse aux Meadows appears to have been a specialized winter base camp used to repair boats and to obtain resources such as timber and grapes. The site layout suggests a society of approximately 70 to 90 people, with structures indicative of all different statuses; high, mid, and low, including servants.

While L'Anse aux Meadows has been identified as Norse settlement, there is ongoing debate whether L'Anse aux Meadows was truly Vinland. It has been suggested that the butternuts, wild grapes, and the wheat mentioned in the sagas correspond more accurately to the environment of Nova Scotia, New Brunswick, or in the Gulf of St. Lawrence regions. Though, it is difficult to confirm with complete accuracy as the butternuts today lack the flesh that they once had, also, it is impossible to obtain samples of the butternuts of that time period.

== Contact with Indigenous Peoples ==
The Norse interacted and traded with the Indigenous peoples of Eastern Canada. The Indigenous groups approached the Norse requesting to trade furs for weapons, but the Norse traded them milk and cloth instead of weapons. Due to an attempted theft of their weapons, according to the Greenlanders saga, an Indigenous person was killed; starting a conflict which the Norse decided to abstain from, choosing to leave Vinland.

== Family relations ==
=== Lineage of Erik the Red ===
In the lineage of Erik the Red, Thorvald Asvaldsson was Erik's father. Asvlad was Erik's grandfather, Ulf was his great grandfather, and Oxen-Thorir was his great-great grandfather.

Erik went on to marry Thjodhild who was the daughter of Jorund and Thorbjorg Shipbreast.

Erik had four children, three legitimate sons with Thjodhild and one illegitimate daughter. His sons were Leif Erikson, Thorvald, and Thorstein. His daughter, Freydis, was described as a prominent, controversial figure in the expeditions to Vinland.

Erik's son, Leif, had an illegitimate son named Thorgils, who was born to Thorgunna in the Hebrides.

=== Lineage of Gudrid and Thorfinn Karlsefni ===
Gudrid Thorbjarnardóttir was the daughter of Thorbjorn Vifilsson, a Norwegian chieftain, and was married three times.

Her first marriage was to a Norwegian named Thorir, who died in Greenland. The second was to Thorstein Eiriksson, the son of Erik the Red, who also died in Greenland. Her third husband was Thorfinn Karlsefni, whom she led a major expedition to Vinland with.

Thorfinn Karlsefni was the son of Thord Horsehead. While in Vinland, Gudrid and Thorfinn had a son, Snorri Thorfinnsson.

== Translations ==
English translations of both of the Vinland sagas can be found in the following works:

- Reeves, Arthur Middleton, The Finding of Wineland the Good: The History of the Icelandic Discovery of America, London: Henry Frowde, Oxford University Press, 1890.
- Magnusson, Magnus; Palsson, Hermann, The Vinland Sagas, London: Penguin, 1973, ISBN 0-14-044154-9.
- Kunz, Keneva, The Sagas of the Icelanders, London: Penguin, 2005, ISBN 0-14-100003-1.
- Kunz, Keneva; Sigurdsson, Gisli, The Vinland Sagas, London: Penguin, 2008, ISBN 0-14-044776-8.
