= Saga of the Greenlanders =

Icelandic saga

Grœnlendinga saga (Old Norse pronunciation: [ˈgrøːnˌlendingɑ ˈsɑɣɑ]; Modern Icelandic: Grænlendinga saga, Icelandic pronunciation: [ˈkrainˌlɛntinka ˈsaːɣa], literally Saga of the Greenlanders), is one of the sagas of Icelanders. Like the Saga of Erik the Red, it is one of the two main sources on the Norse colonization of North America. Together, these sagas are known as the Vinland sagas. The saga recounts events that purportedly happened around 1000 and is preserved only in the late 14th century Flateyjarbók manuscript.

The Saga of the Greenlanders starts with Erik the Red, who leaves Norway and colonizes Greenland. It then relates six expeditions to North America, led respectively by Bjarni Herjolfsson, Leif Erikson, Thorvald Eriksson, Thorstein Eriksson and his wife Gudrid Thorbjarnardóttir, Thorfinn Karlsefni, and Freydís Eiríksdóttir. Bjarni and his crew discover three lands by chance during their voyage to Greenland, but they never set foot on the lands themselves. Leif learns about Bjarni's encounters and, after buying Bjarni's ship, sails to the lands to explore them. During his adventures, Leif names the three lands Helluland, Markland, and Vinland. Later, Thorvald, Leif's brother, sets sail to Vinland and lives there until he gets killed by the natives in a combat. Thorstein and Gudrid attempt to travel to Vinland but eventually fail, and thereafter Thorstein dies of an illness. Karlsefni, who then marries Gudrid, journeys to Vinland and stays there until the following spring. The final expedition is made by Freydís, who sails to Vinland with the brothers Helgi and Finnbogi but eventually slaughters their crew and returns to Greenland.

The date of the saga's composition has been debated among scholars for decades. Some have argued that the saga was written around the beginning of the 13th century, while others have dated it to the late 13th century or even the 14th century. Attempts have also been made to determine the credibility of the different expedition stories in the saga, and they often involve close comparisons between the Saga of the Greenlanders and the Saga of Erik the Red. The current consensus is that although certain parts of the saga are fanciful, much appears to be based on historical truth.

== Synopsis ==
=== Norse colonization of Greenland ===
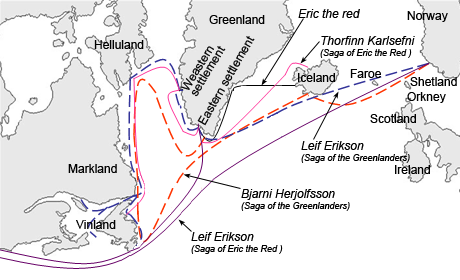
Graphical description of the different sailing routes to Greenland, Vinland (Newfoundland), Helluland (Baffin Island), and Markland (Labrador) travelled by different Viking characters in the Icelandic Sagas, primarily the Saga of Erik the Red and Saga of the Greenlanders.

Erik the Red emigrates from Norway to Iceland with his father, Thorvald Asvaldsson, to avoid murder charges. Erik marries Thjodhild in Iceland. He again is involved in a dispute and is proclaimed an outlaw. He resolves to find the land spotted by Gunnbjorn while lost during a western voyage.

Erik departs Iceland near Snæfellsjökull and arrives at the glacial coast of Greenland where he then sails south searching for habitable areas. After two years of exploring, he returns to Iceland and tells of his discoveries, giving Greenland its name as a way to attract settlers.

Overwintering in Iceland, Erik sets sail again intending to colonize Greenland. His expedition has 30 ships, but only 14 reach their destination. Erik founds a colony at Brattahlid in the Southwest of the island where he becomes a respected leader. Erik and Thjodhild have three sons, Leif, Thorvald, and Thorstein, and a daughter named Freydis.

=== Bjarni's voyage ===
A man named Bjarni Herjólfsson has the custom of spending alternate winters in Norway and in Iceland with his father. When he arrives in Iceland one summer, he finds that his father has emigrated to Greenland. He resolves to follow him there although he realizes that it is a dangerous proposition since neither he nor any of his crew has been in Greenland waters.

After sailing for three days from Iceland, Bjarni receives unfavorable weather, north winds, and fog and loses his bearing. After several days of bad weather, the sun shines again, and Bjarni reaches a wooded land. Realizing that it is not Greenland, Bjarni decides not to go ashore and sets sail away. Bjarni finds two more lands, but neither of them matches the descriptions he has heard of Greenland, and therefore, despite the curiosity of his sailors, he does not go ashore. Eventually the ship does reach Greenland and Bjarni settles in Herjolfsnes.

The description of Bjarni's voyage is unique to the Saga of the Greenlanders. Bjarni is not mentioned in the Saga of Erik the Red which gives Leif the credit for the discoveries.

=== Leif's expedition ===
Leif Eriksson becomes interested in Bjarni's discoveries and buys a ship from him. He hires a crew of 35 people and asks Erik to lead an expedition to the West. Erik is reluctant and says he is too old, but he is eventually persuaded. As Erik rides to the ship, his horse stumbles, and Erik falls to the ground and hurts his foot. Considering this an ill omen, he says: "It is not ordained that I should discover more countries than that which we now inhabit." Leif, instead, leads the expedition.

Setting sail from Brattahlid, Leif and his crew find the same lands Bjarni has discovered earlier but in the reverse order. First they come upon an icy land. They step ashore and find it to be of little interest. Leif names the country Helluland meaning Stone-slab land. They then sail further and find a forested land with white shores. Leif names it Markland meaning Wood land and again sets sail.

Leif sails for two days with a north-easterly wind and comes upon a new land which appears very inviting. They decide to stay there for the winter.

The nature of the country was, as they thought, so good that cattle would not require house feeding in winter, for there came no frost in winter, and little did the grass wither there. Day and night were more equal than in Greenland or Iceland.
— Beamish (1864), p.64

As Leif and his crew explore the land, they discover grapes. Leif therefore names the country Vinland meaning Wine land. In the spring, the expedition sets sail back to Greenland with a ship loaded with wood and grapes. During the voyage home, they come upon and rescue a group of ship-wrecked Norsemen. After this Leif is called Leif the Lucky.

=== Thorvald's expedition ===
Leif's voyage is discussed extensively in Brattahlid. Thorvald, Leif's brother, thinks that Vinland has not been explored enough. Leif offers him his ship for a new voyage there and he accepts. Setting sail with a crew of 30, Thorvald arrives in Vinland where Leif has previously made camp. They stay there for the winter and survive by fishing.

In the spring Thorvald goes exploring and sails to the west. They find no signs of human habitation except for one corn-shed. They return to their camp for the winter. The next summer Thorvald makes explorations in the east and north of their camp. At one point the explorers disembark in a pleasant forested area.

[Thorvald] then said: "Here it is beautiful, and here would I like to raise my dwelling." Then went they to the ship, and saw upon the sands within the promontory three elevations, and went thither, and saw there three skin boats (canoes), and three men under each. Then divided they their people, and caught them all, except one, who got away with his boat. They killed the other eight, and then went back to the cape, and looked round them, and saw some heights inside of the firth, and supposed that these were dwellings. — Beamish (1864), p.71

The natives, called Skraelings by the Norsemen, return with a larger force to attack Thorvald and his men. The Skraelings fire missiles at them for a while and then retreat. Thorvald receives a fatal wound and is buried in Vinland. His crew returns to Greenland.

=== Thorstein ===
Thorstein Eriksson resolves to go to Vinland for the body of his brother. The same ship is prepared yet again, and Thorstein sets sail with a crew of 25 and his wife Gudrid. The expedition never reaches Vinland, and after sailing the whole summer, the ship ends up back at the coast of Greenland. During the winter, Thorstein falls ill and dies but speaks out of his dead body and tells the fortune of his wife Gudrid. He predicts that Gudrid will marry an Icelander and have a long line of "promising, bright and fine, sweet and well-scented" descendants. Thorstein also predicts that she will leave Greenland for Norway and from there she will set out for Iceland. She will, however, live so long that she will outlive her husband. Thorstein foresees that once her husband passes she will travel abroad once again, going south on a pilgrimage, and then return to her farm in Iceland. Upon her return a church will be built, and she will become a nun and remain there until her death.

=== Karlsefni's expedition ===
A ship commanded by Thorfinn Karlsefni, a man of means, arrives in Greenland from Norway. He stays with Leif Eriksson for the winter and falls in love with Gudrid Thorbjarnardóttir. They marry later that same winter. Karlsefni is encouraged by his wife and other people to lead an expedition to Vinland. He agrees to go and hires a crew of sixty men and five women. The expedition arrives in Leif's and Thorvald's old camp and stays there for the winter in good conditions.

The next summer, a group of Skraelings come to visit, carrying skins for trade. The Skraelings want weapons in return but Karlsefni forbids his men to trade weapons. Instead he offers the Skraelings dairy products, and the trade is successful.

Near the beginning of their second winter, the Skraelings come again to trade. This time, one of Karlsefni's men kills a Skraeling as he reaches for Norse weapons. The Skraelings run off. Karlsefni fears that the natives will return, hostile and in larger numbers. He forms a plan for the coming battle. The Skraelings do come again and the Norsemen manage to fight them off. Karlsefni stays there for the remainder of the winter and returns to Greenland the following spring. During their stay in Vinland, Karlsefni and Gudrid have their son, Snorri.

=== Freydis's expedition ===
Freydís Eiríksdóttir, daughter of Erik the Red, proposes a voyage to Vinland with the brothers Helgi and Finnbogi, offering to share the profits fifty-fifty. After the brothers agree to the proposal, Freydis turns to her brother Leif as she wishes to have the houses he built in Vinland. Leif says she may borrow them, but she cannot have them for herself.

The agreement between Freydis and the brothers is that each party can have no more than 30 men on board and then women as well. This agreement is made to ensure that neither side has an unfair advantage against the other, but Freydis quickly double-crosses her partners by bringing along 5 extra men.

The brothers arrive at Vinland slightly earlier and unload their belongings into Leif's house. When Freydis realized what they have done, she immediately makes them remove their things. The brothers therefore build their own longhouse. After a winter of small disputes, Freydis arises early one morning to speak with the brothers. Finnbogi is the only one awake, and he steps out to hear what Freydis has to say.

Finnbogi explains his dislike for the ill feelings between the two parties and hopes to clear the air with Freydis. She agrees and offers a trade. The brothers want to stay in Vinland, but Freydis is ready to go back home; she suggests they trade ships since the brothers have a much larger one than she does, and it would be of better use bringing back her people and her half of the profits. Finnbogi agrees to this, and the two part.

Once Freydis returns home, her cold, wet feet awake her husband, Thorvard. He asks where she has been, and she spins a tale much different from the actual events that have taken place. She says that she offered to buy the brother's ship, but they became angry and struck her. Freydis then threatens divorce until Thorvard agrees to avenge her.

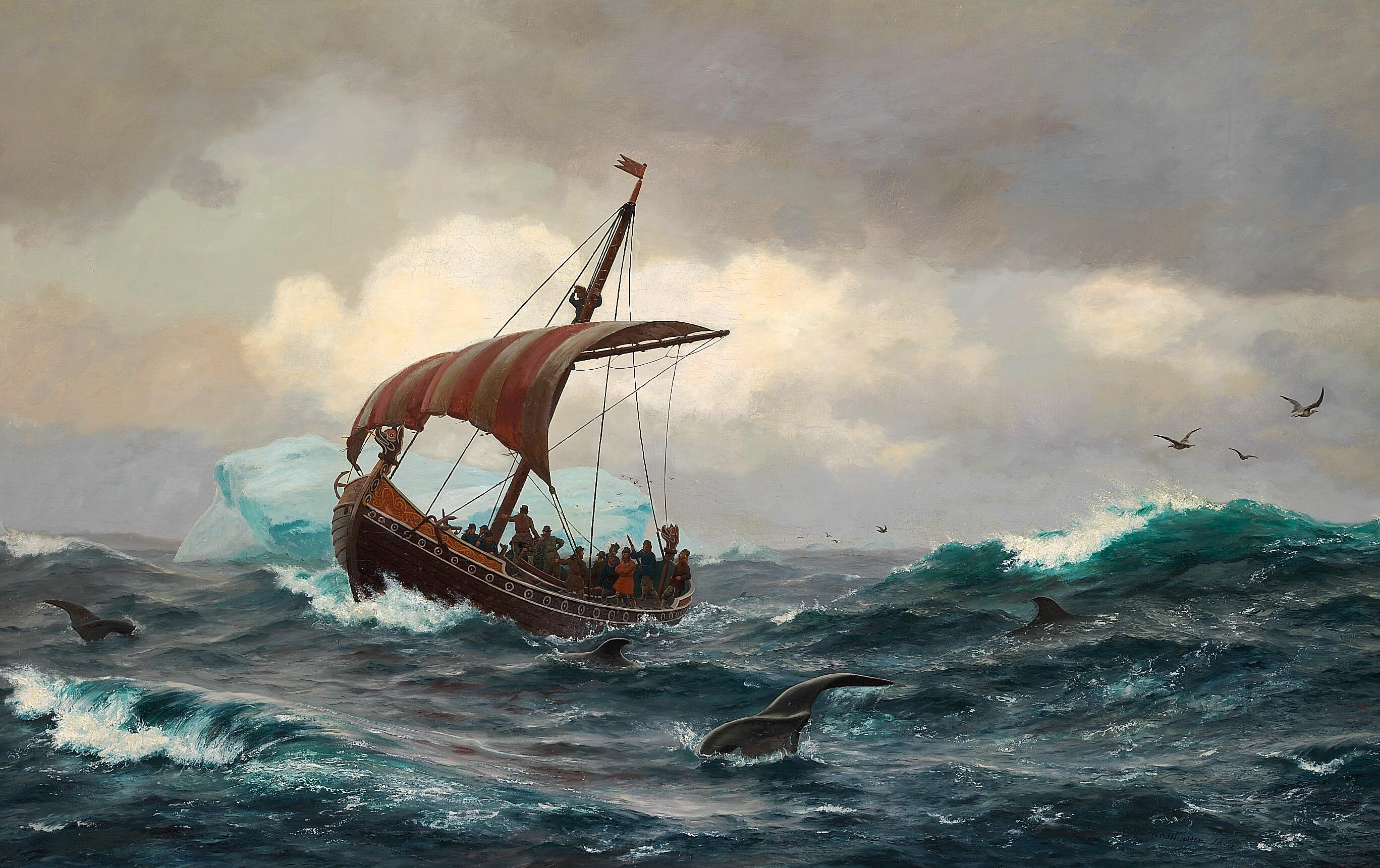
Summer on the Greenland coast circa year 1000 by Carl Rasmussen

Thorvard takes his men and begins tying up all the men from the other camp in a sneak attack while they are still sleeping. Freydis has each man killed on the spot if they belong to Finnbogi and Helgi's crew. Soon, only the 5 women are left alive, but no man dares to kill them. In response Freydis says, "Hand me an axe." She makes quick work of slaying the women and is very pleased with how well her morning has gone. She tells all involved that anyone who speaks a word of the events will be killed. The plan is to say that the brothers chose to stay behind in Vinland when Freydis returns to Greenland.

Once back home, Freydis returns to the farm and ensures that her crew is well rewarded for the trip to Vinland in order to keep them quiet about her dastardly deeds. Nevertheless, Leif eventually catches wind of what has happened and gets furious. He predicts "that their descendants will not get on well in this world."

=== End of the saga ===
Karlsefni has made a good profit of his journeys west. He later settles in Iceland with his wife and son, and their descendants include some of the earliest Icelandic bishops. The saga ends with what seems to be an attempt to establish its credibility: "Karlsefni has accurately related to all men the occurrences on all these voyages, of which somewhat is now recited here."

== Composition ==
The Saga of the Greenlanders is the name given to the combination of two separate short stories (known as þættir), which are interpolated into the Saga of Óláfr Tryggvason as found in the Flateyjarbók manuscript. These two tales, the Tale of Eric the Red (Eiríks þáttr rauða) and the Tale of the Greenlanders (Grœnlendinga þáttr (I)), are separated by more than fifty columns in the original manuscript, but are commonly combined and translated as one saga.

=== Dating ===
Before mid-1900s, there was a consensus among scholars that the Saga of the Greenlanders was composed during the fourteenth century, a time much later than that of the composition of the other significant Icelandic saga on the Norse colonization of North America, the Saga of Erik the Red. For example, Dag Strömbäck in 1940 suggested that the Saga of the Greenlanders was largely based on oral traditions and represented a "stiff and rhetorical" writing style with uses of alliteration; the saga therefore seemed more modern than those written in the thirteenth century.

However, in 1956, Jón Jóhannesson proposed a new view regarding the composition date of the Saga of the Greenlanders, stating that the saga was the older version of the story of Norse colonization and dating it to around 1200. Jóhannesson examined the genealogies of the couple Karlsefni and Gudrid included near the end of the two sagas, and he noticed that the author of the Saga of Erik the Red referred to one of the couple's descendants, Bishop Brandr, as "Bishop Brandr the First," while the author of the Saga of the Greenlanders simply mentioned the name "Bishop Brandr." According to the genealogies, there were two descendants of Karlsefni and Gudrid that were named Bishop Brandr, one having lived from 1163 to 1201 and the other younger one from 1263 to 1264. Jóhannesson argued that the reference to the older Bishop Brandr as 'Bishop Brandr the First" in the Saga of Erik the Red was to differentiate him from the younger bishop of the same name, and therefore the author could not have composed the saga before 1264; however, the Saga of the Greenlanders was likely composed at an earlier time since no such differentiation was attempted by its author. Additionally, Jóhannesson pointed out that the mention of Leif's stay in Norway in the Saga of Erik the Red was primarily based on the Saga of Óláfr Tryggvason written around 1200 by a monk named Gunnlaugr Leifsson, but the Saga of the Greenlanders did not appear to be influenced by this then famous work, thereby suggesting that the Saga of the Greenlanders was older than the Saga of Erik the Red.

Later, in 1978, Ólafur Halldórsson argued that the two Icelandic sagas were written independently in the early thirteenth century, holding that Jóhannesson's analyses and conclusions were quite debatable. Halldórsson maintained that the fact that the Saga of the Greenlanders did not show dependence on the Saga of Óláfr Tryggvason was not sufficient to prove its anteriority in time.

Expanding on some of Halldórsson's arguments, nevertheless, Helgi Þorláksson in 2001 suggested that the Saga of the Greenlanders could in reality be the younger of the two sagas, possibly dating to the fourteenth century, a theory which coincides with the pre-1956 academic view. To Þorláksson, the fact that the compiler of Hauksbók, a manuscript made in the early fourteenth century that contained various texts including the Saga of Erik the Red, did not include the Saga of the Greenlanders despite his passion for Greenland might mean that the compiler (named Haukr Erlendsson) "simply did not know of" the saga; this would then suggest that the Saga of the Greenlanders might not have been composed by the time Hauksbók was created. Furthermore, in the Saga of the Greenlanders, after Bjarni discovered Vinland and arrived in Norway, he recounted his journey to Earl Eiríkr; Þorláksson held that this Earl Eiríkr was in fact King Eiríkr who was in charge of Norway during the late thirteenth century, and therefore the Saga of the Greenlanders could not be composed at an earlier time.

== Historicity of the Saga ==
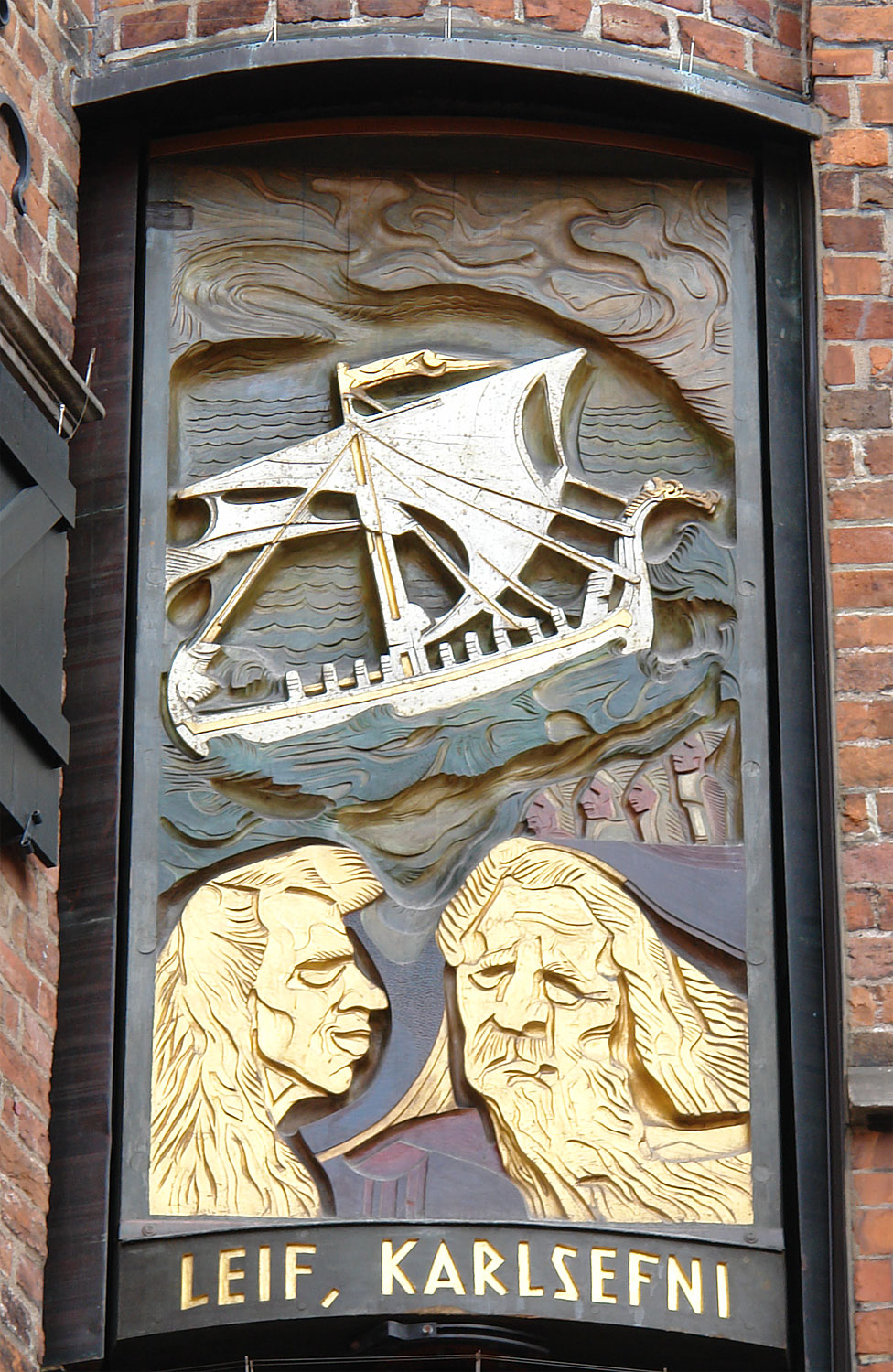
Das Haus des Glockenspiels in Bremen's Böttcherstraße displays this Leif and Karlsefni panel of 10 from Bernhard Hoetger's 1934 "ocean-crossing" set

Scholars have long debated the credibility and historicity of the various stories in the Saga of the Greenlanders as the saga depended primarily on oral traditions, but it has been agreed upon that the saga should not be considered a purely authentic source of historical information. It has been argued that the first chapter in the Saga of the Greenlanders of the Íslenzk fornrit edition underwent changes and additions by Jón Þórðarson, the scribe of Flateyjarbók manuscript where the saga is found; nevertheless, the details of such modifications are largely unknown. The testimony to authenticity at the very end of the saga is considered by some as valid, yet the part of the saga where Thorstein tells Gudrid her fortune implies that the author indeed added fictional elements. These elements were likely intended to make the saga more entertaining for its contemporary audience.

Descriptions in the saga of the life of one protagonist, Gudrid, have also been examined for truthfulness. Ólafur Halldórsson argued in 1986 that the story about how Gudrid first appeared in Greenland was entirely fictitious despite her prominent role in the saga. Moreover, Helgi Þorláksson pointed out that toward the end of the saga, it is mentioned that Gudrid became a nun and a hermit at Glaumbær in Skagafjörðr, while in fact the referenced nunnery was constructed at a different place named Reynisnes.

=== Comparison to the Saga of Erik the Red ===
Before Jón Jóhannesson's 1956 paper, the Saga of the Greenlanders had been thought of as being dependent on less accurate oral traditions and therefore as less factual than the Saga of Erik the Red. With Jóhannesson's proposition that the Saga of the Greenlanders could actually be the older of two, many adopted the idea that the Saga of the Greenlanders was more factual and that the Saga of Erik the Red borrowed parts from it.

The story in the Saga of Erik the Red of Leif's visit to Norway and later evangelization in Greenland under the commission of King Óláfr is considered to be concocted by the monk Gunnlaugr Leifsson, as early historical accounts show that neither King Óláfr nor Leif seems to have actually engaged in the conversion of Greenland; the absence of such a story in the Saga of the Greenlanders thus makes it appear more reliable than the Saga of Erik the Red . As a result, it is implausible that Leif was the discoverer of Vinland, since in the Saga of Erik the Red, Leif should have come upon Vinland during his journey from Norway to Greenland. Instead, Bjarni in the Saga of the Greenlanders might have been the true discoverer. Some have argued that this theory is further supported by the Vinland Map, which was supposedly created around 1440 and mentions Bjarni in its captions describing the discovery of Vinland; however, the map has been declared as a forgery.

Another noteworthy discrepancy between the two sagas lies in their different versions of the story of Erik's tumbling from his horse and injuring his foot before his voyage. In the Saga of the Greenlanders, Erik decides not to go on the journey because he deems his fall as a presage, while in the Saga of Erik the Red, Erik attributes his fall to his concealing a treasure chest. It has been argued by Sven B. F. Jansson that this distinction exemplifies how the Saga of the Greenlanders "preserves an older mode of thought."

In 2001, however, Helgi Þorláksson proposed a different view than that of Jóhannesson. Þorláksson noted that Gudrid's pilgrimage trip to Rome was mentioned in the Saga of the Greenlanders but not in the Saga of Erik the Red. This, together with the mention of Glaumbær instead of Reynisnes as the home of Gudrid in her later years, led Þorláksson to conclude that the Saga of Erik the Red was "closer to more original oral traditions" than the Saga of the Greenlanders.

== Bibliography ==
=== Texts ===
- Einar Ól. Sveinsson; Matthías Þórðarson, eds. (1935). Eyrbyggja saga, Grœnlendinga sǫgur. Íslenzk fornrit. Vol. IV. Reykjavík: Hið íslenzka fornritafélag.
- Storm, Gustav, ed. (1891). Eiríks saga rauða og Flatøbogens Grænlendingaþáttr: samt uddrag fra Ólafssaga Tryggvasonar. S. L. Møllers bogtr. OCLC 64689433.

=== Translations ===
- Beamish, North Ludlow (1841). The discovery of America by the Northmen, in the tenth century. London: T. & W. Boone. p. 64.
- Flateyjarbok. Cophenhagen: Royal Danish General Staff, Topographical Department (1893). Facsimile, with translations into English and Danish
- Reeves, Arthur M., ed. (1895) [1890]. "The Wineland History of the Flatey Book". The Finding of Wineland the Good: The History of the Icelandic Discovery of America. Translated by Reeves, Arthur M. Oxford University Press. pp. 53–78. Archived from the original on 2006-08-31.
  - "Þáttr Eiríks rauða", pp. 140–145 "Grænlendinga Þáttr, pp. 145–158 (Texts and photographic prints of MS.)
- Reeves, Arthur M. (Middleton); Beamish, North Ludlow; Anderson, Rasmus B. (1906). Buel, J. W. (ed.). The Norse Discovery of America: A Compilation in Extensó of All the Sagas, Manuscripts, and Inscriptive Memorials Relating to the Finding and Settlement of the New World in the Eleventh Century. New York: Norrœna Society. p. 207.
- Magnus Magnusson; Hermann Pálsson (2004) [1965]. The Vinland Sagas. Penguin Books. ISBN 0-14-044154-9.
- Örnólfur Thorsson (ed.) (2001). The Sagas of Icelanders. Penguin Books. ISBN 0-14-100003-1

=== Additional sources ===
- Gunnar Karlsson (2000). Iceland's 1100 Years: History of a Marginal Society. London: Hurst. ISBN 1-85065-420-4.
- Ólafur Halldórsson (1978). Grænland í miðaldaritum. Reykjavík: Sögufélag.
- Ólafur Halldórsson (ed.) (1985). Íslenzk fornrit IV : Eiríks saga rauða : texti Skálholtsbókar. Reykjavík: Hið íslenzka fornritafélag
