= Thorfinn Karlsefni (sculpture) =

Bronze statue by Einar Jónsson

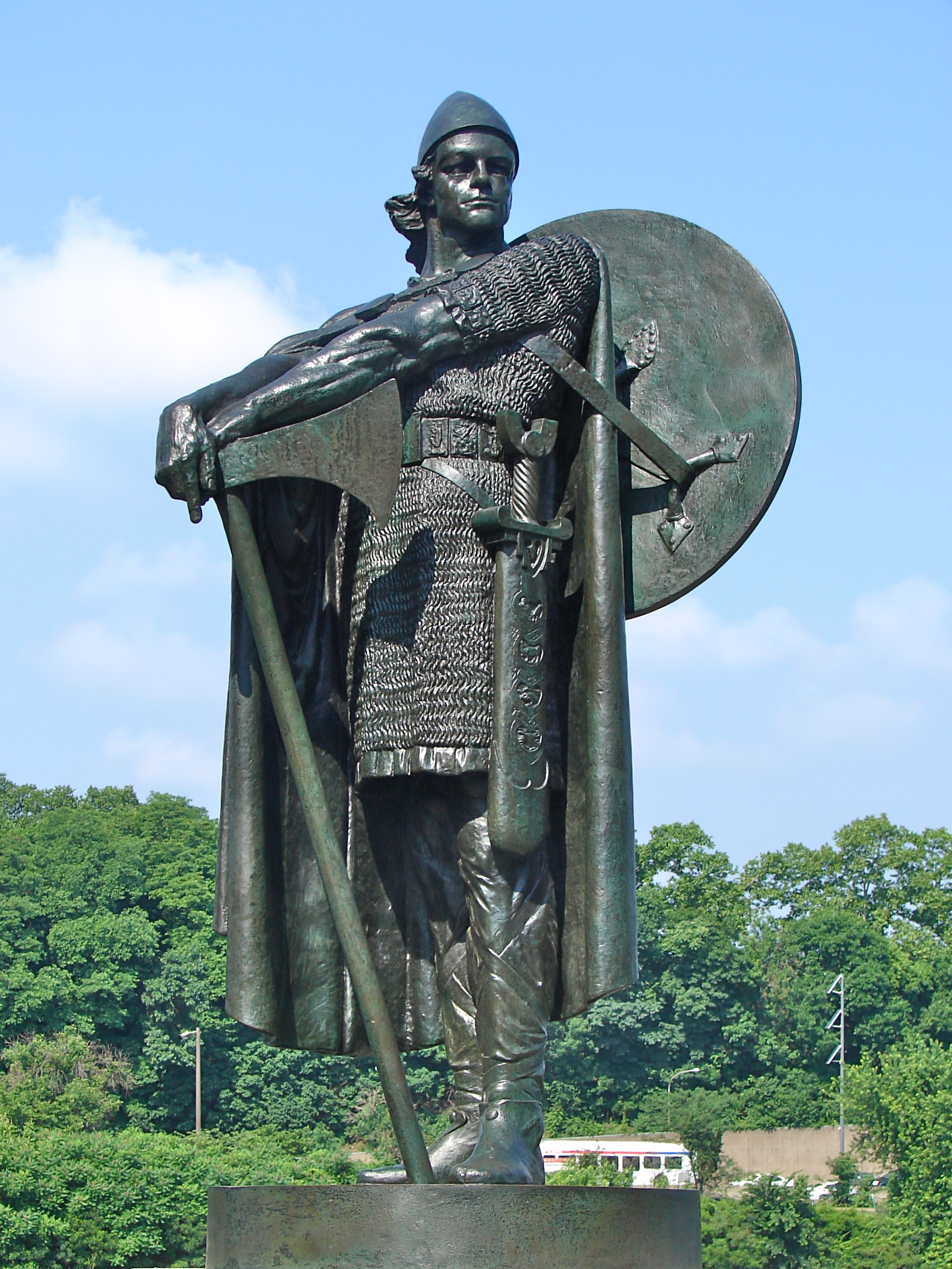
- Artist: Einar Jónsson
- Year: 1920
- Type: Bronze
- Subject: Thorfinn Karlsefni
- Dimensions: 210 cm × 140 cm × 120 cm (84 in × 54 in × 48 in)
- Location: Philadelphia; 39.9702°N 75.19005°W
- Owner: City of Philadelphia; Fairmount Park Commission

Thorfinn Karlsefni is a bronze statue of Icelandic explorer Thorfinn Karlsefni, created by Icelandic sculptor Einar Jónsson. The first casting was located in Fairmount Park in Philadelphia, United States, before being toppled by vandals in 2018. A second casting of the statue is in Reykjavík, Iceland, and the original plaster model is located in the Einar Jónsson Museum.

== History ==
The artwork was commissioned by Joseph Bunford Samuel through a bequest that his wife, Ellen Phillips Samuel, made to the Fairmount Park Art Association, specifying that the funds were to be used to create a series of sculptures "emblematic of the history of America", which would eventually become the Ellen Phillips Samuel Memorial. The statue was installed along Philadelphia's Kelly Drive, near Turtle Rock Light, and unveiled on November 20, 1920. The artwork was one of 51 sculptures included in the Association for Public Art's Museum Without Walls: AUDIO™ interpretive audio program for Philadelphia's outdoor sculpture.

=== Protests and vandalism ===
By the 21st century, the statue had become a common rallying location for local white supremacy groups. In time, these rallies led to counter protests and vandalism of the statue. In the early morning hours of October 2, 2018, police were called to the statue's location and found it had been toppled from its stone base, which broke the head from the body, after which it was dragged into the nearby Schuylkill River. During recovery, a crane was needed to remove the statue, which weighs several thousand pounds, from the river.

As of 2020, the statue was being conserved, but the City of Philadelphia had no timeline for its reinstallation and was taking the appropriation of the statue by hate groups into consideration as it made plans for the future.

== Inscriptions ==
External audio
- Thorfinn Karlsefni (1915–1918), Association for Public Art, Audio only (archive.org)

The inscriptions formerly read:

Sculpture, lower proper left:
Einar Jonsson
sculptor
1915-18

On back of Karlsefni's shield: Icelandic verse:
From the island of the North, of ice and fire,
Of blossoming valleys and blue mountains,
Of the midnight sun and the dreamy mists,
The home of the goddess of northern lights.

Base, front:
Thorfinn Karlsefni
Icelander
1003-1006

Base, front plaque:
Following Leif Ericson's Discovery of
North America in 1003, Thorfinn Karlsefni
with 165 men and 35 women established a
settlement which lasted for 3 years and
his son Snorri was born in North America
Leif Ericson Society of Pennsylvania
Scandinavian Craft Club of Philadelphia
October 9, 1974

== Reykjavík casting ==
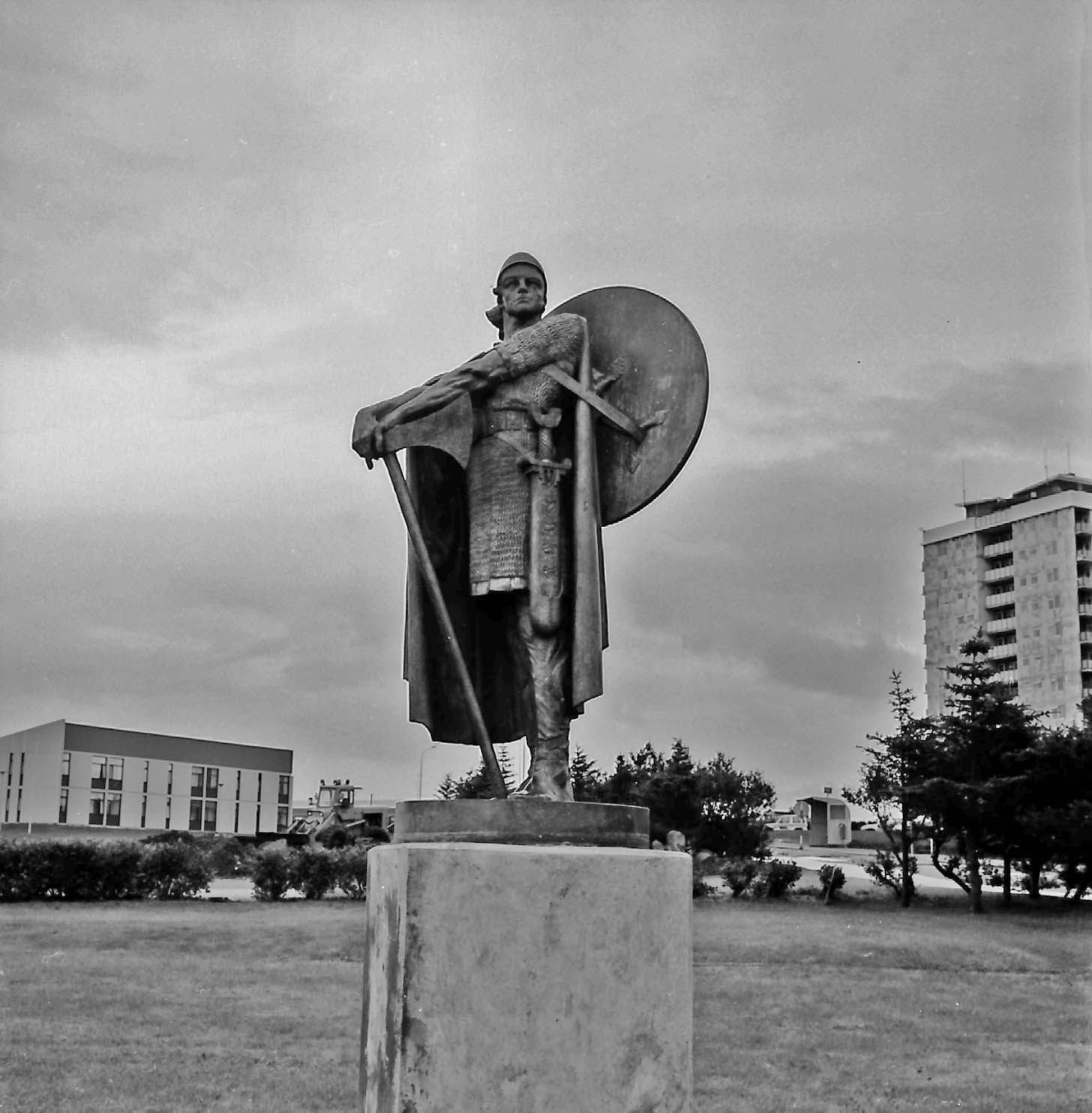
Reykjavík version of the statue (64.14833°N 21.86751°W)

In the late 1930s, the city of Reykjavík paid for another casting of the statue to be made for the 1939 New York World's Fair. The statue stood next to one of two entrances to Iceland's exhibit at the Hall of Nations for the duration of the fair (with a casting of the statue of Leif Erikson by Alexander Stirling Calder at the other entrance). After the fair, the statue of Thorfinn went to Reykjavík. In June 1947, it was erected on a small islet in a pond just south of Tjörnin (today this pond is called Þorfinnstjörn). In 1962, the statue was removed from the islet. The casting now resides in the Laugardalur district of Reykjavík, near a retirement home and movie theater.

== See also ==
- List of public art in Philadelphia
- Gudrid Thorbjarnardóttir: Memorials
