= The Technicolor Time Machine =

1967 novel by Harry Harrison

- Cover of first edition (hardcover)
- Author: Harry Harrison
- Cover artist: Ellen Raskin
- Language: English
- Genre: Science fiction
- Publisher: Doubleday
- Publication date: 1967
- Publication place: United States
- Media type: Print (hardback & paperback)
- Pages: 190 pp
- ISBN: 0-8125-3970-2 (1985 Tor Books edition)
- OCLC: 70865575

The Technicolor Time Machine is a 1967 science fiction novel by American writer Harry Harrison. It is a time travel story with comedic elements, which satirizes Hollywood. The story first appeared in Analog Science Fiction and Fact magazine, where it was serialized in three parts in the March–May 1967 issues, under the title "The Time-Machined Saga."

== Plot introduction ==
The narrative revolves around the efforts of a mediocre film director to save his job, his livelihood and, incidentally, the studio he works for. To do this, he enlists a mad scientist, the crooked studio owner, a jazz tuba player, a cowboy, two fabulously stupid movie stars, and a real live ocean-crossing Viking. He ends up making history, but in a way he never dreamed of.

== Plot summary ==
Barney Hendrickson is a mediocre movie-maker with no prospects, and his employer, Climactic Studios, is about to go out of business, particularly as the owner, L. M. Greenspan, has systematically looted the corporation. In desperation, Hendrickson drags Greenspan to see Professor Hewitt, who claims to have a time machine. Hewitt's idea of a demonstration, sending a bottle seven microseconds into the past, doesn't impress Greenspan. Hendrickson takes over the machine, turns everything up to maximum, and sends Greenspan's Cuban cigar three seconds into the future, burning out the circuitry in the process.

Greenspan is convinced enough to finance a replacement, under cover of a mad scientist's plot device for a horror movie. Hendrickson aims to make a historical movie in the past, with a minimal crew, a handful of actors, and all the other parts filled by extras recruited (hopefully for wampum and beads) from the local people. His first script is Viking Columbus, about the founding of the Vinland settlement, obtained by sending Chinese-American scriptwriter Charley Chang back to a barren Devonian Catalina Island for a month.

On the first trip, they capture a Viking named Ottar in Orkney of the 11th century. With Ottar as local guide and interpreter, paid in bottles of Jack Daniel's, they move an entire sound stage into the past and begin filming. Their stars are Ruf Hawk, a narcissistic he-man, and Slithey Tove, a sex goddess.

In the present the auditors from the bank are arriving in a few days, at which point they will discover the cooked books. Also, Hewitt explains that the time machine must return to the present, a moment after departing, before going to any other time. As a consequence, time used in the present day is lost forever. Hendrickson thinks he can stay in the past as long as necessary, but following an attack by marauders shortly after their arrival, Ruf is injured and refuses to participate in the film. Then the time machine itself breaks down in the present day, taking hours to repair.

Improvising desperately, Hendrickson casts Ottar in the lead and resolves to stay in the past until all is done. They film Ottar setting sail for Vinland with an actual colonizing crew, then the film crew jumps, via present-day Hollywood, to Newfoundland a few months later, tracking Ottar by a radio beacon on his boat. While waiting, they have a nasty encounter with the natives, whom the Vikings will call Skrælings.

Ottar hits the beach and digs in while the cameras roll, then the crew jumps forward a year to give the colonists time to build the settlement and stockade. They learn that Slithey, who had become smitten with Ottar, had been left behind by accident. Not only that, she has Ottar's baby son on her hip.

They continue filming, even during a mass attack by Skrælings, which is repelled with tear gas and Viking axes. Shooting the final scenes, Hendrickson is triumphant—and downcast. Even with all the film shot, he still has to do a soundtrack, dub the spoken lines, and edit the final cut. There is no time in the future to do this, and no equipment in the past. All seems lost.

Hendrickson is all set to walk into Greenspan's office empty-handed, when he is stopped by a surprise visitor—a future version of himself, carrying a finished copy of Viking Columbus and sporting a blood-stained bandage on his left hand. This Hendrickson reassures him that all he has to do is return to the past and complete Viking Columbus, and that everything will work out in the end. Hendrickson #2 then walks into Greenspan's office with the completed film, leaving Hendrickson #1 to wonder what happened to his hand.

Hendrickson #1 realises how the film can be completed in time: once they return to the present they can take as long as necessary in post-production, then jump back to before the deadline with the finished product. Filled with confidence, he returns to Vinland to complete filming. Along the way, however, he gets a wood sliver in his hand, and demands a huge bandage, over which he pours mercurochrome to make it look like blood.

=== Coda ===
Cover of first paperback edition (Berkley Books, 1968).

With the movie a smash hit, Climactic's future is assured. Only one puzzle remains. The Vikings went to Vinland, but where did the real settlers land? The Norse sagas say that the expedition was led by Thorfinn Karlsefni, but there was no sign of him. Then Ottar, overhearing, reveals that his formal name is indeed Thorfinn Karlsefni. Shocked, Barney and Hewitt realize that the colony was founded because they decided to make a movie about founding the colony. Not only that, but Slithey, whose character in the movie was named "Gudrid", has also entered history as the mother of her son, whom she called "Snorey" after what she thought was one of the Seven Dwarfs. (Slithey's ignorance and lack of intelligence is a major plot element.) He will be known as Snorri Thorfinnsson, the ancestor of many Icelanders.

The sagas also mention another important figure, Bjarni Herjólfsson. Barney Hendrickson realizes: "They wrote a part for me!"

The novel ends with Greenspan planning to produce a historical film about the crucifixion of Jesus Christ, shot on location in 1st century Judea, while a horrified Hendrickson tries to talk him out of it.

=== Adaptations ===
The BBC produced a radio play adaption of this novel for the long-running series Saturday Night Theatre. It was broadcast on September 5, 1981.
