= Sven B. F. Jansson =

Swedish runologist (1906–1987)

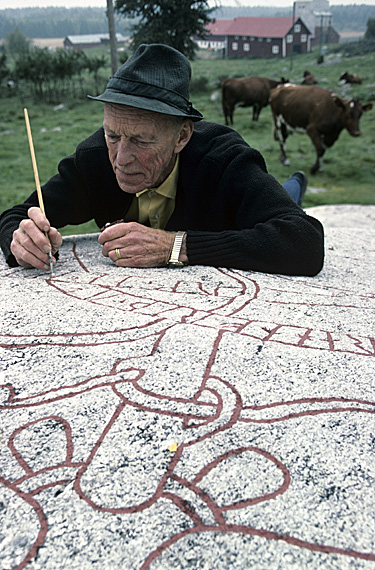
Sven B. F. Jansson painting runes on the Granby Runestone in Vallentuna in 1980.

Sven Birger Fredrik Jansson (1906–1987) was a foreign lecturer 1933–39 at universities such as Reykjavik, antiquarian at the Swedish National Heritage Board (1947–55), professor of Runology at Stockholm University (1955–66) and National Antiquarian (1966–72).

== Career and personal life ==
His Ph.D. discussed the Old Icelandic Vinland sagas. He was also the editor of several tomes in Sveriges runinskrifter, in which many interpretations are based on his work.

Through radio shows and personal connections at field surveys, Jansson was to be widely known. He was a colourful speaker, and his sense of humour and his enthusiasm for the topic was important in creating a wider interest in the public for runes and Scandinavian pre-history.

He was the father of Gunnel Engwall.

== Works ==
- Gotlands runinskrifter, del 1 (1962), Sveriges runinskrifter 11, tillsammans med Elias Wessén.
- Gästriklands runinskrifter, Sveriges runinskrifter 15:1 (1981).
- Isländsk-svensk ordbok, Íslenzk-Sænsk Orðabók, Rabén & Sjögren Bokförlag, Kungälv (1989).
- Närkes runinskrifter, Sveriges runinskrifter 14:1 (1975).
- "Pireuslejonets runor", Nordisk Tidskrift för vetenskap konst och industri, utgiven av Letterstedtska Föreningen. Stockholm (1984).
- Runes of Sweden. Stockholm (1987).
- Runinskrifter i Sverige, Stockholm (1963, 1984).
- Sagorna om Vinland – handskrifterna till Erik den rödes saga, Wahlström & Widstrand, Stockholm (1945).
- Upplands runinskrifter, del 1–4 (1940–58), Sveriges runinskrifter 6–9, tillsammans med Elias Wessén.
- Värmlands runinskrifter, Sveriges runinskrifter 14:2 (1978).
- Västmanlands runinskrifter, Sveriges runinskrifter 13 (1964).
- Norstedts isländsk-svenska ordbok, sjunde upplagan (2005).
