= Gunnfríður Jónsdóttir =

Icelandic sculptor (1889–1968)

- Born: 26 December 1889; Iceland
- Died: 1968 (aged 78–79); Iceland
- Known for: sculptor

Gunnfríður Jónsdóttir (26 December 1889 – 1968), was an Icelandic sculptor born in the North West of Iceland.

== Family ==
Gunnfríður's grandfather was Einar Andrésson, a rhymester who had been suspected of witchcraft. Her parents were Halldóra Einarsdóttir Andréssonar and Jón Jónsson.

== Early life ==
At the age of 19 Gunnfríður attended a young women's school, but was forced to move to Akureyri and learn to be a seamstress after the school burned down. She was to be successful both in Iceland and in Denmark, where she moved in 1919. By 1924 she had returned to Iceland and that year she married Icelandic sculptor Ásmundur Sveinsson. She returned with him to Sweden, where he was studying with sculptor Carl Milles. In 1929 they returned to Iceland, making their home in Reykjavík. Gunnfríður and Ásmundar were divorced about 1940.

== Work ==
In 1931, shortly after returning to Iceland, Gunnfríður created her first sculpture, A Dreaming Boy. This was followed by many other works, a good number of them portraits. The National Gallery of Iceland collection contains a number of her works.

Her best known sculpture, Land in Sight, carved from Norwegian granite, was dedicated at Strandarkirkja in 1950. The work commemorates a local tale of a sailor, lost at sea during a terrible storm, who was guided to shore by a shining female figure. He promised to build a church if he was saved, and thus the first church on that spot was erected around the year 1200. Since that time the bay has been referred to as "Angel Cove".
