= Laugarbrekka =

Abandoned farm in Iceland

Coordinates: 64.754748°N 23.682086°W

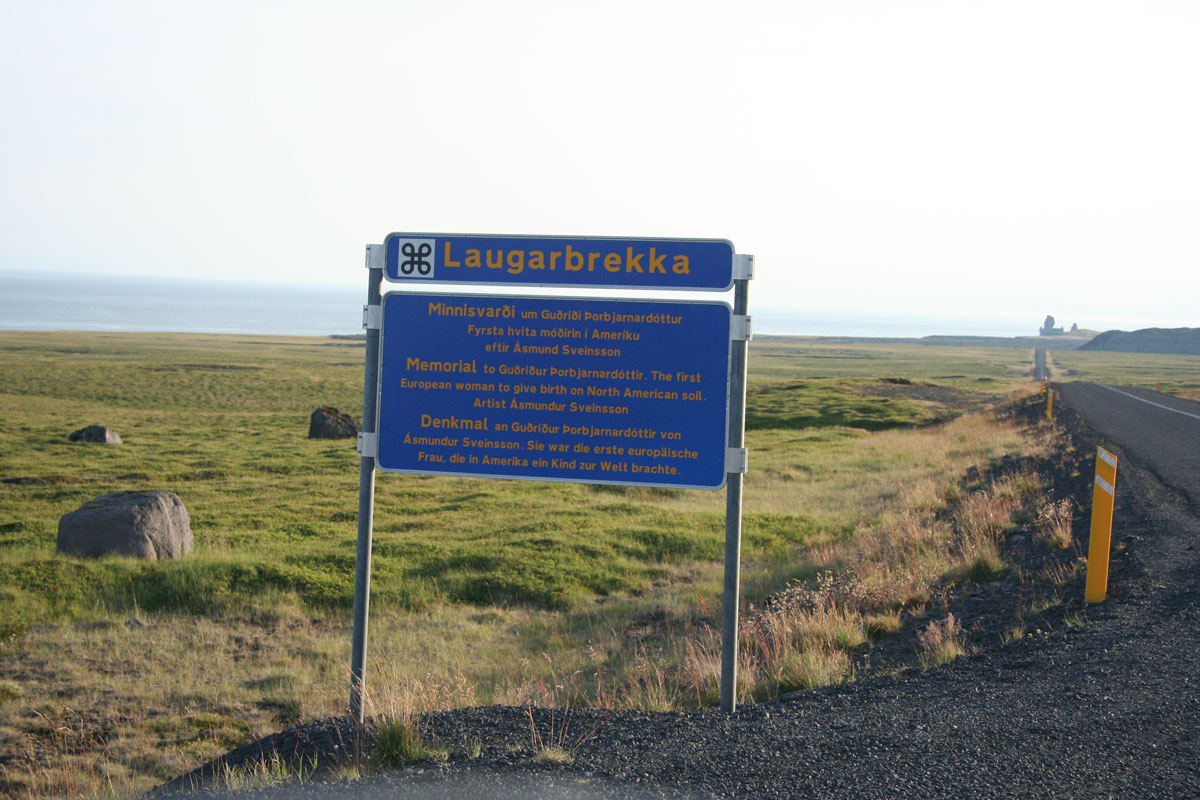
Laugarbrekka road sign

Laugarbrekka [ˈlœyːɣarˌprɛhka] is an abandoned farm located in the west part of Iceland. This farm is located on the N574 road on the Snæfellsnes peninsula just before the Snæfellsnes National Park.

The farm at Laugarbrekka dates back from the settlement. Gudrid Thorbjarnardóttir, (Note: Old Norse: Guðríður Þorbjarnardóttir) wife of Thorfinn Karlsefni, (Note: Old Norse: Þorfinnur Karlsefni Þórdarson) who settled in Vinland (America) around the year 1000, was born here. She was the first European woman to bear a child in America.

Later on she went to Rome, and is considered to be the most widely traveled Icelandic woman down to the 20th century. Until 1881, there was a church here, and for centuries it was also a meeting-place for the local assembly.

Remains of the last turf church and farm buildings can still be seen. According to the legend, Laugarbrekka was the home of Bárður Snæfellsás, the mythical hero of the saga which bears his name.
