= Arthur Middleton Reeves =

American author and philologist (1856 – 1891)

Arthur Middleton Reeves (1856 – 1891) was an American author and philologist, known for his work related to Icelandic and Old Norse studies.

== Biography ==
Reeves was born October 7, 1856, in Cincinnati, Ohio, and spent his early childhood in that city. Later his family located to Richmond, Indiana, where they belonged to the Society of Friends (a Quaker institution). In his late teens he established a printing business in Richmond, which was later combined with the Palladium newspaper.

Reeves attended Cornell University, where he was an editor of the Cornell Era and The Cornelian yearbook. While a student, Reeves developed an interest in languages, acquiring knowledge of several, and excelling at Icelandic. Influenced by Willard Fiske, Reeves focused his studies on the Nordic languages. His 1878 graduation thesis was written on Esaias Tegnér's version of Frithiof's Saga. After graduation he traveled extensively in Europe, including Iceland. Upon his return to the United States, he was tasked by his father to care for a farm of 5,000 acres (2,000 ha), which he called Grasmere.

On February 25, 1891, Reeves was killed in a train derailment. The train, whose coupling rod had dropped, jumped the tracks near Hagerstown, Indiana, and the car Reeves was riding in was thrown down an embankment, breaking his neck. At the time of his death, Reeves was working with Valtýr Guðmundsson on a translation of Laxdæla saga, of which only eighteen chapters had been completed. He was buried in Spring Grove Cemetery in Cincinnati, Ohio. His headstone, which includes carved runes, was brought from Iceland.

Following his death, Reeves' mother made a monetary donation—in memory of Reeves and his father—to the local Richmond library (currently known as the Morrisson-Reeves Library). A 1904 bas-relief portrait of Reeves, created by Janet Scudder, hangs in the library's Historic Courtyard.

== Works ==
- Tegner's "Frithiof's Saga", thesis, Cornell University, 1878
- The finding of Wineland the Good: The History of the Icelandic Discovery of America, London: Henry Frowde, Oxford University Press, 1890
  - Reeve's translations of the Saga of Erik the Red and the Saga of the Greenlanders (as published in The finding of Wineland the Good) have been republished numerous times, including in The Norse Discovery of America, published by the Norrœna Society.
- Jan: a Short Story, Chicago: Unknown publisher, 1892
- The finding of Wineland the Good: The History of the Icelandic Discovery of America, London: Henry Frowde, Oxford University Press, 1895 (Second edition, published posthumously)
- Biography and Correspondence of Arthur Middleton Reeves, London: Henry Frowde, Oxford University Press, 1895 (Posthumously published by Reeves's brother-in-law, William D. Foulke)

=== As translator ===
- Lad and Lass: a Story of Life in Iceland, London: Sampson Low, Marston, Searle & Rivington, 1890 (Translation of original work by Jón Þórðarson Thóroddsen)
