= Gudrid Thorbjarnardóttir =

11th century Icelandic explorer of Vinland

- Born: c. 980 – 1019; Laugarbrekka, Icelandic Commonwealth
- Died: c. 1050
- Known for: Early exploration of Vinland
- Spouses: Thorir the Norwegian; Thorstein Eirikson; Thorfinn Karlsefni
- Children: Snorri Thorfinnsson; Thorbjorn Thorfinnsson

Gudrid Thorbjarnardóttir (Note: Old Norse: Guðríðr víðfǫrla Þorbjarnardóttir [ˈɡuðˌfriːðr ˈwiːðˌfɔrlɑ ˈθorˌbjɑrnɑrˌdoːtːer]; Modern Icelandic: Guðríður víðförla Þorbjarnardóttir [ˈkvʏðˌriːðʏr ˈviðˌfœ(r)tla ˈθɔrˌpja(r)tnarˌtouhtɪr̥]) (born possibly around 980–1019) was an Icelandic explorer, born at Laugarbrekka in Snæfellsnes, Iceland.

She appears in the Saga of Erik the Red and the Saga of the Greenlanders, known collectively as the Vinland sagas. She and her husband Thorfinn Karlsefni led an expedition to Vinland where their son Snorri Thorfinnsson was born, the first known European birth in the Americas (outside of Greenland).

In Iceland, Gudrid is known by her byname víðförla (lit. wide-fared or far-travelled).

== Biography ==
As recorded in The Saga of Erik the Red, Gudrid was the daughter of a chieftain by the name of Thorbjorn of Laugarbrekka, who himself was the son of a freed slave named Vífill. As the story goes, a young man by the name of Einar asked for her hand in marriage, but because his father had been a slave, Gudrid's father refused to give her hand in marriage. Gudrid and her father promptly left Iceland and voyaged to Greenland to accompany Erik the Red. Thirty others went with them on the journey, but the group experienced complications due to poor weather, which slowed their progress during the summer. After this setback, illness plagued the group and half of the company died. Despite these failures, Gudrid and her father landed safely in Greenland in the winter. Although it is not mentioned in The Saga of Erik the Red, according to the Saga of the Greenlanders, at the time Gudrid was married to a Norwegian merchant named Thorir. According to this account, Leif Erikson rescued Gudrid and fifteen men from a skerry, brought them safely to Brattahlíð, and invited Thorir and Gudrid to stay there with him. That winter, Thorir died of illness.

In Erik the Red's Saga, Gudrid exemplifies the transition from the pagan Norse religion to Christianity. One winter, Gudrid, her father Thorbjorn, and his companions feast at the home of Thorkel, who is visited by a seeress named Thorbjorg. Thorbjorg arrives at Thorkel's home, intending to carry out several magic rites, specifically ward songs, for which she needs the women present to help chant. Gudrid is the only woman present who knows the songs, having been taught them by her foster-mother Halldis, but she tells Thorbjorg that "These are the sort of actions in which I intend to take no part, because I am a Christian woman". With minimal effort, however, Thorbjorg and Thorkel convince Gudrid that taking part in the chants will help the people present, and not damage her status as a Christian woman. Gudrid performs the songs with admirable skill.

According to both sagas, Gudrid then married Thorstein Eiriksson, Leif Eiriksson's younger brother and Eirik the Red's son. According to the Saga of the Greenlanders, Gudrid then accompanied her husband on his quest to Vinland, with the hope that he could retrieve the body of his brother Thorvald. The two spent the winter in Lysufjord with a man by the name of Thorstein the Black and his wife Grimhild, but illness soon struck the group and both Grimhild and Gudrid's husband Thorstein died. According to this account, Thorstein temporarily rises from his dead bed to tell Gudrid that she will be married to an Icelander and that they will have a long life together with many descendants. He stated that she would leave Greenland to go to Norway and then Iceland, and after a pilgrimage south, she would return to Iceland, where a church would be built near her farm. According to the Saga of Eirik the Red, Thorstein makes the voyage to Vinland by himself, and it is only upon his return that the two marry. According to the Saga, "Thorstein had a farm and livestock in the western settlement at a place called Lysufjord" and another man by the name of Thorstein (whose wife in this version is named Sigrid) owned a half-share on this farm. The couple moved to the farm and, as in the Saga of the Greenlanders, Thorstein died and told Gudrid of her future, although in this version he focuses more on the importance of Christianity, asking Gudrid to "donate their money to the poor."

After his death, Gudrid moved back to Brattahlíð, where she married a merchant named Thorfinn Karlsefni, who is described in the Saga of Eirik the Red as being "a man of good family and good means" and "a merchant of good repute". According to The Saga of the Greenlanders, after their marriage, and at Gudrid's urging, the two led an attempt to settle Vínland with sixty men, five women, and a cargo of various livestock (while it is implied in The Saga of Eirik the Red that she accompanies him, Gudrid is never actually mentioned in the account of the journey). While in Vínland, the couple had a son whom they named Snorri Thorfinnsson, who is the first European reported to be born in the Western Hemisphere. There is speculation about the birth date of Snorri with birth years such as 1005, 1009, and 1012 being postulated, but all sources agree that he was born between 1005 and 1013. According to the Vinland sagas, when Snorri was 3 years old, the family left Vinland because of hostilities with indigenous peoples (called Skrælingar by the settlers, meaning "barbarians"). The family returned to the Glaumbær farm in Seyluhreppur, Iceland.

According to The Saga of Eirik the Red, the couple had another son named Thorbjorn. Although it is only mentioned in The Saga of the Greenlanders, Thorfin died, leaving Gudrid to live as a widow.

Christianisation of Iceland during this period meant that religious conversions were common. Gudrid converted to Christianity and, when Snorri married, went on a pilgrimage to Rome. While some have discussed the possibility that Gudrid spoke with the Pope on her journey, there is no proof of it. While she was away, Snorri built a church near the estate, fulfilling the prediction that Thorstein had made. When she came back from Rome, she became a nun and lived in the church as a hermit.

== Genealogy ==
Her son Snorri Thorfinnsson had two children: a daughter named Hallfrid, and a son named Thorgeir. Hallfrid was the mother of Thorlak Runolfsson, bishop of Skálholt in the south of Iceland. Thorgeir was the father of Yngvild, the mother of the first Bishop Brand. One of the descendants of her son Thorbjorn, Bjorn Gilsson, was also a bishop of Hólar.

Below is the genealogy of descendants of Snorri, as given in the close of each saga, Grœnlendinga saga ch. 9 and Eiríks saga ch. 14. It is supplemented with further ancestral information from (Eiríks saga ch. 7 and Landnámabók), a more complete family tree for which, see Thorfinn Karlsefni.

Thord of Hofdi (Þórðr fra Höfða Bjarnarson (Note: Eiríks saga Ch. 7, Hauksbók version says "Thord, who lived at Hofdi, son of Bjorn Butter-Box" (Magnusson & Pálsson 1965, p. 91n)which is identifiable with "Thord Bjarnarson (at Hofdi)" in Kunz 2000, Index of Characters. However Thord Bjarnarson does not appear in Kunz's translation of Eiríks saga which does not use the Hauksbók version, and instead, appears only in Vatnsdál saga, another tale in the anthology,))
Snorri Thordarson of Hofdi (Note: "of Hofdi" appended in Kunz 2000, Index of Characters, pp. 759–782, to distinguish from a man in Laxdæla saga)	Vifil of Vifilsdale	Hallveig
Thord Snorrason Horse-head	Thorbjorn Vifilsson
Thorfinn Karlsefni	Gudrid Thorbjarnardóttir
Snorri Thorfinnsson	Thorbjorn Thorfinnsson
Hallfrid Snorradottir	Thorgeir Snorrason	(*) Steinunn (Note: This daughter Steinunn, as well as Haukr's mostly patrilineal line is only given in the Hauksbók manuscript, and his family tree will given under the article Haukr Erlendsson)	Thorunn Thorbjarnardottir
Thorlak Runolfsson, Bp. (Note: Bp.=short for "Bishop". For Bishop Björn and the first Bishop Brand, the patrynomycs are not given in text, but e.g. supplied in Kunz 2000, Index of Characters)	Yngvild Thorgeirsdottir (Note: In Grl. she is spelt Yngveld, and this distinction is kept in Kunz's translations (Kunz 2000, pp. 651, 674); Text of Grl. :"Snorre atti son þann er Þorgæirr het hann var fadir Jnguelldar modur Branz byskups" (Storm 1891, p. 73))	Bjorn Gilsson, Bp.
Brand Sæmundarsson, Bp.
Haukr Erlendsson

== Memorials ==
There is a statue created by the sculptor Ásmundur Sveinsson in 1938 for the 1939 New York World's Fair of Gudrid on display at Glaumbær, in Iceland. Its original Icelandic title refers to Gudrid as "Fyrsta hvíta móðirin í Ameríku" (The first white mother in America). Other copies of this statue, which typically refer to Gudrid as the "first European mother in America," are on display in Laugarbrekka in the Snæfellsnes peninsula on Iceland, in Ottawa, Canada, and at the Vatican. The statue depicts her on a boat, carrying her son Snorri on her shoulder.

== In popular culture ==
Gudrid features as a main character in many modern literary works including Maurice Hewlett's Gudrid the Fair (1918), Harry Harrison's The Technicolor Time Machine (1967), Constance Irwin's Gudrid's Saga (1974), Elizabeth Boyer's Freydis and Gudrid (1976), John Andrew's A Viking's Daughter (1989), Kirsten Seaver's Gudrids saga (1994), Jónas Kristjánsson's Veröld við (1998), Margaret Elphinstone's The Sea Road (2000), Nancy Marie Brown's The Saga of Gudrid the Far-Traveler (2015), Gert Maarløw Nicolaisen's Nornespind (2018), Mathijs Deen's Over oude wegen (2018), a collection of historical European travelogues, and numerous others. Gudrid is also featured in Makoto Yukimura's manga Vinland Saga which follows the story of Thorfinn Karlsefni and his journey to Vinland.
