= Snorri Þorbrandsson =

10th-century Icelandic warrior

Snorri Þorbrandsson (also Snorri Thorbrandsson) was a 10th-century Icelandic warrior. The main sources of Snorri's life are the semi-historical Icelandic sagas.

Snorri appears as a character in the Icelandic Eyrbyggja saga. He was from the area of Álftafjörður in west Iceland. He was a blood-brother of Snorri goði and comrade-in-arms with Þorfinnr Karlsefni. Following mild injury and outlawry resulting from a conflict with Steinthor Thorlaksson (Steinthor of Eyr), Snorri traveled to Greenland with his brother Thorleif Kimbi and perished in battle against the skrælings, the Indigenous peoples of the Americas), during Karlsefni's trip to Vinland.

== Other sources ==
- Pencak, William (1995) The Conflict of Law and Justice in the Icelandic Sagas (Rodopi) ISBN 9789051838350

== Related Reading ==
- Magnusson, Magnus; Pálsson, Hermann (1965) The Vinland Sagas (Penguin) ISBN 0-14-044154-9
- Smiley, Jane (2001) The Sagas of the Icelanders (Viking Penguin) ISBN 0-14-100003-1
