= Snorri Thorfinnsson =

11th-century Icelandic explorer

- Born: c. 1004–1013; Vinland
- Died: c. 1090; Iceland
- Known for: Christianization of Iceland
- Children: 2
- Parents: Thorfinn Karlsefni (father); Gudrid Thorbjarnardóttir (mother)

Snorri Thorfinnsson (Old Norse and Icelandic: Snorri Þorfinnsson or Snorri Karlsefnisson; most likely born between 1004 and 1013, and died c. 1090) was the son of the explorers Thorfinn Karlsefni and Gudrid Thorbjarnardóttir. He is considered to be the first child of European descent to be born in the Americas, apart from Greenland. He became an important figure in the Christianisation of Iceland.

== Name ==
Snorri is an Old Norse name derived from the word snerra, meaning "a fight." Þorfinnsson is a patronymic, meaning "son of Þorfinnr" (see Icelandic naming conventions). Snorri was named for either his great-grandfather, Snorri Þórðarson, or Snorri Þorbrandsson, who was not a kinsman but a participant in Karlsefni's expedition

== Family ==
There is speculation about the birth date of Snorri Thorfinnsson. Birth years such as 1005, 1009, and 1012 have been postulated, but all sources agree that he was born between 1004 and 1013. According to the Vinland sagas, when Snorri was 3 years old, his family left Vinland because of hostilities with indigenous peoples (called Skrælingar by the settlers, meaning "barbarians"). The family returned to the Glaumbær farm in Seyluhreppur.

Snorri Thorfinnsson had two children; a daughter named Hallfrid, and a son named Thorgeir. Hallfrid was the mother of Thorlak Runolfsson, bishop of Skálholt in the south of Iceland. One of the descendants of Snorri's brother Thorbjorn, Bjorn Gilsson, was also a bishop of Hólar. Thorgeir was the father of Yngvild who was the mother of Brand Sæmundarsson, bishop of Hólar. The sculptor Bertel Thorvaldsen claimed descent from Snorri Thorfinnsson in the 19th century.

== Christianisation of Iceland ==
In the 13th century texts Snorri Thorfinnsson and Snorri Thorgrimsson are considered the two main figures responsible for the early Christianisation of Iceland. Consequently, they were portrayed by various writers of the 13th and 14th century as "Christian chieftain models". According to Grœnlendinga saga, Snorri had built the first church of Glaumbaer, which would later increase Christian influence in the area. His descendants became the first Bishops of Iceland, and published the first Christian Code of Iceland.

== Legacy ==
- Snorri Thorfinnsson was purported to be born in Vinland (North America), making him the first European child known to be born in the Americas, provided that Greenland is defined as being outside the Americas.
- In 2002, American archaeologists discovered the remains of a thousand-year-old longhouse located on Iceland's northern coast. It is believed that it was Snorri Thorfinnsson's farmhouse. The longhouse was found near the Glaumbær Folk Museum, at the Skagafjörður Heritage Museum outside the coastal village of Sauðárkrókur. The museum was once thought to have been built on the site of Snorri's farmhouse. According to archaeologists it was "a classic Germanic fortress longhouse like the Great Hall of Beowulf".
- There is a non-profit organisation called The Snorri Program that focuses on the history of Icelandic settlers in North America and regularly runs exchange programs for youth and adults.

== Genealogy ==
Below is the genealogy of descendants of Snorri, as given in the close of each saga, Grœnlendinga saga ch. 9 and Eiríks saga ch. 14. It is supplemented with further ancestral information from (Eiríks saga ch. 7 and Landnámabók), a more complete family tree for which, see Thorfinn Karlsefni.

Thord of Hofdi (Þórðr fra Höfða Bjarnarson (Note: Eiríks saga Ch. 7, Hauksbók version says "Thord, who lived at Hofdi, son of Bjorn Butter-Box" (Magnusson & Pálsson 1965, p. 91n)which is identifiable with "Thord Bjarnarson (at Hofdi)" in Kunz 2000, Index of Characters. However Thord Bjarnarson does not appear in Kunz's translation of Eiríks saga which does not use the Hauksbók version, and instead, appears only in Vatnsdál saga, another tale in the anthology,))
Snorri Thordarson of Hofdi (Note: "of Hofdi" appended in Kunz 2000, Index of Characters, pp. 759–782, to distinguish from a man in Laxdæla saga)	Vifil of Vifilsdale	Hallveig
Thord Snorrason Horse-head	Thorbjorn Vifilsson
Thorfinn Karlsefni	Gudrid Thorbjarnardóttir
Snorri Thorfinnsson	Thorbjorn Thorfinnsson
Hallfrid Snorradottir	Thorgeir Snorrason	(*) Steinunn (Note: This daughter Steinunn, as well as Haukr's mostly patrilineal line is only given in the Hauksbók manuscript, and his family tree will given under the article Haukr Erlendsson)	Thorunn Thorbjarnardottir
Thorlak Runolfsson, Bp. (Note: Bp.=short for "Bishop". For Bishop Björn and the first Bishop Brand, the patrynomycs are not given in text, but e.g. supplied in Kunz 2000, Index of Characters)	Yngvild Thorgeirsdottir (Note: In Grl. she is spelt Yngveld, and this distinction is kept in Kunz's translations (Kunz 2000, pp. 651, 674); Text of Grl. :"Snorre atti son þann er Þorgæirr het hann var fadir Jnguelldar modur Branz byskups" (Storm 1891, p. 73))	Bjorn Gilsson, Bp.
Brand Sæmundarsson, Bp.
Haukr Erlendsson

== Family tree ==
The following stemma is drawn from the genealogy appended to the last chapter of Eiríks saga rauða in Hauk's own recension (in the Hauksbók, supplemented with additional information from the Landnámabók).

Thorir of Espihill
Thorvald Hook (Note: Þorvaldr krók)	Thorfinn Karlsefni
Grundar-Ketil	Snorri Karlsefnisson
Einar	Steinunn
Thorstein the Unjust (Note: Þorsteinn ranglátr; also in Landnamabók, Part III, Ch. X and translated as "Thorstein Wrongdoer" (Ellwood 1898, , p.136))
Jorund of Keldur	Gudrun
Bjarni Bjarnason (Note: Landnamabók, Part V, Ch. VII (Islandinga sögur, Vol. 1, p.295; Ellwood 1898, p. 202))	Halla
Flosi the priest (Note: Landnamabók, Part IV, Ch. I (Islandinga sögur, Vol. 1, p.240; Ellwood 1898, p. 165))	Ragnhild
Olaf(?)	Valgerd Flosadottir
Erlend the Strong	Jorunn (Note: Landnamabók, Part II, Ch. XIX (Islandinga sögur, Vol. 1, p.138; Ellwood 1898, p. 86))
Hauk the Lawman
