= Thorfinn Karlsefni =

Icelandic explorer (c. 980 - c. after 1020)

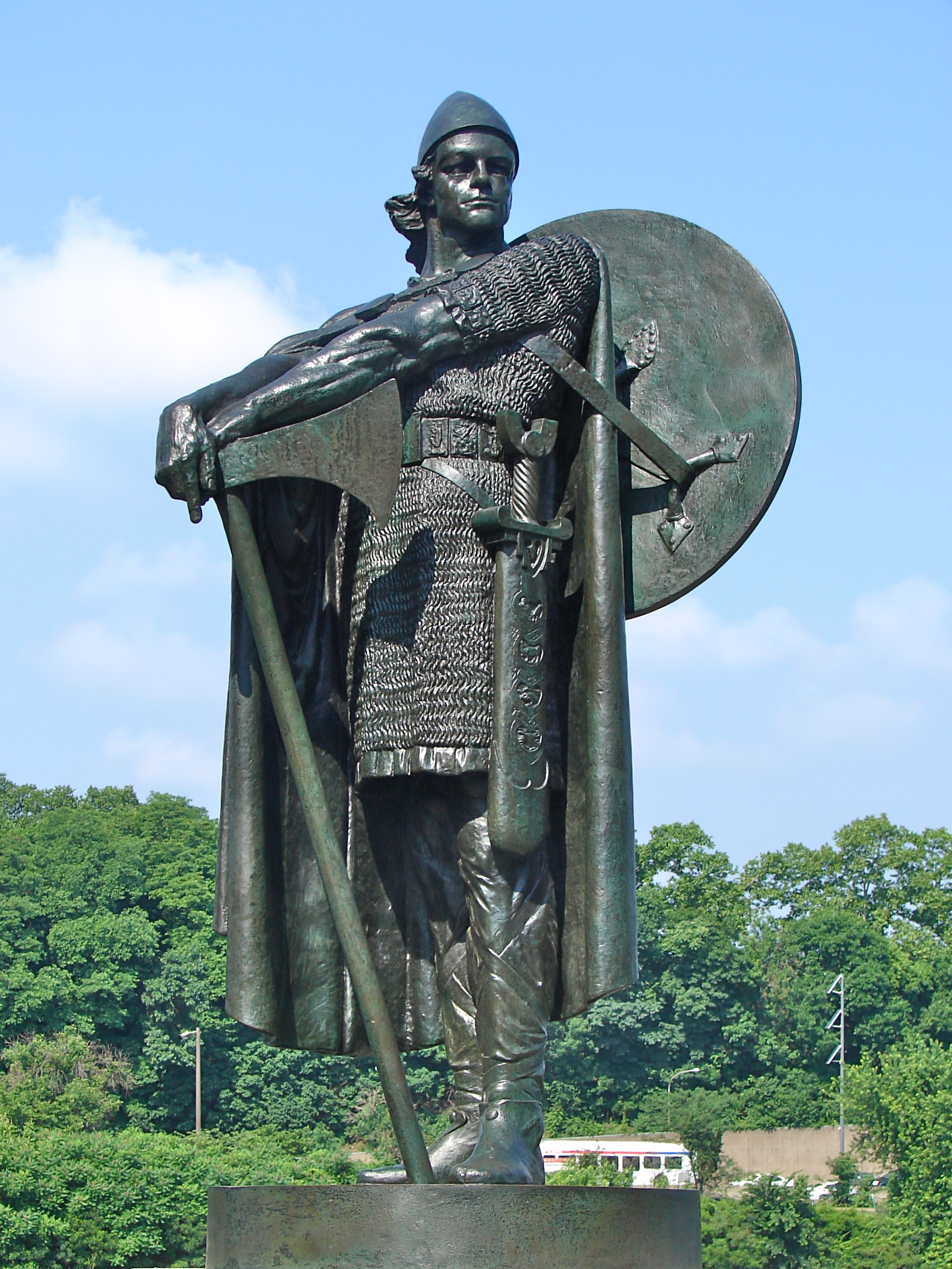
- Statue of Thorfinn as Einar Jónsson imagined him
- Born: c. 980; Icelandic Commonwealth
- Died: c. after 1020
- Occupations: Merchant/Trader & Explorer
- Known for: Early exploration of Vinland
- Spouse: Gudrid Thorbjarnardóttir
- Children: Snorri Thorfinnsson; Thorbjorn Thorfinnsson

Thorfinn Karlsefni Thórdarson (Note: Old Norse: Þorfinnr karlsefni Þórðarson [ˈθorˌfinːz̠ ˈkɑrlˌsevne ˈθoːrðɑz̠ˌson]; Modern Icelandic: Þorfinnur karlsefni Þórðarson [ˈθɔrˌfɪnːʏr ˈkʰa(r)tl̥ˌsɛpnɪ ˈθourðarˌsɔːn]) was an Icelandic explorer. Around the year 1010, he followed Leif Eriksson's route to Vinland in a short-lived attempt to establish a permanent settlement there with his wife Gudrid Thorbjarnardóttir and their followers.

== Nickname ==
The byname Karlsefni means "makings of a man" according to the preface of Magnus Magnusson and Hermann Pálsson, although the Cleasby-Vigfusson dictionary glosses it as "a thorough man", elaborated elsewhere as a "real man", a "sterling man".

== History ==
Thorfinn's expeditions are documented in the Grœnlendinga saga ("Saga of the Greenlanders" henceforth Grl.) and Eiríks saga rauða ("Saga of Eirik the Red" Henceforth Eir.), (Note: Manuscripts of Eiríks saga rauða are indicated by the sigla: A=Hauksbok, B=AM 557=Skálholtsbók in Storm 1891) which together are referred to as "The Vinland Sagas." The two sources differ significantly in their details (see Saga sources below).

=== Greenland ===
In Greenland, Thorfinn met and married Gudrid Thorbjarnardóttir, widow of Thorstein Eiriksson. Gudrid was staying under the care of her brother-in-law Leif Eriksson at Brattahlíð, an estate given to Leif by his father Eirik the Red after his death. Eirik had died in an epidemic c. 1003, though Eir. has him still alive and playing host to Gudrid.

=== Vinland ===
According to Grl., Thorfinn decided to go to Vínland at the insistence of his wife Gudrid. Leif agreed to lend the houses he built in Vinland, but was unwilling to make a free gift of it. Among the other settlers to Vinland was Freydis, the sister or half-sister of Leif Eriksson, who may have accompanied Karlsefni's voyage (Eir.) or headed an expedition of her own that ended in carnage (Grl.).

The Grl. records that Karlsefni left Greenland with 60 men and five women, following the route taken by Leif and Thorvald Eiriksson. The Eir. writes that he took three ships with 140 men aboard, and describes the voyage in greater detail than the Grl. (Note: Smiley 2001, p. 666 gives "hundred plus forty men" and Magnusson & Pálsson 1965, p. 94 "160 people", but Storm 1891 has "var fjórir tigir manna annars hundraðs" with the reading of ".xl. manna ok .c. " (A, Hauksbok) footnoted)

In Vinland, Gudrid bore Thorfinn a boy, Snorri, who was the first child of European descent known to have been born in the New World. Many Icelanders trace their roots to Snorri. The exact location of Thorfinn's colony is unknown, though it may have been the Norse settlement at L'Anse aux Meadows, Newfoundland. Excavations of Thorfinn's home in Greenland in 1930 revealed a deposit of anthracite coal identified as having originated in the vicinity of Rhode Island.

The relatively few women among so many men caused internal tension within the settlement, and inability to cooperate caused abandonment of the settlement in the summer of 1006. Thorfinn reached Greenland safely, but many of the settlers drowned when their ship was wrecked in the Irish Sea.

== Saga sources ==
It has been pointed out that Eiríks saga rauða (Eir.) distorts the facts by giving undue credit to Thorfinn.

For instance, it denies that Thorvald Eiriksson ever led his own voyage to reach Vinland (as Grl. records), even before Thorfinn. Although Thorvald had met his death by Native American arrows in Vinland before Karlsefni embarked, Eir. postponed Thorvald's death so he can be made to accompany Karlsefni to Vinland, ultimately to suffer a more fantastical death from a shot fired by a Uniped. Eir. shifts over to Karlsefni the credit for naming numerous geographic features, from Helluland and Markland to Kjalarnes "Keel Ness", though "this flatly contradicts the Grœnlendinga saga and is assuredly wrong". Helluland (Baffin Island) and Markland were named by Leif; Kjalarness was where Thorvald had wrecked his ship, and the keel was left to stand as a monument, and not an anonymous shipwreck as Eir. puts it.

=== Saga of the Greenlanders ===
According to the Grœnlendinga saga, Thorfinn Karlsefni's expedition commenced after his marriage to Gudrid Thorbjarnardóttir. This marriage to Gudrid was predicted earlier in the saga by Gudrid's first husband Thorstein Eriksson, upon his death. (Note: Thorstein had succumbed to disease when the couple was heading for a journey trying to recover the body of Thorvald in Vinland.) The expedition brought women and livestock, signifying that they planned on being settled in the area for a while. Along the voyage, they ate a beached whale. They also cut timber, harvested grapes, and caught fish and game. A bull they brought frightened the native people (Skraelings). They tried to appease the natives by offering milk, but the natives took ill and battles commenced. Gudrid gave birth to Thorfinn's son Snorri before they headed back to Greenland.

=== Eirik the Red's Saga ===
Eirik the Red's Saga depicts Thorfinn Karlsefni as a successful merchant from Reynines, Skagafjord, in the north of Iceland. Karlsefni embarks on a trading expedition with 40 men, and arrive at Brattahlid, Greenland where they are hosted by Eirik the Red. Karlsefni marries Gudrid that winter. Karlsefni departs with three ships and 140 men in search of Vinland. Karlsefni's expedition winter on a piece of land, where two scouting slaves found grapes and wild grain. Eating a beached whale causes illness, as well as a rift. Thorhall's group declared the whale to be a boon from Thor, offending the Christian members and they part ways.

Karlsefni's expedition discovers further south a bountiful area full of wheat, fish, and game. They attempt contact with the natives who travel in hide-covered boats. The natives leave and the Greenlanders winter there, where their livestock flourish. The following spring, the expedition reencounters the natives and engages in trade with them, until a bull breaks free and frightens away the natives. The natives return after three weeks with hostile intent, a skirmish ensues, and the Greenlanders attempt as best they can to flee into the forest. Karlsefni and his men are saved by Freydis, who scares the natives off by slapping her bare breast with a sword taken from one of the fallen Greenlanders.

The expedition heads back north, and Karlsefni searches for Thorhall in vain. Karlsefni's men encounter the one-legged creature that shoots Thorvald Eiriksson dead with an arrow. Karlsefni's son Snorri is born in the New World. The group eventually decides to return home, and as they pass Markland, they encounter five Skraelings (three adults and two children). The adult Skraelings disappear into the earth, while the children are taken by Karlsefni to Greenland, where they are taught to speak Norse and are baptized. After spending time in Greenland, Karlsefni and Gudrid return to Karlsefni's farm at Reynines, in Iceland.

== Family background ==
Thorfinn Karlsefni was born circa 980–985 in Iceland. His father was Thord Horsehead (Þórðr hesthöfði Snorrason), and his mother was named Thorunn (Þórunn). Thord Horsehead was son of Snorri, son of Thord of Hofdi.

Thorfinn was presumably raised at his father's estate called Stad (Stað) in Reyniness (Reynistaður). This estate was located in the Skagafjord bay area, which is also where Thorfinn's great-grandfather established roots, at his farm of Hofdi in Hofdastrond. (Note: Landnámabók indicates that the great-grandfather Thord of Hofdi had emigrated (from Norway?) to Iceland.) Thorfinn himself also retired in the area in his later years; while Eiríks saga says "he went (back) to his farm in Reyniness," Grænlendinga saga states he bought new lands at Glaumbaer.

A more detailed genealogy (under Eiríks saga rauða, ch. 7) is interpolated in the H or Hauksbók text of Haukr Erlendsson. Haukr had particular interest since he himself claimed descent from Thorfinn. However, Haukr's ancestral trace before Karlsefni's great-grandfather Thord of Hofdi deviates from other sources, and the Landnámabók version is deemed more reliably accurate.

Though not shown in the family tree (right), Thorfinn also claims descent from the matriarch Aud the Deep-Minded through Thord Gellir.

== In modern art ==
In the early twentieth century, Icelandic sculptor Einar Jónsson was commissioned by Joseph Bunford Samuel to create a statue of Thorfinn Karlsefni through a bequest that his wife, Ellen Phillips Samuel, made to the Fairmount Park Art Association (of Philadelphia, now the Association for Public Art). Her bequest specified that the funds were to be used to create a series of sculptures "emblematic of the history of America." Thorfinn Karlsefni (1915–1918) was installed along Philadelphia's Kelly Drive near the Samuel Memorial and unveiled on November 20, 1920. There is another casting of the statue in Reykjavík, Iceland.

By the 21st century, the statue in Philadelphia had become a common rallying location for local white supremacy groups. In time, these rallies led to counter protests and vandalism of the statue. In the early morning hours of October 2, 2018, police were called to the statue's location and found it had been toppled from its stone base and dragged into the nearby Schuylkill River. As of 2020, the statue was being conserved, but the City of Philadelphia had no timeline for its reinstallation and was taking the appropriation of the statue by hate groups into consideration as it made plans for the future.

== In popular culture ==
The 1967 comedic science fiction novel The Technicolor Time Machine by Harry Harrison reveals at its ending that the character named Ottar—an 11th-century Viking hired by a film studio as consultant and actor—is indeed Thorfinn Karlsefni.

Elizabeth H. Boyer published "Freydis and Gudrid" in 1978, a fictionalized account of the first Vinland settlement.

Margaret Elphinstone's "The Sea Road" (2000) is a novel told in the first person. As an old woman, Gudrid recounts her childhood in Iceland, her family's harrowing voyage to Greenland, her marriages, and the trip to Vinland led by Thorfinn Karlsefni.

A fictionalized version of Thorfinn Karlsefni is the protagonist of the 2005 manga series Vinland Saga, created by Makoto Yukimura, which was adapted into an anime in 2019.

== Footnotes ==
=== Explanatory notes ===
Genealogy tree notes
