= Thorstein Eiriksson =

Icelandic explorer

Thorstein Eiriksson (Old Norse: Þórsteinn Eiríksson [ˈθoːrˌstɛinː ˈɛiˌriːksˌson]) was the third and youngest son of Erik the Red.

Almost nothing is known about Thorstein's life. According to the Vinland Sagas, Erik the Red settled in Greenland around 986 with his wife and three grown sons, Leif, Thorvald and Thorstein.

After Leif had sailed west from Greenland and discovered Vinland, Thorvald organized and led a second expedition to this new country. The natives, called Skraelings by the Norse, attacked Thorvald and his men. Thorvald received a fatal wound and was buried in Vinland. His crew returned to Greenland.

Thorstein subsequently set sail for Vinland to retrieve his brother's body, along with his wife Gudrid. The ship was beset by bad weather and never reached Vinland. By the first week of winter they had returned to Greenland and landed at Lysufiord in the Western Settlement where they sought shelter with the families living there.

That winter an epidemic swept the settlement killing Thorstein and several others.
