= 900 =

Calendar year

900 in various calendars
- Gregorian calendar: 900; CM
- Ab urbe condita: 1653
- Armenian calendar: 349; ԹՎ ՅԽԹ
- Assyrian calendar: 5650
- Balinese saka calendar: 821–822
- Bengali calendar: 306–307
- Berber calendar: 1850
- Buddhist calendar: 1444
- Burmese calendar: 262
- Byzantine calendar: 6408–6409
- Chinese calendar: 己未年 (Earth Goat); 3597 or 3390 — to — 庚申年 (Metal Monkey); 3598 or 3391
- Coptic calendar: 616–617
- Discordian calendar: 2066
- Ethiopian calendar: 892–893
- Hebrew calendar: 4660–4661
- Hindu calendars
- Vikram Samvat: 956–957
- Shaka Samvat: 821–822
- Kali Yuga: 4000–4001
- Holocene calendar: 10900
- Iranian calendar: 278–279
- Islamic calendar: 286–288
- Japanese calendar: Shōtai 3 (昌泰３年)
- Javanese calendar: 798–799
- Julian calendar: 900; CM
- Korean calendar: 3233
- Minguo calendar: 1012 before ROC 民前1012年
- Nanakshahi calendar: −568
- Seleucid era: 1211/1212 AG
- Thai solar calendar: 1442–1443
- Tibetan calendar: ས་མོ་ལུག་ལོ་ (female Earth-Sheep); 1026 or 645 or −127 — to — ལྕགས་ཕོ་སྤྲེ་ལོ་ (male Iron-Monkey); 1027 or 646 or −126

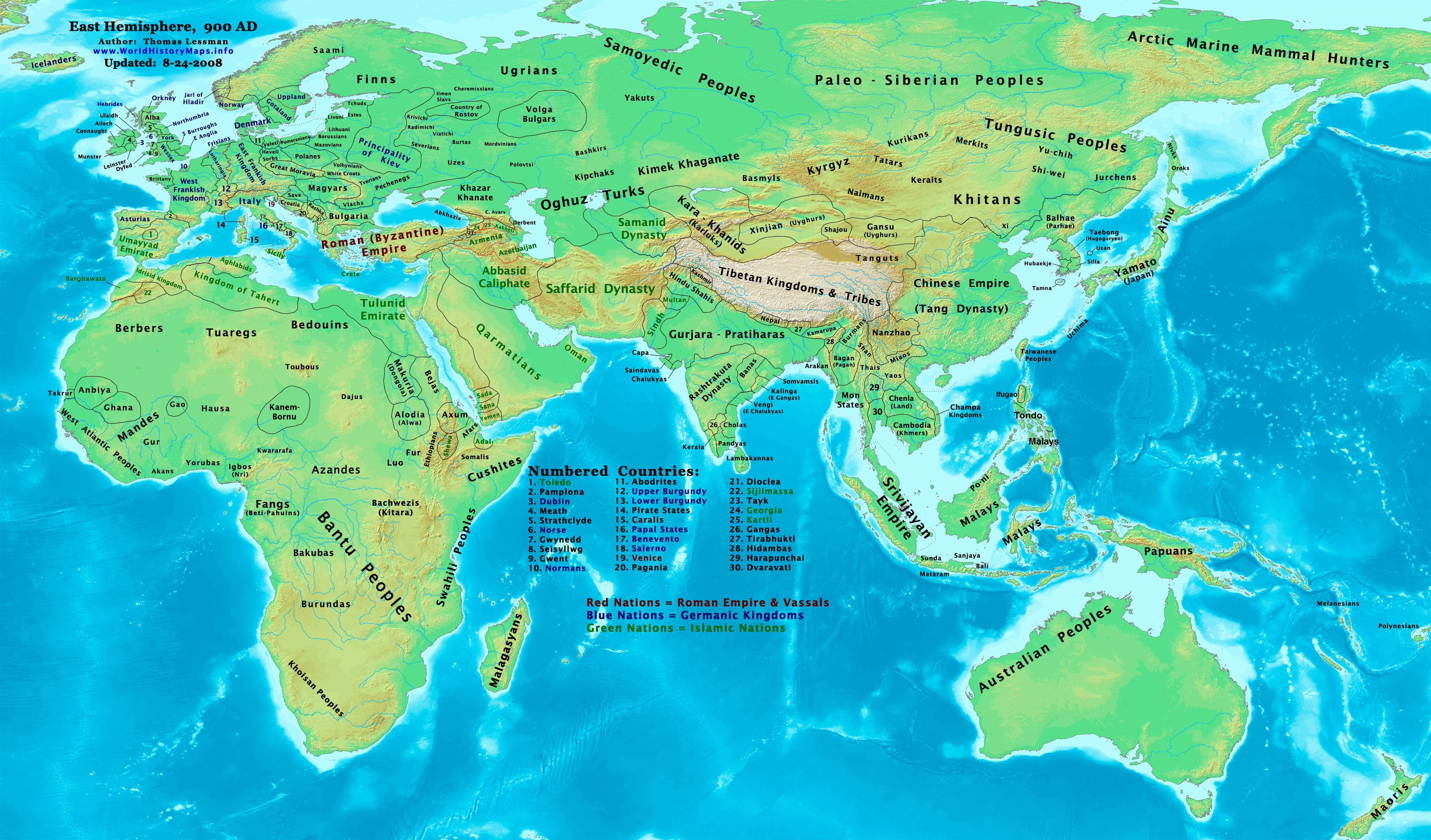
The Earth's Eastern Hemisphere (c. 900)

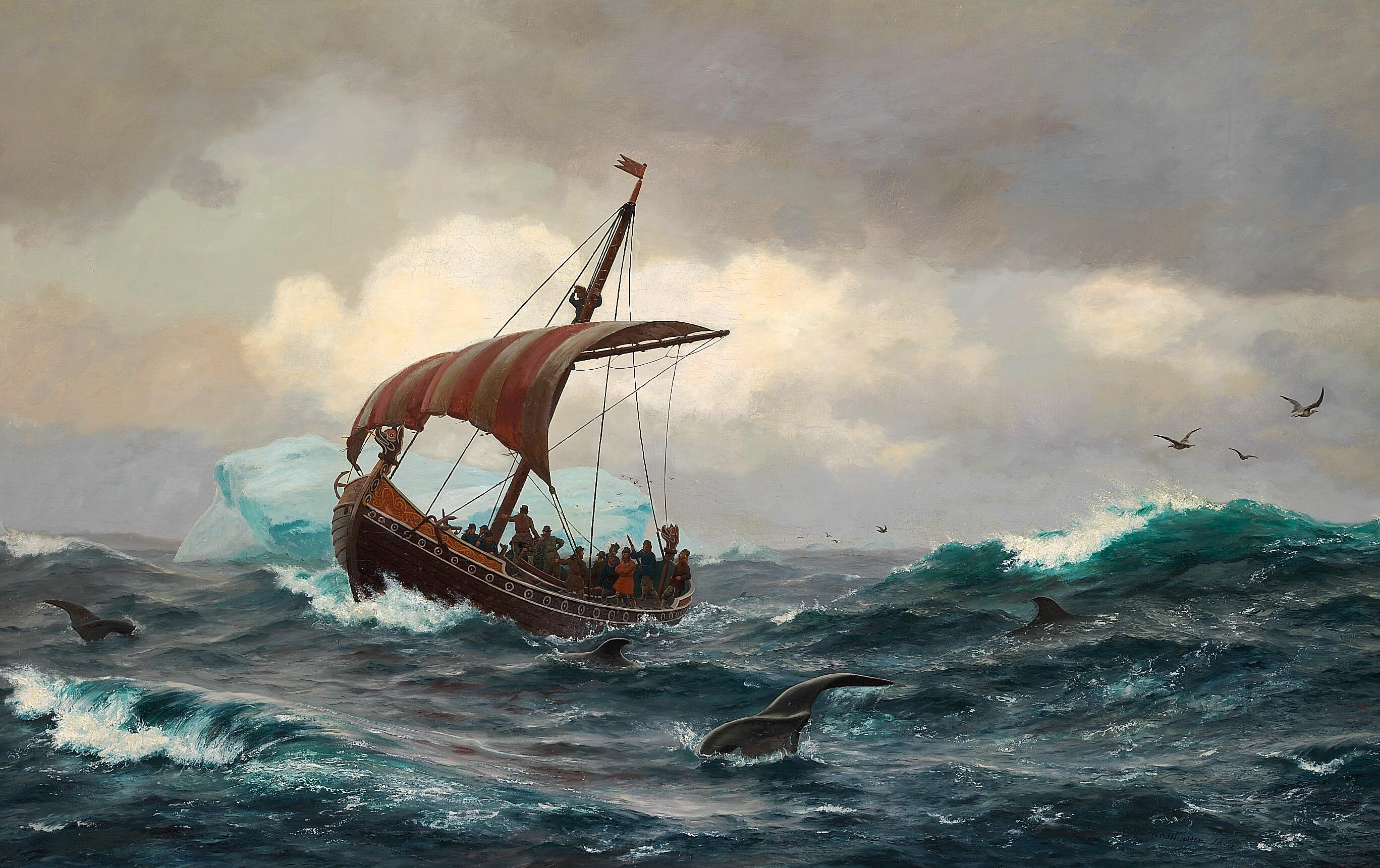
Gunnbjörn discovers Greenland (c. 900)

Year 900 (CM) was a leap year starting on Tuesday of the Julian calendar.

== Events ==
=== By place ===
==== Abbasid Caliphate ====
- Spring – Forces under the Transoxianian emir Isma'il ibn Ahmad are victorious at Balkh (Northern Afghanistan) over Amr ibn al-Layth; the latter is captured and sent to Caliph Al-Mu'tadid in Baghdad. The Samanid Dynasty rules over Khorasan, as well as Transoxiana. A few months later, the Samanids conquer the Zaydid emirate of Tabaristan. This victory marks the beginning of the dispersion of the local Shi'ites by the new Sunni power.
- Arab–Byzantine wars: Emperor Leo VI ("the Wise") begins an offensive against the Abbasid army in Cilicia, Upper Mesopotamia and Armenia. He also continues the war against the Muslims in Sicily and southern Italy.
- The future founder of the Fatimid Caliphate, Abdallah al-Mahdi and his family migrate to North Africa. They claim to be descendants of Fatimah, the daughter of the Islamic prophet Muhammad.
- The Qarmatians of al-Bahrayn, under Abu Sa'id al-Jannabi, score a major victory over the Abbasid army led by al-Abbas ibn Amr al-Ghanawi.

==== Europe ====
- Spring – Atenulf I, Lombard prince of Capua, conquers the Duchy of Benevento. He deposes Duke Radelchis II and unites the two southern Lombard duchies in Mezzogiorno (Southern Italy). The Byzantines offer a strategic alliance to Atenulf who directs a campaign against the Saracens. They establish themselves on the banks of the Garigliano River. From here, Arab warbands launch frequent raids in Campania.
- February 4 – The 7-year-old Louis IV ("the Child") is proclaimed king of the East Frankish Kingdom at an assembly at Forchheim (Bavaria). Because of his young age, the reins of government are entirely in the hands of others – the Frankish nobles and bishops. The most influential of Louis' councillors are Hatto I, archbishop of Mainz, and Solomon III, bishop of Constance.
- June 8 – Edward the Elder (son of Alfred the Great) is crowned king of England at Kingston upon Thames.
- June 17 – Baldwin II, Count of Flanders has Fulk the Venerable, bishop of Reims, assassinated.
- June 29 – The Venetians repel the Magyar raiders at Rialto.
- Summer – After the death of his wife Zoe Zaoutzaina, the Byzantine emperor Leo VI marries Eudokia Baïana.
- August – Abdallah, son of the Aghlabid emir Ibrahim II, represses a revolt of his Muslim subjects, and then initiates a campaign against the last Byzantine strongholds in Sicily.
- August 13 – Zwentibold, king of Lotharingia, is killed in battle on the Meuse River, while fighting against his rebellious subjects; subsequently they recognize Louis IV as their rightful suzerain - Lotharingia is then converted from a kingdom to a duchy.
- October 12 – Following Magyars raids in Lombardy, king Louis III ("the Blind") is called to Italy by the grandees. He takes Pavia, forcing king Berengar I to flee, and replaces him as King of Italy.
- King Donald II is killed after an 11-year reign. He is succeeded by his cousin Constantine II as king of Scotland; he will reign for more than 40 years.
- Docibilis I of Gaeta and his Saracen mercenaries attack Capua, in vain.
- After the rejection of their alliance proposal by the Bavarians, the Hungarians attack this country, occupying Pannonia and parts of Ostmark, which become part of the Hungarian state.

==== Asia ====
- April 21 – Namwaran and his children, Lady Angkatan and Bukah, are granted pardon by the Lakan (ruler) of Tondo, as represented by Jayadewa, Lord Minister of Pila, which released them of all their debts as inscribed in the Laguna Copperplate Inscription (Philippines).
- Maravarman Rajasimha II, king of Pandya, begins to rule. He is constantly at war with Chola (his overlord) and becomes the last ruler of the first Pandyan Empire (India).
- December 1 – Emperor Zhao Zong is deposed and forced by a group of Tang eunuchs led by Liu Jishu to abdicate the throne to his son, Crown Prince Li Yu (until 901).

==== Mesoamerica ====
- The Postclassic Period: The Maya civilization that has flourished for about 650 years in upland areas of what later will be called Central America comes to an end as a result either of depleted agricultural resources or warfare between some 40 rival city-states. The great stone pyramids, ball courts and other structures at cities such as Tikal, Copán, and Palenque are abandoned and overgrown with jungle, as will eventually be the sculpture and relief carvings of the Maya, who have developed a calendar based on almost perfect astronomic measurements. Cities such as Chichen Itza, Mayapan and Uxmal in the highlands of the Yucatán Peninsula will continue to flourish.
- In Peru the Lambayeque people establish themselves over areas previously developed by the Moche (approximate date).

=== By topic ===
==== Art ====
- c. 900 –1230 – Pueblo Bonito, Chaco Canyon, New Mexico, is built by the Ancestral Pueblo people.

==== Religion ====
- January – Pope John IX dies after a two year reign. He is succeeded by Benedict IV as the 117th pope of the Catholic Church.

==== Commerce ====
- The east coast of Africa is impacted by trade and Arab, Persian and Indian traders mix with the indigenous Bantu. Many of the coastal Bantu adopt Islam, reaching as far south as Sofala (Mozambique).

==== Exploration ====
- Greenland is discovered by the Norseman Gunnbjörn Ulfsson, sailing from Norway to Iceland: he is blown off course by a storm and comes in sight of some islands off the coast (approximate date).

==== Medicine ====
- The Persian scientist Muhammad ibn Zakariya al-Razi distinguishes smallpox from measles in the course of his writings. Holding against any sort of orthodoxy, particularly Aristotle's physics, he maintains the conception of an 'absolute' time, regarded by him as "a never-ending flow".

== Births ==
- Abū Ja'far al-Khāzin, Persian astronomer (d. 971)
- Adaldag, archbishop of Bremen (approximate date)
- Berengar II, king of Italy (approximate date)
- Berthold, duke of Bavaria (approximate date)
- Conrad, bishop of Constance (approximate date)
- Fujiwara no Saneyori, Japanese statesman (d. 970)
- Gero, archbishop of Cologne (approximate date)
- Gero, Frankish nobleman (approximate date)
- John of Gorze, Frankish abbot and diplomat (d. 974)
- Mord Fiddle, Icelandic farmer and law expert (d. 968)
- Nicodemus of Mammola, Italian monk (d. 990)
- Ramiro II, king of León (approximate date)
- Ramwold, Frankish abbot (approximate date)
- Rasso, Frankish military leader (approximate date)
- Yang Pu, emperor of Wu (d. 939)

== Deaths ==
- June 17 – Fulk, archbishop of Reims
- July 8 – Qatr al-Nada, wife of the Abbasid caliph al-Mu'tadid
- August 13 – Zwentibold, king of Lotharingia (b. 870)
- Donald II, king of the Picts (Scotland)
- Dongshan Shouchu, Chinese Zen teacher
- Eardulf, bishop of Lindisfarne (approximate date)
- Fujiwara no Takafuji, Japanese nobleman (b. 838)
- Ibn Abi Asim, Muslim Sunni scholar (b. 822)
- John IX, pope of the Catholic Church
- Lde-dpal-hkhor-btsan, Indian ruler
- Litan, Irish abbot (approximate date)
- Liu Chongwang, chancellor of the Tang Dynasty
- Li Zhirou, chancellor of the Tang Dynasty
- Merfyn ap Rhodri, king of Powys (approximate date)
- Muhammad ibn Zayd, emir of Tabaristan (Iran)
- Ono no Komachi, Japanese poet (approximate date)
- Tadg mac Conchobair, king of Connacht (Ireland)
- Wang Tuan, chancellor of the Tang Dynasty
- Wulfhere, archbishop of York (approximate date)
