= Bibliography of Greenland =

- Greenland
- Subject: Greenland
- Scope: Books, journal articles, book chapters
- Period covered: Prehistory to the present
- Languages: English
- Related: Culture of Greenland; History of Greenland; Politics of Greenland
- Related outlines and indexes: Outline of Greenland; Timeline of Greenland

This is a select bibliography of academic level books and journal articles, with major newspapers and magazine articles covering more recent events, about Greenland its history, peoples, society and culture, politics, economy, geography and environment. The bibliography runs from Paleo-Inuit and Norse settlement through Danish colonial rule, Greenland's years as a Danish county, Home Rule and self-government, and covers the Inuit peoples of Greenland, local history, exploration and science.

Greenland (Note: Greenlandic: Kalaallit Nunaat, pronounced [kalaːɬːit nʉnaːt]; Danish: Grønland, pronounced [ˈkʁɶnˌlænˀ]) is an autonomous territory (Note: Danish: rigsdel, literally 'realm part') of the Kingdom of Denmark and is the largest of the kingdom's three constituent parts by land area, the others being Denmark proper and the Faroe Islands. Citizens of Greenland are citizens of Denmark. They are thus citizens of the European Union (EU), although Greenland is not part of the EU. It is the world's largest island (Note: Afro-Eurasia, the Americas, Australia, and Antarctica are all larger than Greenland, but they are generally considered continents, not islands.) and lies between the Arctic and Atlantic oceans, east of the Canadian Arctic Archipelago. It shares a small 1.2-kilometre (0.75 mi) border with Canada on Hans Island. The capital and largest city is Nuuk. Kaffeklubben Island off the northern coast is the world's northernmost undisputed point of land (Note: Stray Dog West is considered the most northerly competitor claim, although it is generally sunken at high tide.) – Cape Morris Jesup on the main island was thought to be so until the 1960s. Economically, Greenland is heavily reliant on aid from Denmark, which has averaged 5.4 billion kr. (€724 million) annually in the period 2019–2023, amounting to more than 20% of the territory's gross domestic product.

Bibliography contains academic level English language books (including translations) and journal articles, published mainly post World War II. (Note: Works published before World War II should be limited to areas where there are no significant post-World War II books on the subject or when the work in question has significant historical merit.) Book entries may have references to reviews published in academic journals or major newspapers when these could be considered helpful. These reference reviews also function as a resource to find other works on this subject.

Works listed here are cited in the notes or bibliographies of scholarly sources. Each is published by an academic or major trade press, written by a recognized expert, or substantially reviewed in scholarly journals; borderline cases are omitted. A selection of primary sources is included. Many of the books below carry their own bibliographies; see Further reading section for longer ones, and External links section for historical sites and museums.

Citations follow APA style. (Note: Entries are in plain text APA 7 format; templates are used only for identifiers, reviews and notes.) Books have citations to academic journal or mainstream published reviews when available. For books only partly about the subject, give relevant chapter or section titles where useful and available. Translators of the original-language edition are included when possible. In cases where a title or name has appeared with more than one English spelling, the most recent published form is used and a footnote documents any earlier title under which the work appeared.

== General works ==
- Buchanan, E. (2025). So you want to own Greenland? Lessons from the Vikings to Trump. Hurst Publishers. doi:10.14375/np.9781805264613
- Ehrlich, G. (2001). This cold heaven: Seven seasons in Greenland. Pantheon Books.
- Gad, F. (1971). The history of Greenland: Vol. 1. Earliest times to 1700 (E. Dupont, Trans.). McGill-Queen's University Press. doi:10.1515/9780773592858
- Gad, F. (1973). The history of Greenland: Vol. 2. 1700–1782. McGill-Queen's University Press. doi:10.1515/9780773592865
- Gad, F. (1983). The history of Greenland: Vol. 3. 1782–1808 (C. Jones, Trans.). McGill-Queen's University Press. doi:10.1515/9780773594432
- Howkins, A., & Roberts, P. (Eds.). (2023). The Cambridge history of the polar regions (ch. 20, Heinrich, J., "Greenland: From colony to self-government, 1721–2021", pp. 487–509). Cambridge University Press. doi:10.1017/9781108555654
- Koch, N. E. (Ed.). (2023). Greenland. Rowman & Littlefield. doi:10.5771/9781538181256
- Vahl, M., Amdrup, G. C., Bobé, L., & Jensen, A. S. (Eds.). (1928). Greenland (Vols. 1–3). C. A. Reitzel; Humphrey Milford.

== History by period ==
=== Pre-colonial period (before 1721) ===
==== Paleo-Inuit and Inuit ====
- Friesen, T. M., & Arnold, C. D. (2008). The timing of the Thule migration: New dates from the western Canadian Arctic. American Antiquity, 73(3), 527–538. doi:10.1017/s0002731600046850
- Friesen, T. M., & Mason, O. K. (Eds.). (2016). The Oxford handbook of the prehistoric Arctic (Grønnow, B., "Independence I and Saqqaq: The first Greenlanders"; Jensen, J. F., "Greenlandic Dorset"; LeMoine, G., & Darwent, C., "Development of Polar Inughuit culture in the Smith Sound region"; Gulløv, H. C., "Inuit-European interactions in Greenland"). Oxford University Press. doi:10.1093/oxfordhb/9780199766956.001.0001
- Grønnow, B., & Jensen, J. F. (2003). The northernmost ruins of the globe: Eigil Knuth's archaeological investigations in Peary Land and adjacent areas of High Arctic Greenland. Museum Tusculanum Press. doi:10.26530/OAPEN_342372
- Grønnow, B. (2017). The frozen Saqqaq sites of Disko Bay, West Greenland: Qeqertasussuk and Qajaa (2400–900 BC): Studies of Saqqaq material culture in an Eastern Arctic perspective. Meddelelser om Grønland. Man & Society, 45. doi:10.7146/mog-ms.v45.147069
- Gulløv, H. C. (1997). From Middle Ages to colonial times: Archaeological and ethnohistorical studies of the Thule culture in South West Greenland 1300–1800 AD. Meddelelser om Grønland. Man & Society, 23. doi:10.7146/mog-ms.v23.146781
- Hart Hansen, J. P., Meldgaard, J., & Nordqvist, J. (Eds.). (1991). The Greenland mummies. Smithsonian Institution Press.
- Jensen, J. F. (2006). The Stone Age of Qeqertarsuup Tunua (Disko Bugt): A regional analysis of the Saqqaq and Dorset cultures of Central West Greenland. Meddelelser om Grønland. Man & Society, 32. doi:10.7146/mog-ms.v32.147039
- Maxwell, M. S. (1985). Prehistory of the Eastern Arctic. Academic Press.
- McGhee, R. (1996). Ancient people of the Arctic. UBC Press.
- Meldgaard, M. (2004). Ancient harp seal hunters of Disko Bay: Subsistence and settlement at the Saqqaq culture site Qeqertasussuk (2400–1400 BC), West Greenland. Museum Tusculanum Press. doi:10.26530/OAPEN_342353
- Raghavan, M., DeGiorgio, M., Albrechtsen, A., Moltke, I., Skoglund, P., et al. (2014). The genetic prehistory of the New World Arctic. Science, 345(6200), 1255832. doi:10.1126/science.1255832
- Rasmussen, M., Li, Y., Lindgreen, S., Pedersen, J. S., Albrechtsen, A., et al. (2010). Ancient human genome sequence of an extinct Palaeo-Eskimo. Nature, 463(7282), 757–762. doi:10.1038/nature08835

==== Norse Greenland ====
- Arneborg, J., & Gulløv, H. C. (Eds.). (1998). Man, culture and environment in ancient Greenland. Danish Polar Center.
- Arneborg, J., Heinemeier, J., Lynnerup, N., Nielsen, H. L., Rud, N., & Sveinbjörnsdóttir, Á. E. (1999). Change of diet of the Greenland Vikings determined from stable carbon isotope analysis and 14C dating of their bones. Radiocarbon, 41(2), 157–168. doi:10.1017/S0033822200019512
- Barrett, J. H., Boessenkool, S., Kneale, C. J., O'Connell, T. C., & Star, B. (2020). Ecological globalisation, serial depletion and the medieval trade of walrus rostra. Quaternary Science Reviews, 229, 106122. doi:10.1016/j.quascirev.2019.106122
- Barrett, J. H. (Ed.). (2003). Contact, continuity, and collapse: The Norse colonization of the North Atlantic (Arneborg, J., "Norse Greenland: Reflections on settlement and depopulation"). Brepols. doi:10.1484/m.sem-eb.6.09070802050003050102090104
- Buckland, P. C., Amorosi, T., Barlow, L. K., Dugmore, A. J., Mayewski, P. A., McGovern, T. H., Ogilvie, A. E. J., Sadler, J. P., & Skidmore, P. (1996). Bioarchaeological and climatological evidence for the fate of Norse farmers in medieval Greenland. Antiquity, 70(267), 88–96. doi:10.1017/s0003598x00082910
- Diamond, J. (2005). Collapse: How societies choose to fail or succeed (ch. 7, "Norse Greenland's flowering"; ch. 8, "Norse Greenland's end"). Viking.
- Dugmore, A. J., Keller, C., & McGovern, T. H. (2007). Norse Greenland settlement: Reflections on climate change, trade, and the contrasting fates of human settlements in the North Atlantic islands. Arctic Anthropology, 44(1), 12–36. doi:10.1353/arc.2011.0038
- Dugmore, A. J., McGovern, T. H., Vésteinsson, O., Arneborg, J., Streeter, R., & Keller, C. (2012). Cultural adaptation, compounding vulnerabilities and conjunctures in Norse Greenland. Proceedings of the National Academy of Sciences, 109(10), 3658–3663. doi:10.1073/pnas.1115292109
- Fitzhugh, W. W., & Ward, E. I. (Eds.). (2000). Vikings: The North Atlantic saga. Smithsonian Institution Press.
- Fredskild, B., & Humle, L. (1991). Plant remains from the Norse farm Sandnes in the Western Settlement, Greenland. Acta Borealia, 8(1), 69–81. doi:10.1080/08003839108580400
- Frei, K. M., Coutu, A. N., Smiarowski, K., Harrison, R., Madsen, C. K., Arneborg, J., Frei, R., Guðmundsson, G., Sindbæk, S. M., Woollett, J., Hartman, S., Hicks, M., & McGovern, T. H. (2015). Was it for walrus? Viking Age settlement and medieval walrus ivory trade in Iceland and Greenland. World Archaeology, 47(3), 439–466. doi:10.1080/00438243.2015.1025912
- Ingstad, H. (1966). Land under the Pole Star: A voyage to the Norse settlements of Greenland and the saga of the people that vanished (N. Walford, Trans.). St. Martin's Press.
- Jones, G. (1964). The Norse Atlantic saga: Being the Norse voyages of discovery and settlement to Iceland, Greenland, America. Oxford University Press.
- Krogh, K. J. (1967). Viking Greenland: With a supplement of saga texts (H. Fogh & G. Jones, Trans.). National Museum.
- Ledger, P. M., Edwards, K. J., & Schofield, J. E. (2014). Vatnahverfi: A green and pleasant land? Palaeoecological reconstructions of environmental and land-use change. Journal of the North Atlantic, Special Volume 6, 29–46. doi:10.3721/037.002.sp605
- Lynnerup, N. (1998). The Greenland Norse: A biological-anthropological study. Meddelelser om Grønland. Man & Society, 24. doi:10.7146/mog-ms.v24.146787
- Madsen, C. K. (2019). Marine shielings in medieval Norse Greenland. Arctic Anthropology, 56(1), 119–159. doi:10.3368/aa.56.1.119
- McGovern, T. H. (1980). Cows, harp seals, and churchbells: Adaptation and extinction in Norse Greenland. Human Ecology, 8(3), 245–275. doi:10.1007/BF01561026
- McGovern, T. H. (1990). The archeology of the Norse North Atlantic. Annual Review of Anthropology, 19(1), 331–351. doi:10.1146/annurev.an.19.100190.001555
- Nedkvitne, A. (2018). Norse Greenland: Viking peasants in the Arctic. Routledge. doi:10.4324/9781351259606
- Nørlund, P. (1936). Viking settlers in Greenland and their descendants during five hundred years. Cambridge University Press; G. E. C. Gads Forlag.
- Seaver, K. A. (1996). The frozen echo: Greenland and the exploration of North America, ca. A.D. 1000–1500. Stanford University Press. doi:10.1515/9781503615731
- Seaver, K. A. (2004). Maps, myths, and men: The story of the Vinland map (ch. 2, "The Norse in and near North America", pp. 19–86). Stanford University Press. doi:10.1515/9781503624696
- Seaver, K. A. (2010). The last Vikings: The epic story of the great Norse voyages. I.B. Tauris.
- Star, B., Barrett, J. H., Gondek, A. T., & Boessenkool, S. (2018). Ancient DNA reveals the chronology of walrus ivory trade from Norse Greenland. Proceedings of the Royal Society B: Biological Sciences, 285(1884), 20180978. doi:10.1098/rspb.2018.0978
- Vebæk, C. L. (1992). Vatnahverfi: An inland district of the Eastern Settlement in Greenland. Meddelelser om Grønland. Man & Society, 17. doi:10.7146/mog-ms.v17.146759
- Vebæk, C. L. (1993). Narsaq: A Norse landnáma farm. Meddelelser om Grønland. Man & Society, 18. doi:10.7146/mog-ms.v18.146760

=== Colonial period (1721–1953) ===
- Beukel, E., Jensen, F. P., & Rytter, J. E. (2010). Phasing out the colonial status of Greenland: A historical study. Meddelelser om Grønland. Man & Society, 37. doi:10.7146/mog-ms.v37.147068
- Briggs, H. W. (1941). The validity of the Greenland agreement. American Journal of International Law, 35(3), 506–513. JSTOR 2192457
- Changes in the Greenland administration. (1939). Polar Record, 3(17), 25. doi:10.1017/s0032247400038122
- Dunbar, M. J. (1950). Greenland during and since the Second World War. International Journal, 5(2), 121. JSTOR 40194266
- Hyde, C. C. (1933). The case concerning the legal status of Eastern Greenland. American Journal of International Law, 27(4), 732–738. JSTOR 2190118
- Jensen, E. L. (2004). Uiarnerit: A historical study of immigration from East to West Greenland in the nineteenth century. Études/Inuit/Studies, 26(2), 23–46. doi:10.7202/007644ar
- Naum, M., & Nordin, J. M. (Eds.). (2013). Scandinavian colonialism and the rise of modernity: Small time agents in a global arena. Springer. doi:10.1007/978-1-4614-6202-6
- Nellemann, G. (1969). Hinrich Rink and applied anthropology in Greenland in the 1860's. Human Organization, 28(2), 166–174. doi:10.17730/humo.28.2.w777u027q529m114
- Nielsen, F. (1951). Planned reforms in Greenland. Arctic, 4(1), 12–17. doi:10.14430/arctic3931
- Olesen, T. B. (2013). Between facts and fiction: Greenland and the question of sovereignty 1945–1954. New Global Studies, 7(2), 117–128. doi:10.1515/ngs-2013-012
- Priebe, J. (2016). From Siam to Greenland: Danish economic imperialism at the turn of the twentieth century. Journal of World History, 27(4), 619–640. doi:10.1353/jwh.2016.0129
- Rasmussen, H.-E. (1987). On socio-genealogies in South West Greenland, 1750–1950: Some explanatory sketches. Acta Borealia, 4(1–2), 43–52. doi:10.1080/08003838708580341
- Rud, S. (2009). A correct admixture: The ambiguous project of civilising in nineteenth-century Greenland. Itinerario, 33(2), 29–44. doi:10.1017/s0165115300003089
- Rud, S. (2013). Governance and tradition in nineteenth-century Greenland. Interventions, 16(4), 551–571. doi:10.1080/1369801X.2013.851827
- Rud, S. (2016). The troubled life of an habitual offender in colonial Greenland. Cultural and Social History, 13(1), 99–114. doi:10.1080/14780038.2016.1133506
- Rud, S. (2017). Colonialism in Greenland: Tradition, governance and legacy. Palgrave Macmillan. doi:10.1007/978-3-319-46158-8
- Rytter, J. E. (2008). Self-determination of colonial peoples: The case of Greenland revisited. Nordic Journal of International Law, 77(4), 365–400. doi:10.1163/157181008x374889
- Svarlien, O. (1964). The Eastern Greenland case in historical perspective. University of Florida Press.
- Vaughan, R. (1991). Northwest Greenland: A history. University of Maine Press.

=== Danish county (1953–1979) ===
- Abildgaard, M. S. (2025). Pacing modernity: Infrastructural time and the modernization of telecommunication in Greenland. Arctic Anthropology, 60(1), 86–100. doi:10.3368/aa.60.1.86
- Brøsted, J., & Gulløv, H. C. (1977). Recent trends and issues in the political development of Greenland. Arctic, 30(2). doi:10.14430/arctic2687
- Dahl, J. (2010). Identity, urbanization and political demography in Greenland. Acta Borealia, 27(2), 125–140. doi:10.1080/08003831.2010.527528
- Derksen, A. (2022). The "Greenlandization" of care: Disability in postcolonial Greenland, 1950s–1980s. European Journal for the History of Medicine and Health, 79(2), 404–435. doi:10.1163/26667711-bja10021
- Foighel, I. (1979). Home rule in Greenland 1979. Nordic Journal of International Law, 48(1–4), 4–14. doi:10.1163/187529379x00027
- Home rule for Greenland. (1979). Polar Record, 19(122), 504–511. doi:10.1017/s0032247400002515
- Huggan, G., & Jensen, L. (Eds.). (2016). Postcolonial perspectives on the European High North: Unscrambling the Arctic (Andersen, A., Jensen, L., & Hvenegård-Lassen, K., "Qullissat: Historicising and localising the Danish scramble for the Arctic", pp. 93–116). Palgrave Macmillan. doi:10.1057/978-1-137-58817-3
- Jensen, L. (2018). Postcolonial Denmark: Nation narration in a crisis ridden Europe ("Political narratives of the emerging postcolonial North Atlantic", pp. 56–80; "The delusionary art of devolution"; "Greenlandic modernisation and the evolution of development aid"). Routledge. doi:10.4324/9780429491887
- Nielsen, K. H. (2013). Transforming Greenland: Imperial formations in the Cold War. New Global Studies, 7(2), 129–154. doi:10.1515/ngs-2013-013
- Rud, S. (2022). Governing sexual citizens: Decolonization and venereal disease in Greenland. Scandinavian Journal of History, 47(4), 567–586. doi:10.1080/03468755.2021.1991468
- Ørvik, N. (1976). Northern development: Modernization with equality in Greenland. Arctic, 29(2). doi:10.14430/arctic2791
- Scarpa, F. (2024). Danish state interests as foundation for Greenland home rule of 1979: A study of the US central foreign policy files (1973–1979). The Yearbook of Polar Law, 15(1), 84–117. doi:10.1163/22116427_015010005
- Scarpa, F. (2024). Greenland home rule, 1979: Preserving and reinforcing the unity of the realm through the maintenance of Greenland's economic dependency. The Yearbook of Polar Law, 15(1), 118–148. doi:10.1163/22116427_015010006
- Sørensen, A. K. (2007). Denmark–Greenland in the twentieth century. Meddelelser om Grønland. Man & Society, 34. doi:10.7146/mog-ms.v34.147055

=== Self-government (1979–present) ===
- Ackrén, M., & Jakobsen, U. (2015). Greenland as a self-governing sub-national territory in international relations: Past, current and future perspectives. Polar Record, 51(4), 404–412. doi:10.1017/s003224741400028x
- Ackrén, M. (2025). Foreign policy in Greenland: 20 years of development. Routledge. doi:10.4324/9781003387657
- Adler-Nissen, R., & Gad, U. P. (Eds.). (2013). European integration and postcolonial sovereignty games: The EU overseas countries and territories ("Greenland projecting sovereignty – Denmark protecting sovereignty away", pp. 237–254). Routledge. doi:10.4324/9780203076842
- Alfredsson, G. S. (1982). Greenland and the right to self-determination. Nordic Journal of International Law, 51(1), 39–43. doi:10.1163/187529382x00078
- Breum, M. (2018). Cold rush: The astonishing true story of the new quest for the polar North. McGill-Queen's University Press. JSTOR j.ctv36zpjt
- Chen, C. (2022). China's engagement in Greenland: Mutual economic benefits and political non-interference. Polar Research, 41. doi:10.33265/polar.v41.7706
- Foighel, I. (1980). Home rule in Greenland: A framework for local autonomy. Common Market Law Review, 17(1), 91–108. doi:10.54648/cola1980005
- Gad, U. P. (2014). Greenland: A post-Danish sovereign nation state in the making. Cooperation and Conflict, 49(1), 98–118. doi:10.1177/0010836713514151
- Gad, U. P. (2017). National identity politics and postcolonial sovereignty games: Greenland, Denmark, and the European Union. Meddelelser om Grønland. Man & Society, 43. doi:10.7146/mog-ms.v43.150098
- Grydehøj, A. (2016). Navigating the binaries of island independence and dependence in Greenland: Decolonisation, political culture, and strategic services. Political Geography, 55, 102–112. doi:10.1016/j.polgeo.2016.09.001
- Grydehøj, A. (2020). Unravelling economic dependence and independence in relation to island sovereignty: The case of Kalaallit Nunaat (Greenland). Island Studies Journal, 15(1), 89–112. doi:10.24043/isj.101
- Harhoff, F. (1983). Greenland's withdrawal from the European Communities. Common Market Law Review, 20(1), 13–33. doi:10.54648/cola1983002
- Jacobsen, M. (2020). Greenland's Arctic advantage: Articulations, acts and appearances of sovereignty games. Cooperation and Conflict, 55(2), 170–192. doi:10.1177/0010836719882476
- Jacobsen, M., Wæver, O., & Gad, U. P. (Eds.). (2024). Greenland in Arctic security: (De)securitization dynamics under climatic thaw and geopolitical freeze. University of Michigan Press. doi:10.3998/mpub.12676130
- Jakobsen, U., & Larsen, H. (2024). The development of Greenland's self-government and independence in the shadow of the unitary state. The Polar Journal, 14(1), 9–27. doi:10.1080/2154896x.2024.2342117
- Kočí, A., & Baar, V. (2021). Greenland and the Faroe Islands: Denmark's autonomous territories from postcolonial perspectives. Norsk Geografisk Tidsskrift – Norwegian Journal of Geography, 75(4), 189–202. doi:10.1080/00291951.2021.1951837
- Kristensen, K. S., & Rahbek-Clemmensen, J. (Eds.). (2018). Greenland and the international politics of a changing Arctic: Postcolonial paradiplomacy between high and low politics. Routledge. doi:10.4324/9781315162645
- Kunoy, B. (2017). Assertions of entitlement to the outer continental shelf in the central Arctic Ocean. International and Comparative Law Quarterly, 66(2), 367–409. doi:10.1017/s0020589317000069
- Kuokkanen, R. (2017). "To see what state we are in": First years of the Greenland Self-Government Act and the pursuit of Inuit sovereignty. Ethnopolitics, 16(2), 179–195. doi:10.1080/17449057.2015.1074393
- Landriault, M., Pic, P., & Lasserre, F. (2023). Beyond Hans Island: The Canada–Denmark agreement's possible impact on mobility and continental shelves. International Journal, 78(1–2), 243–253. doi:10.1177/00207020231175760
- Lindbjerg, S. L., & Jacobsen, M. (2024). X marks the spot: Dissecting Danish SoMe debates on U.S. interest in Greenland. Polar Geography, 47(4), 258–275. doi:10.1080/1088937X.2024.2376599
- Loukacheva, N. (2007). The Arctic promise: Legal and political autonomy of Greenland and Nunavut. University of Toronto Press. doi:10.3138/9781442684874
- Lyck, L. (1989). Greenland: Ten years of home rule. Polar Record, 25(155), 343–346. doi:10.1017/s0032247400019549
- Marcussen, C., Mørk, F., Funck, T., Lehmann Weng, W., & Pedersen, M. (2015). The continental shelf project of the Kingdom of Denmark: Status and issues. Geological Survey of Denmark and Greenland Bulletin, 33, 41–44. doi:10.34194/geusb.v33.4485
- Olsvig, S. (2022). Greenland's ambiguous action space: Testing internal and external limitations between US and Danish Arctic interests. The Polar Journal, 12(2), 215–239. doi:10.1080/2154896X.2022.2137085
- Paul, M. (2026). Greenland's Arctic paths to independence: Politics and policies in Kalaallit Nunaat, Europe and the United States of America. Routledge. doi:10.4324/9781042005826
- Pincus, R., & Ali, S. H. (Eds.). (2015). Diplomacy on ice: Energy and the environment in the Arctic and Antarctic (Bertelsen, R. G., & Hansen, K. G., "From energy to knowledge? Building domestic knowledge-based sectors around hydro energy in Iceland and Greenland"; Degeorges, D., & Ali, S. H., "Connecting China through 'creative diplomacy': Greenland, Australia, and climate cooperation in polar regions"). Yale University Press. JSTOR j.ctt13x1stj
- Serdy, A. (2020). The long grass at the North Pole. The Yearbook of Polar Law, 12(1), 210–227. doi:10.1163/22116427_012010014
- Skaale, S. (Ed.). (2004). The right to national self-determination: The Faroe Islands and Greenland (Alfredsson, G., "Greenland under Chapter XI of the United Nations Charter: A continuing international law dispute", pp. 49–94; Kleist, M., "The status of the Greenlandic Inuit: Are the Greenlandic Inuit a people, an indigenous people, a minority, or a nation?", pp. 95–122). Martinus Nijhoff. doi:10.1163/9789047414421
- Smith, J. J. P. (2023). Canada: The Arctic's final frontier: Canada and Denmark settle the territorial question of Hans Island. Asia-Pacific Journal of Ocean Law and Policy, 8(1), 156–164. doi:10.1163/24519391-08010009
- Thomsen, R. C. (2023). "Greenlandicness" and nation building in Kalaallit Nunaat. Études Inuit Studies, 47(1–2), 139–161. doi:10.7202/1113387ar
- Wilson, P. (2017). An Arctic "cold rush"? Understanding Greenland's (in)dependence question. Polar Record, 53(5), 512–519. doi:10.1017/s003224741700047x

== Indigenous peoples ==
- Anastario, M., Rink, E., Reimer, G. A., & Peterson, M. (2021). More-than-human intimacies and traditional knowledge among hunting families in Northwest Greenland. Arctic Anthropology, 58(1), 54–65. doi:10.3368/aa.58.1.54
- Bjerregaard, P., & Young, T. K. (1998). The circumpolar Inuit: Health of a population in transition. Munksgaard.
- Freuchen, P. (1961). Book of the Eskimos. World Publishing.
- Gerhardt, H. (2011). The Inuit and sovereignty: The case of the Inuit Circumpolar Conference and Greenland. Politik, 14(1). doi:10.7146/politik.v14i1.27469
- Grønnow, B. (2016). Living at a High Arctic polynya: Inughuit settlement and subsistence around the North Water during the Thule Station period, 1910–53. Arctic, 69(5), 1–15. doi:10.14430/arctic4573
- Harper, K. (2000). Give me my father's body: The life of Minik, the New York Eskimo. Steerforth Press.
- Hastrup, K. (2019). The historicity of health: Environmental hazards and epidemics in Northwest Greenland. Cross-Cultural Research, 53(3), 291–311. doi:10.1177/1069397118806823
- Hastrup, K. (2020). Thule as frontier. Anthropological Journal of European Cultures, 29(1), 1–19. doi:10.3167/ajec.2020.290102
- Hastrup, K. (2023). The end of nature? Inughuit life on the edge of time. Ethnos, 88(1), 13–29. doi:10.1080/00141844.2020.1853583
- Holtved, E. (1967). Contributions to Polar Eskimo ethnography. Meddelelser om Grønland, 182(2).
- Kuokkanen, R. (2019). Restructuring relations: Indigenous self-determination, governance, and gender ("Indigenous self-government structures in Canada, Greenland, and Sápmi", pp. 60–96). Oxford University Press. doi:10.1093/oso/9780190913281.001.0001
- Lynge, F. (1995). Indigenous peoples between human rights and environmental protection: An Arctic perspective. Nordic Journal of International Law, 64(3), 489–494. doi:10.1163/157181095x00823
- Malaurie, J. (1982). The last kings of Thule: With the Polar Eskimos, as they face their destiny (A. Foulke, Trans.). E. P. Dutton. (Original work published 1955)
- Mortensen, B. O. G., & Barten, U. (2017). The Greenland Self-Government Act: The pitfall for the Inuit in Greenland to remain an indigenous people? The Yearbook of Polar Law, 8(1), 103–128. doi:10.1163/22116427_008010008
- Ngiviu, T. (2014). The Inughuit of Northwest Greenland: An unacknowledged indigenous people. The Yearbook of Polar Law, 6(1), 142–161. doi:10.1163/1876-8814_006
- Petersen, R. (2003). Settlements, kinship and hunting grounds in traditional Greenland: A comparative study of local experiences from Upernavik and Ammassalik. Meddelelser om Grønland. Man & Society, 27. doi:10.7146/mog-ms.v27.147013
- Shadian, J. M. (2014). The politics of Arctic sovereignty: Oil, ice, and Inuit governance. Routledge. doi:10.4324/9781315851419
- Sowa, F. (2013). Indigenous peoples and the institutionalization of the Convention on Biological Diversity in Greenland. Arctic Anthropology, 50(1), 72–88. doi:10.3368/aa.50.1.72
- Thalbitzer, W. (Ed.). (1914). The Ammassalik Eskimo: Contributions to the ethnology of the East Greenland natives (Meddelelser om Grønland 39). B. Luno.

== Topics ==
=== Politics and government ===
- Benoit, F., & Martens, G. (1992). Municipal government in Greenland. Polar Record, 28(165), 93–104. doi:10.1017/S0032247400013383
- Clegg, P., Stæhr Harder, M. M., Nauclér, E., & Cox Alomar, R. (2022). Parliamentary representation of overseas territories in the metropolis: A comparative analysis. Commonwealth & Comparative Politics, 60(3), 229–253. doi:10.1080/14662043.2022.2065623
- Dahl, J. (1986). Greenland: Political structure of self-government. Arctic Anthropology, 23(1–2), 315–324.
- Demant-Poort, N. (2024). Generalised trust in Greenland: Institutions and identity matter. The Polar Journal, 14(1), 167–189. doi:10.1080/2154896X.2024.2342108
- Stæhr Harder, M. M. (2024). Arctic indigenous representation in national parliaments. The Polar Journal, 14(1), 129–147. doi:10.1080/2154896X.2024.2342123
- Sundberg, J., & Sjöblom, S. (Eds.). (2024). Governing partially independent nation-territories: Evidence from Northern Europe (Ackrén, M., & Jakobsen, U., "The capacity of self-government in Greenland", pp. 135–176). Springer International Publishing. doi:10.1007/978-3-031-54176-6
- Zhang, Y., Wei, X., & Grydehøj, A. (2021). Electoral politics, party performance, and governance in Greenland: Parties, personalities, and cleavages in an autonomous subnational island jurisdiction. Island Studies Journal, 16(1), 343–372. doi:10.24043/isj.146

=== Cold War and military ===
- Archer, C. (1988). The United States defence areas in Greenland. Cooperation and Conflict, 23(3), 123–144. doi:10.1177/001083678802300302
- Berg, M., & Schaefer, B. (Eds.). (2008). Historical justice in international perspective: How societies are trying to right the wrongs of the past (Christensen, S. A., & Kristensen, K. S., "Greenlanders displaced by the Cold War: Relocation and compensation", pp. 111–131). Cambridge University Press.
- Berry, D. A. (2012). Cryolite, the Canadian aluminium industry and the American occupation of Greenland during the Second World War. The Polar Journal, 2(2), 219–235. doi:10.1080/2154896x.2012.735037
- Blyth, J. D. M. (1951). German meteorological activities in the Arctic, 1940–45. Polar Record, 6(42), 185–226. doi:10.1017/S0032247400040596
- Capelotti, P. J. (2026). Lost Greenland: The American desire for an Arctic colony, from Benjamin Franklin to Donald Trump. Springer. doi:10.1007/978-3-032-27841-8
- Danish Institute of International Affairs. (1997). Greenland during the Cold War: Danish and American security policy 1945–68. Danish Institute of International Affairs.
- Fogelson, N. (1989). Greenland: Strategic base on a northern defense line. The Journal of Military History, 53(1), 51. JSTOR 1986019
- Hingitaq 53, Petersen and others v. Office of the Prime Minister of Denmark. (2011). International Law Reports, 143, 277–298. doi:10.1017/cbo9780511675805.007
- Howarth, D. (2001). The sledge patrol. Lyons Press.
- Jensen, J. F., & Krause, T. (2012). Wehrmacht occupations in the new world: Archaeological and historical investigations in Northeast Greenland. Polar Record, 48(3), 269–279. doi:10.1017/s0032247411000180
- Lidegaard, B. (2003). Defiant diplomacy: Henrik Kauffmann, Denmark, and the United States in World War II and the Cold War, 1939–1958. Peter Lang.
- Nielsen, K. H., & Nielsen, H. (2021). Camp Century: The untold story of America's secret Arctic military base under the Greenland ice. Columbia University Press. doi:10.7312/niel20176
- Novak, T. D. (2005). Life and death on the Greenland patrol, 1942 (P. J. Capelotti, Ed.). University Press of Florida.
- Olesen, T. B. (2011). Tango for Thule: The dilemmas and limits of the "neither confirm nor deny" doctrine in Danish-American relations, 1957–1968. Journal of Cold War Studies, 13(2), 116–147. doi:10.1162/JCWS_a_00108
- Petersen, N. (1998). Negotiating the 1951 Greenland defense agreement: Theoretical and empirical aspects. Scandinavian Political Studies, 21(1), 1–28. doi:10.1111/j.1467-9477.1998.tb00001.x
- Petersen, N. (1998). The H. C. Hansen paper and nuclear weapons in Greenland. Scandinavian Journal of History, 23(1–2), 21–44. doi:10.1080/03468759850116007
- Petersen, N. (2008). The iceman that never came: 'Project Iceworm', the search for a NATO deterrent, and Denmark, 1960–1962. Scandinavian Journal of History, 33(1), 75–98. doi:10.1080/03468750701449554
- Petersen, N. (2011). SAC at Thule: Greenland in U.S. polar strategy. Journal of Cold War Studies, 13(2), 90–115. doi:10.1162/jcws_a_00138
- Petersen, N. (2013). The politics of US military research in Greenland in the early Cold War. Centaurus, 55(3), 294–318. doi:10.1111/1600-0498.12023
- Spiermann, O. (2004). Hingitaq 53, Qajutaq Petersen, and others v. Prime Minister's Office. American Journal of International Law, 98(3), 572–578. JSTOR 3181648
- Taagholt, J., & Hansen, J. C. (2001). Greenland: Security perspectives (D. Lufkin, Trans.). Arctic Research Consortium of the United States. (Original work published 1999)

=== Proposed United States acquisition ===
- Allin, D. H. (2026). From the archives: Return to Greenland. Survival, 68(1), 159–164. doi:10.1080/00396338.2026.2620297
- Anderson, S. R. (2019, August 16). Why Trump can't buy Greenland. Lawfare.
- Cambou, D. C. (2020). Disentangling the conundrum of self-determination and its implications in Greenland. Polar Record, 56, e3. doi:10.1017/S0032247420000169
- Duhaime, G., Poppel, B., Poppel, M., & Dorais, L.-J. (2026). Dragged to the ballroom: Greenland and the American threat of annexation. Journal of the British Academy, 14. doi:10.5871/jba/014.a31
- Gricius, G. (2025). Constructing low tension: The role of experts and narratives in the case of Greenland. Cooperation and Conflict, 60(4), 647–674. doi:10.1177/00108367251364175
- Johnstone, R. L. (2020). From the Indian Ocean to the Arctic: What the Chagos Archipelago advisory opinion tells us about Greenland. The Yearbook of Polar Law, 12(1), 308–327. doi:10.1163/22116427_012010019
- LaFortune, G., & Landriault, M. (2024). The coverage from Russian press agencies of the Greenland purchase story. The Polar Journal, 14(1), 333–349. doi:10.1080/2154896X.2024.2342115
- Lucht, H. (2025). Trump, Greenland and fear of freedom. Anthropology Today, 41(6), 1–3. doi:10.1111/1467-8322.70033
- Mabbett, D. (2025). Buying Greenland. The Political Quarterly, 96(1), 5–7. doi:10.1111/1467-923X.13507
- Pertile, M. (2026). Three legal tools to address the US "proposal" of acquisition of Greenland: Cession, the Svalbard Treaty model, and the case for a sui generis treaty. Nordic Journal of International Law, 95(2), 278–304. doi:10.1163/15718107-bja10120
- President Trump demands that Denmark sell Greenland to the United States, threatening to take it by force. (2026). American Journal of International Law, 120(3), 574–582. doi:10.1017/ajil.2026.10173
- Rahbek-Clemmensen, J. (2026). How subnational political entities can gain and exercise power in defense and security policy: The case of Greenland. Cooperation and Conflict. Advance online publication. doi:10.1177/00108367261459292
- Søndergaard, R. S., & Maitra, S. (2026, January 28). A better Greenland deal: How to turn Trump's tantrum into a win for everyone. Foreign Affairs.
- Verbuyst, R., & Veracini, L. (2026). South Africa, Gaza, Greenland: Trump 2.0 and the global settler colonial imaginary. Globalizations. Advance online publication. doi:10.1080/14747731.2026.2658901
- Xu, L. (2026). Awkward geopolitics: US President Trump's proposal to acquire Greenland. Geopolitics. Advance online publication. doi:10.1080/14650045.2026.2696906

=== Law and justice ===
- Blanchard, E., Bloembergen, M., & Lauro, A. (Eds.). (2017). Policing in colonial empires: Cases, connections, boundaries (ca. 1850–1970) (Rud, S., "Policing and governance in Greenland: Rationalities of police and colonial rule 1860–1953", pp. 177–196). Peter Lang. doi:10.3726/b10589
- Christensen, M. R., Thomsen, A. H., Høyer, C. B., Gregersen, M., & Banner, J. (2016). Homicide in Greenland 1985–2010. Forensic Science, Medicine, and Pathology, 12(1), 40–49. doi:10.1007/s12024-015-9729-x
- Frantzsen, E. (2012). Indefinitely sentenced to Denmark: The return to Greenland. Journal of Scandinavian Studies in Criminology and Crime Prevention, 13(sup1), 57–68. doi:10.1080/14043858.2012.738629
- Goldschmidt, V. (1956). The Greenland criminal code and its sociological background. Acta Sociologica, 1(1), 217–255. doi:10.1177/000169935600100117
- Goldschmidt, V. (1969). Problems on changing criminal law in West Greenland. Archives of Environmental Health, 18(1), 122–126. doi:10.1080/00039896.1969.10665378
- Holck, L., & Muhr, S. L. (2022). From institutionalized othering to disruptive collaboration: A postcolonial analysis of the police force in Greenland. Equality, Diversity and Inclusion: An International Journal, 41(7), 993–1013. doi:10.1108/EDI-01-2018-0018
- Larsen, F. B. (1996). Greenland criminal justice: The adaptation of western law. International Journal of Comparative and Applied Criminal Justice, 20(2), 277–290. doi:10.1080/01924036.1996.9678577
- Lauritsen, A. N. (2012). Greenland's open institution: Imprisonment in a land without prisons. Journal of Scandinavian Studies in Criminology and Crime Prevention, 13(sup1), 47–56. doi:10.1080/14043858.2012.738633
- Lynge, I. (1979). The Greenland criminal code and psychiatry. International Journal of Law and Psychiatry, 2(1), 113–119. doi:10.1016/0160-2527(79)90034-7
- Morse, B. W., & Woodman, G. R. (Eds.). (1987). Indigenous law and the state (Schechter, E. J., "Institutionalizing criminality in Greenland", pp. 421–440). De Gruyter. doi:10.1515/9783110854800

=== Economy ===
- Caulfield, R. A. (1993). Aboriginal subsistence whaling in Greenland: The case of Qeqertarsuaq municipality in West Greenland. Arctic, 46(2). doi:10.14430/arctic1336
- Caulfield, R. A. (1997). Greenlanders, whales, and whaling: Sustainability and self-determination in the Arctic. University Press of New England. doi:10.1349/ddlp.777
- Christensen, L., Nielsen, O. A., Rich, J., & Knudsen, M. (2020). Optimizing airport infrastructure for a country: The case of Greenland. Research in Transportation Economics, 79, 100773. doi:10.1016/j.retrec.2019.100773
- Christiansen, H. C. (1968). The Greenland fur industry. Polar Record, 14(90), 287–292. doi:10.1017/S0032247400059088
- Hale, T. N., & Ali, S. H. (2025). Mineral diplomacy in Greenland: Learning from US-European history of engagement at the Ivittuut cryolite mine. Frontiers in Political Science, 7, 1584988. doi:10.3389/fpos.2025.1584988
- Hall, D. (2021). Tourism, climate change and the geopolitics of Arctic development: The critical case of Greenland. CABI. doi:10.1079/9781789246728.0000
- Hamilton, L. C., Brown, B. C., & Rasmussen, R. O. (2003). West Greenland's cod-to-shrimp transition: Local dimensions of climatic change. Arctic, 56(3), 271–282. doi:10.14430/arctic623
- Høgedahl, L. (Ed.). (2021). Greenland's economy and labour markets. Routledge. doi:10.4324/9781003054634
- Jackson, G. (2004). The British whaling trade (ch. 3, "The rise of the Greenland trade, 1750–1783"; ch. 4, "The boom in the northern fishery, 1783–c. 1808"; ch. 6, "Decline in the north in the early nineteenth century"; ch. 8, "The end of the northern fishery in the late nineteenth century"). Liverpool University Press. doi:10.5949/liverpool/9780973007398.001.0001
- Jacobsen, R. B., & Raakjær, J. (2012). A case of Greenlandic fisheries co-politics: Power and participation in total allowable catch policy-making. Human Ecology, 40(2), 175–184. doi:10.1007/s10745-012-9458-7
- Jensen, F., Hoff, A., Jacobsen, J. B., & Meilby, H. (2024). Long-run management of Greenland's fishery on Greenland halibut (Reinhardtius hippoglossoides). Environment and Development Economics, 29(1), 39–62. doi:10.1017/S1355770X23000128
- Johnston, M. E., & Viken, A. (1997). Tourism development in Greenland. Annals of Tourism Research, 24(4), 978–982. doi:10.1016/s0160-7383(97)00034-0
- Lyck, L., & Taagholt, J. (1987). Greenland: Its economy and resources. Arctic, 40(1), 50–59. doi:10.14430/arctic1746
- Lynge, F. (1992). Arctic wars, animal rights, endangered peoples (M. Stenbaek, Trans.). University Press of New England.
- Marquardt, O., & Caulfield, R. A. (1996). Development of West Greenlandic markets for country foods since the 18th century. Arctic, 49(2), 107–119. doi:10.14430/arctic1189
- Nuttall, M. (1990). Animal rights and Greenlandic sealing: A threat to culture survival. Polar Record, 26(158), 240–242. doi:10.1017/S0032247400011529
- Oslund, K. (2016). Greenland in the center: What happened when the Danish–Norwegian officials met English and Dutch whalers in Disko Bay, 1780–1820. Acta Borealia, 33(1), 81–99. doi:10.1080/08003831.2016.1166336
- Poole, G. (1990). Fisheries policy and economic development in Greenland in the 1980s. Polar Record, 26(157), 109–118. doi:10.1017/S0032247400011153
- Priebe, J. (2024). Glacial energy futures? The history of unbuilt hydropower in Greenland from the 1950s to the 1970s. Water History, 16(2–3), 271–290. doi:10.1007/s12685-024-00351-8
- Ross, W. G. (1985). Arctic whalers, icy seas: Narratives of the Davis Strait whale fishery. Irwin Publishing.
- Schokkenbroek, J. C. A. (2007). Too hot to handle? Dutch whaling and seal hunting in the Arctic during the nineteenth century, 1815–1885. The Northern Mariner, 17(2), 23–37. doi:10.25071/2561-5467.370
- Schokkenbroek, J. C. A. (2008). Trying-out: An anatomy of Dutch whaling and sealing in the nineteenth century, 1815–1885. Amsterdam University Press. JSTOR j.ctt6wp5sg
- Snyder, H. T., Stone, S., Albert, M., & Polashenski, C. (2024). Are Greenland's inshore halibut fishers ready for individual transferable quotas? Marine Policy, 159, 105932. doi:10.1016/j.marpol.2023.105932
- Strøm Tejsen, A. V. (1977). The history of the Royal Greenland Trade Department. Polar Record, 18(116), 451–474. doi:10.1017/S0032247400000942

=== Society and culture ===
- Arnfred, S. (1994). Investigating gender in the Greenland process of modernization. NORA – Nordic Journal of Feminist and Gender Research, 2(1), 12–27. doi:10.1080/08038740.1994.9959653
- Arnfred, S., & Pedersen, K. B. (2015). From female shamans to Danish housewives: Colonial constructions of gender in Greenland, 1721 to ca. 1970. NORA – Nordic Journal of Feminist and Gender Research, 23(4), 282–302. doi:10.1080/08038740.2015.1094128
- Buijs, C. (2004). Furs and fabrics: Transformations, clothing and identity in East Greenland. CNWS Publications.
- Buijs, C., & Petersen, M. (2006). Festive clothing and national costumes in 20th century East Greenland. Études/Inuit/Studies, 28(1), 83–107. doi:10.7202/012641ar
- Dahl, J. (2000). Saqqaq: An Inuit hunting community in the modern world. University of Toronto Press. doi:10.3138/9781442679573
- Dybbroe, S. (2009). Is the Arctic really urbanising? Études/Inuit/Studies, 32(1), 13–32. doi:10.7202/029817ar
- Flora, J. (2019). Wandering spirits: Loneliness and longing in Greenland. University of Chicago Press. doi:10.7208/chicago/9780226610733.001.0001
- Grønnow, B. (2009). Blessings and horrors of the interior: Ethno-historical studies of Inuit perceptions concerning the inland region of West Greenland. Arctic Anthropology, 46(1–2), 191–201. doi:10.1353/arc.0.0027
- Hanrahan, M. (2017). Enduring polar explorers' Arctic imaginaries and the promotion of neoliberalism and colonialism in modern Greenland. Polar Geography, 40(2), 102–120. doi:10.1080/1088937X.2017.1303754
- Heath, J. D., & Arima, E. (2004). Eastern Arctic kayaks: History, design, technique. University of Alaska Press.
- King, J. C. H., Pauksztat, B., & Storrie, R. (Eds.). (2005). Arctic clothing of North America: Alaska, Canada, Greenland (Petrussen, F., "Arctic clothing from Greenland", pp. 45–47; Buijs, C., "Clothing as a visual representation of identities in East Greenland", pp. 108–114). McGill-Queen's University Press. doi:10.1515/9780773573284
- Langgård, K. (2015). Greenlandic attitudes towards Norwegians and Danes from Nansen's icecap crossing to the 1933 World Court verdict in The Hague. Études/Inuit/Studies, 38(1–2), 53–71. doi:10.7202/1028853ar
- Marquardt, O. (2004). Greenland's demography, 1700–2000: The interplay of economic activities and religion. Études/Inuit/Studies, 26(2), 47–69. doi:10.7202/007645ar
- Nuttall, M. (1992). Arctic homeland: Kinship, community and development in northwest Greenland. Belhaven Press.
- Pedersen, B. K. (2009). Young Greenlanders in the urban space of Nuuk. Études/Inuit/Studies, 32(1), 91–105. doi:10.7202/029821ar
- Poppel, M. K. (2015). Are women taking over power and labour from men? Gender relations in pre- and post-colonial Greenland. NORA – Nordic Journal of Feminist and Gender Research, 23(4), 303–312. doi:10.1080/08038740.2015.1091546
- Ren, C., & Fusté-Forné, F. (2024). Food, national identity and tourism in Greenland. Food, Culture & Society, 27(1), 69–93. doi:10.1080/15528014.2023.2199667
- Sejersen, F. (2004). Horizons of sustainability in Greenland: Inuit landscapes of memory and vision. Arctic Anthropology, 41(1), 71–89. doi:10.1353/arc.2011.0019
- Steenholdt, N. C. (2021). Subjective well-being and the importance of nature in Greenland. Arctic Anthropology, 58(1), 66–79. doi:10.3368/aa.58.1.66
- Thomsen, R. C., Ren, C., & Mahadevan, R. (2018). "We are the Arctic": Identities at the Arctic Winter Games 2016. Arctic Anthropology, 55(1), 105–118. doi:10.3368/aa.55.1.105
- Vitale, E. (2025). Approaching the past through practice: Reconstruction of a historical Greenlandic dog sled. American Antiquity, 90(1), 18–31. doi:10.1017/aaq.2024.65
- Williamson, K. J. (2011). Inherit my heaven: Kalaallit gender relations. Government of Greenland; Inussuk Arctic Journal.

==== Health ====
- Bjerregaard, P., & Curtis, T. (2002). Cultural change and mental health in Greenland: The association of childhood conditions, language, and urbanization with mental health and suicidal thoughts among the Inuit of Greenland. Social Science & Medicine, 54(1), 33–48. doi:10.1016/s0277-9536(01)00005-3
- Bjerregaard, P., & Lynge, I. (2006). Suicide: A challenge in modern Greenland. Archives of Suicide Research, 10(2), 209–220. doi:10.1080/13811110600558265
- Bjerregaard, P., & Young, T. K. (Eds.). (2008). Health transitions in Arctic populations (Bjerregaard, P., & Stensgaard, T., "Greenland", pp. 23–38). University of Toronto Press. doi:10.3138/9781442688193
- Helms, P. (1957). Investigations into tuberculosis at Angmagssalik. Meddelelser om Grønland, 161(1), 1–108.
- Ingholt, M. M., Simonsen, L., Mamelund, S.-E., Noahsen, P., & van Wijhe, M. (2024). The 1919–21 influenza pandemic in Greenland. International Journal of Circumpolar Health, 83(1), 2325711. doi:10.1080/22423982.2024.2325711
- Leineweber, M., & Arensman, E. (2003). Culture change and mental health: The epidemiology of suicide in Greenland. Archives of Suicide Research, 7(1), 41–50. doi:10.1080/13811110301570

==== Education ====
- Alarcón López, C., & Lawn, M. (Eds.). (2018). Assessment cultures: Historical perspectives (Buchardt, M., & Ydesen, C., "Testing the culturally deviant of the welfare state: Greenlandic children and the children of labour migrants in Danish minority education, 1960–1970", pp. 165–187). Peter Lang. doi:10.3726/978-3-653-06867-2
- Brincker, B., & Lennert, M. (2026). Nationalism and education in the Arctic: A study of Greenland in the context of the Kingdom of Denmark. Nations and Nationalism. doi:10.1111/nana.70105
- Goldbach, I., & Winther-Jensen, T. (1988). Greenland: Society and education. Comparative Education, 24(2), 257–266. doi:10.1080/0305006880240209
- Niedrig, H., & Ydesen, C. (Eds.). (2011). Writing postcolonial histories of intercultural education (Ydesen, C., "Educating Greenlanders and Germans: Minority education in the Danish Commonwealth, 1945–1970"). Peter Lang. doi:10.3726/978-3-653-02004-5
- Prøitz, T. S., Aasen, P., & Wermke, W. (Eds.). (2023). From education policy to education practice: Unpacking the nexus (Holleufer, S., & Ydesen, C., "Exploring education policy transformations and agency in a postcolonial context: The case of launching the preparation scheme in Greenland in 1961", pp. 109–127). Springer. doi:10.1007/978-3-031-36970-4

==== Arts and media ====
- Harrison, K. (2026). Sonic agencies of climate change: Kalallissut/Greenlandic popular music of global heating. Popular Music, 45(1), 1–15. doi:10.1017/s0261143025101189
- Hatt, M. (2020). Picturing and counter-picturing in mid-nineteenth-century colonial Greenland. Art History, 43(2), 308–335. doi:10.1111/1467-8365.12498
- Hauser, M. (1993). Folk music research and folk music collecting in Greenland. Yearbook for Traditional Music, 25, 136–147. JSTOR 768690
- Hauser, M. (2010). Traditional Inuit songs from the Thule area (Vols. 1–2). Meddelelser om Grønland. Man & Society, 36. doi:10.7146/mog-ms.v36.150183 doi:10.7146/mog-ms.v36.150184
- Kaalund, B. (1983). The art of Greenland: Sculpture, crafts, painting. University of California Press.
- MacKenzie, S., & Westerståhl Stenport, A. (Eds.). (2015). Films on ice: Cinemas of the Arctic (Thisted, K., "Cosmopolitan Inuit: New perspectives on Greenlandic film"). Edinburgh University Press. doi:10.3366/edinburgh/9780748694174.001.0001
- Ravn-Højgaard, S. (2021). Media policy in Greenland. Nordicom Review, 42(s2), 36–52. doi:10.2478/nor-2021-0016
- Thisted, K. (2012). De-framing the indigenous body: Ethnography, landscape and cultural belonging in the art of Pia Arke. Nordlit, (29), 279–298. doi:10.7557/13.2318
- Zolkos, M. (2024). Colonial imagery of "Arctic hysteria" and its resignification in Pia Arke's work of counter-memory. Memory Studies, 17(6), 1646–1663. doi:10.1177/17506980231219585

==== Greenlanders in Denmark ====
- Flora, J. (2017). Different from all the "others": Mobility and independence among Greenlandic students in Denmark. Arctic Anthropology, 54(2), 71–82. doi:10.3368/aa.54.2.71
- Nygaard-Christensen, M., & Bjerge, B. (2021). The construction of "socially marginalised Greenlanders" as a target group in Danish welfare policy and practice. Nordic Journal of Social Research, 12(1), 132–154. doi:10.7577/njsr.3817
- Terpstra, T. K. (2015). Inuit outside the Arctic: Migration, identity and perceptions. Barkhuis. JSTOR j.ctt20d870j

==== LGBTQ topics ====
- Mortensen, K. K., & Maegaard, M. (2019). Meeting the Greenlandic people: Mediated intersections of colonial power, race and sexuality. Discourse, Context & Media, 32, 100348. doi:10.1016/j.dcm.2019.100348
- Price, B. A., Bonsall, J. E., & Khoury, M. (Eds.). (2023). Medieval mobilities: Gendered bodies, spaces, and movements (Price, B. A., "Greenland as a horizon: Approaching queer utopianism in Flóamanna saga", pp. 225–248). Springer International Publishing. doi:10.1007/978-3-031-12647-5
- Rydström, J., & Mustola, K. (Eds.). (2007). Criminally queer: Homosexuality and criminal law in Scandinavia 1842–1999 (ch. 5, Rydström, J., "Greenland and the Faroe Islands 1866–1988: Nordic peripheries", pp. 145–182). Aksant.

==== Religion ====
- Bobé, L. (1952). Hans Egede: Colonizer and missionary of Greenland. Rosenkilde and Bagger.
- Carey, H. M. (2024). Blubber for Bibles: Translating colonialism in Inuit missions, c. 1750–1850. Polar Record, 60, e15. doi:10.1017/S0032247424000093
- Jakobsen, M. D. (1999). Shamanism: Traditional and contemporary approaches to the mastery of spirits and healing (ch. 2, "Early encounters between explorers, missionaries and shamans"; ch. 3, "The Greenlandic angakkoq"). Berghahn Books.
- Jensen, E. L., Raahauge, K., & Gulløv, H. C. (2011). Cultural encounters at Cape Farewell: The East Greenlandic immigrants and the German Moravian Mission in the 19th century. Meddelelser om Grønland. Man & Society, 38. doi:10.7146/mog-ms.v38.150092
- Jensz, F., & Petterson, C. (Eds.). (2021). Legacies of David Cranz's "Historie von Grönland" (1765). Palgrave Macmillan. doi:10.1007/978-3-030-63998-3
- Kleivan, I., & Sonne, B. (1985). Eskimos: Greenland and Canada. E. J. Brill. doi:10.1163/9789004666382
- McLisky, C. (2015). "A hook fast in his heart": Emotion and "true Christian knowledge" in disputes over conversion between Lutheran and Moravian missionaries in early colonial Greenland. Journal of Religious History, 39(4), 575–594. doi:10.1111/1467-9809.12271
- Petterson, C. (2014). The missionary, the catechist and the hunter: Foucault, Protestantism and colonialism. Brill. doi:10.1163/9789004273160
- Sonne, B. (2011). Who's afraid of Kaassassuk? Writing as a tool in coping with changing cosmology. Études/Inuit/Studies, 34(2), 107–127. doi:10.7202/1004072ar
- Sonne, B. (2017). Worldviews of the Greenlanders: An Inuit Arctic perspective. University of Alaska Press. doi:10.5876/9781602233393
- Toft, P. A. (2016). Moravian and Inuit encounters: Transculturation of landscapes and material culture in West Greenland. Arctic, 69(5), 1–13. doi:10.14430/arctic4658

==== Language and literature ====
- Alonso de la Fuente, J. A. (Ed.). (2025). Johannes Balle's Tunumiisut (East Greenlandic) wordlist. Wydawnictwo Uniwersytetu Jagiellońskiego.
- Fortescue, M. (1984). West Greenlandic. Croom Helm.
- Fortescue, M. (1991). Inuktun: An introduction to the language of Qaanaaq, Thule. Institut for Eskimologi, Københavns Universitet.
- Fortescue, M., Jacobson, S. A., & Kaplan, L. (2010). Comparative Eskimo dictionary: With Aleut cognates (2nd ed.). Alaska Native Language Center.
- Fortescue, M. (Ed. & Trans.). (1990). From the writings of the Greenlanders: Kalaallit atuakkiaannit. University of Alaska Press.
- Grønkjær, N., & Slavitt, D. R. (Trans.). (2012). The crooning wind: Three Greenlandic poets. New American Press.
- Holtved, E. (1964). Samuel Kleinschmidt. Arctic, 17(2), 142–144. doi:10.14430/arctic3498
- Jacobsen, U. C. (2023). The entanglements of English in contemporary Greenland. Études Inuit Studies, 47(1–2), 19–40. doi:10.7202/1113382ar
- Kahn, L., & Valijärvi, R.-L. (2022). West Greenlandic: An essential grammar. Routledge. doi:10.4324/9781315160863
- Korneliussen, N. (2018). Crimson (A. Halager, Trans.). Virago. (Original work published 2014)
- Langgård, K. (2008). Oral/past culture and modern technical means in the literature of the twentieth century in Greenland. Acta Borealia, 25(1), 45–57. doi:10.1080/08003830802302885
- Langgård, K., & Thisted, K. (Eds.). (2011). From oral tradition to rap: Literatures of the polar North (Thisted, K., "Greenlandic oral traditions: Collection, reframing and reinvention"; Langgård, K., "Greenlandic literature from colonial times to self-government"). Ilisimatusarfik; Forlaget Atuagkat.
- Leine, K. (2015). The prophets of Eternal Fjord (M. Aitken, Trans.). Liveright. (Original work published 2012)
- Lynge, A. (2009). The veins of the heart to the pinnacle of the mind (K. Norris & M. Stenbaek, Trans.). International Polar Institute.
- Lynge, H. (2017). The will of the unseen (S. Stanley, Trans.). International Polar Institute Press. (Original work published 1938)
- Møller, A. (1988). Language policy and language planning after the establishment of the home rule in Greenland. Journal of Multilingual and Multicultural Development, 9(1–2), 177–179. doi:10.1080/01434632.1988.9994328
- Nuttall, M. (1990). Greenlandic: Political development of an Inuit language. Polar Record, 26(159), 331–333. doi:10.1017/S0032247400011943
- Schultz-Lorentzen, C. W. (1927). Dictionary of the West Greenland Eskimo language. Meddelelser om Grønland, 69.
- Storch, M. (2016). Singnagtugaq: A Greenlander's dream (T. Hutchings, Trans.). International Polar Institute.
- Valijärvi, R.-L., & Kahn, L. (2020). The linguistic landscape of Nuuk, Greenland. Linguistic Landscape, 6(3), 265–296. doi:10.1075/ll.19010.val
- Vervoort, R. (2019). (In)visibility and the Danish body in Sultekunstnerinde (2004), a novel on postcolonial Greenland. Scandinavian Studies, 91(1–2), 205–221. doi:10.3368/sca.91.1-2.0205

==== Mythology and legends ====
- Brantly, S., & DuBois, T. A. (Eds.). (2009). The Nordic storyteller: Essays in honour of Niels Ingwersen (Thisted, K., "Eqqaamavara, I remember: Storytelling in Greenland today"). Cambridge Scholars Publishing.
- Futtrup, D. (1996). The telling of myths and legends from Greenland. New Review of Children's Literature and Librarianship, 2(1), 15–23. doi:10.1080/13614549609510576
- Grove, J. (2009). The place of Greenland in medieval Icelandic saga narrative. Journal of the North Atlantic, Special Volume 2, 30–51. doi:10.3721/037.002.s206
- Helldén, J., Jensen, M. S., & Pettitt, T. (Eds.). (2001). Inclinate aurem: Oral perspectives on early European verbal culture: A symposium (Thisted, K., "The impact of writing on stories collected from nineteenth-century Inuit traditions", pp. 167–210). Syddansk Universitetsforlag.
- Kleivan, I. (1960). Mitârtut: Vestiges of the Eskimo sea-woman cult in West Greenland. Meddelelser om Grønland, 161(5), 1–30.
- Kolodny, A. (2012). In search of first contact: The Vikings of Vinland, the peoples of the Dawnland, and the Anglo-American anxiety of discovery (ch. 2, "Contact and conflict: What the Vinland sagas tell us", pp. 44–102). Duke University Press. doi:10.1215/9780822395539
- Pentikäinen, J. (Ed.). (1996). Shamanism and northern ecology (Petersen, R., "Body and soul in ancient Greenlandic religion", pp. 67–78). De Gruyter. doi:10.1515/9783110811674
- Petersen, R. (1990). On the material element in the supernatural aspect of the former Greenlandic religion. Temenos, 26. doi:10.33356/temenos.6143
- Sonne, B. (1990). The acculturative role of Sea Woman: Early contact relations between Inuit and Whites as revealed in the origin myth of Sea Woman. Meddelelser om Grønland. Man & Society, 13. doi:10.7146/mog-ms.v13.146458
- Thisted, K. (2001). On narrative expectations: Greenlandic oral traditions about the cultural encounter between Inuit and Norsemen. Scandinavian Studies, 73(3), 253–296.
- Vestergaard, T. A. (Ed.). (2001). Shamanism and traditional beliefs (Sonne, B., "Sources of Greenlandic shamanism: Survey and ethnohistorical implications"). Aarhus University Press.
- Zolkos, M. (2023). Mnemonic "boundary objects" and postcolonial restitution. European Journal of Scandinavian Studies, 53(1), 80–98. doi:10.1515/ejss-2023-2003

=== Geography, environment and natural resources ===
==== Geography ====
- Böcher, T. W., Holmen, K., & Jakobsen, K. (1968). The flora of Greenland. P. Haase & Son.
- Born, E. W., & Böcher, J. (2001). The ecology of Greenland. Ministry of Environment and Natural Resources.
- Henriksen, N. (2008). Geological history of Greenland: Four billion years of Earth evolution. Geological Survey of Denmark and Greenland.
- Henriksen, N., Higgins, A. K., Kalsbeek, F., & Pulvertaft, T. C. R. (2009). Greenland from Archaean to Quaternary: Descriptive text to the 1995 geological map of Greenland, 1:2 500 000 (2nd ed.). Geological Survey of Denmark and Greenland Bulletin, 18, 1–126. doi:10.34194/geusb.v18.4993
- Higgins, A. K. (2010). Exploration history and place names of northern East Greenland. Geological Survey of Denmark and Greenland Bulletin, 21, 1–368. doi:10.34194/geusb.v21.4735
- Weidick, A. (1995). Satellite image atlas of glaciers of the world: Greenland (R. S. Williams Jr. & J. G. Ferrigno, Eds.; U.S. Geological Survey Professional Paper 1386-C). U.S. Geological Survey.
- Weidick, A., & Bennike, O. (2007). Quaternary glaciation history and glaciology of Jakobshavn Isbræ and the Disko Bugt region, West Greenland: A review. Geological Survey of Denmark and Greenland Bulletin, 14, 1–78. doi:10.34194/geusb.v14.4985

==== Environment and natural resources ====
- Conkling, P. W., Alley, R. B., Broecker, W. S., & Denton, G. H. (2011). The fate of Greenland: Lessons from abrupt climate change. MIT Press.
- Gotfredsen, A. B., Appelt, M., & Hastrup, K. (2018). Walrus history around the North Water: Human–animal relations in a long-term perspective. Ambio, 47(S2), 193–212. doi:10.1007/s13280-018-1027-x
- Hamilton, L. C., Lyster, P., & Otterstad, O. (2000). Social change, ecology and climate in 20th-century Greenland. Climatic Change, 47(1–2), 193–211. doi:10.1023/A:1005607426021
- Hastrup, K., & Hastrup, F. (Eds.). (2015). Waterworlds: Anthropology in fluid environments (ch. 13, Hastrup, K., "The North Water: Life on the ice edge in the High Arctic", pp. 279–299). Berghahn Books. doi:10.3167/9781782389460
- Hastrup, K. (2018). A history of climate change: Inughuit responses to changing ice conditions in North-West Greenland. Climatic Change, 151(1), 67–78. doi:10.1007/s10584-016-1628-y
- Hastrup, K., Andersen, A. O., Grønnow, B., & Heide-Jørgensen, M. P. (2018). Life around the North Water ecosystem: Natural and social drivers of change over a millennium. Ambio, 47(S2), 213–225. doi:10.1007/s13280-018-1028-9
- Kjeldsen, K. K., Korsgaard, N. J., Bjørk, A. A., Khan, S. A., Box, J. E., Funder, S., Larsen, N. K., Bamber, J. L., Colgan, W., van den Broeke, M., Siggaard-Andersen, M.-L., Nuth, C., Schomacker, A., Andresen, C. S., Willerslev, E., & Kjær, K. H. (2015). Spatial and temporal distribution of mass loss from the Greenland Ice Sheet since AD 1900. Nature, 528(7582), 396–400. doi:10.1038/nature16183
- Meltofte, H., Christensen, T. R., Elberling, B., Forchhammer, M. C., & Rasch, M. (Eds.). (2008). High-Arctic ecosystem dynamics in a changing climate: Ten years of monitoring and research at Zackenberg Research Station, Northeast Greenland. Academic Press. doi:10.1016/s0065-2504(07)x0001-1
- Nuttall, M. (2012). Imagining and governing the Greenlandic resource frontier. The Polar Journal, 2(1), 113–124. doi:10.1080/2154896X.2012.679563
- Nuttall, M. (2013). Zero-tolerance, uranium and Greenland's mining future. The Polar Journal, 3(2), 368–383. doi:10.1080/2154896X.2013.868089
- Nuttall, M. (2017). Climate, society and subsurface politics in Greenland: Under the great ice. Routledge. doi:10.4324/9781315743844
- Nuttall, M. (2023). The shaping of Greenland's resource spaces: Environment, territory, geo-security. Routledge. doi:10.4324/9781003175421
- Sejersen, F. (2015). Rethinking Greenland and the Arctic in the era of climate change: New northern horizons. Routledge. doi:10.4324/9781315728308
- Thomasen, G. (2021). Non-proliferation at any cost? Greenlandic uranium, Denmark and Euratom, 1958–1985. The International History Review, 43(2), 399–416. doi:10.1080/07075332.2020.1713190

==== Fauna and fisheries ====
- Boertmann, D. (1994). An annotated checklist to the birds of Greenland. Meddelelser om Grønland, Bioscience, 38. doi:10.7146/mogbiosci.v38.142525
- Garrod, D. J. (1966). The west Greenland cod fishery. Polar Record, 13(82), 23–28. doi:10.1017/s0032247400055261
- Hansen, R. G., Borchers, D. L., & Heide-Jørgensen, M. P. (2024). Abundance and distribution of narwhals (Monodon monoceros) on the summering grounds in Greenland between 2007–2019. Frontiers in Marine Science, 11, 1294262. doi:10.3389/fmars.2024.1294262
- Laidre, K. L., Supple, M. A., Born, E. W., Regehr, E. V., Wiig, Ø., Ugarte, F., Aars, J., Dietz, R., Sonne, C., Hegelund, P., Isaksen, C., Akse, G. B., Cohen, B., Stern, H. L., Moon, T., Vollmers, C., Corbett-Detig, R., Paetkau, D., & Shapiro, B. (2022). Glacial ice supports a distinct and undocumented polar bear subpopulation persisting in late 21st-century sea-ice conditions. Science, 376(6599), 1333–1338. doi:10.1126/science.abk2793
- Salomonsen, F. (1950–1951). Grønlands fugle: The birds of Greenland (Vols. 1–3). Ejnar Munksgaard.
- Schmidt, N. M., Pedersen, S. H., Mosbacher, J. B., & Hansen, L. H. (2015). Long-term patterns of muskox (Ovibos moschatus) demographics in high arctic Greenland. Polar Biology, 38(10), 1667–1675. doi:10.1007/s00300-015-1733-9

=== Science ===
- Alley, R., Mayewski, P., Peel, D., & Stauffer, B. (1996). Twin ice cores from Greenland reveal history of climate change, more. Eos, Transactions American Geophysical Union, 77(22), 209–210. doi:10.1029/96eo00142
- Alley, R. B. (2000). The two-mile time machine: Ice cores, abrupt climate change, and our future. Princeton University Press.
- Borm, J., Kodzik, J., & Charbit, S. (2021). Producing and communicating natural history in the long 18th century: Moravian observations concerning Greenland's climate in unpublished sources. Polar Record, 57, e23. doi:10.1017/S0032247421000218
- Bravo, M., & Sörlin, S. (Eds.). (2002). Narrating the Arctic: A cultural history of Nordic scientific practices (Bravo, M., "Measuring Danes and Eskimos"; Harbsmeier, M., "Bodies and voices from Ultima Thule: Inuit explorations of the Kablunat from Christian IV to Knud Rasmussen"; Ries, C. J., "Lauge Koch and the mapping of north east Greenland: Tradition and modernity in Danish Arctic research, 1920–1940"; Thisted, K., "The power to represent: Intertextuality and discourse in Smilla's sense of snow"). Science History Publications.
- Briner, J. P., McKay, N. P., Axford, Y., Bennike, O., Bradley, R. S., de Vernal, A., Fisher, D., Francus, P., Fréchette, B., Gajewski, K., Jennings, A., Kaufman, D. S., Miller, G., Rouston, C., & Wagner, B. (2016). Holocene climate change in Arctic Canada and Greenland. Quaternary Science Reviews, 147, 340–364. doi:10.1016/j.quascirev.2016.02.010
- Dansgaard, W., Johnsen, S. J., Møller, J., & Langway, C. C. (1969). One thousand centuries of climatic record from Camp Century on the Greenland ice sheet. Science, 166(3903), 377–381. doi:10.1126/science.166.3903.377
- Dansgaard, W., Johnsen, S. J., Clausen, H. B., Dahl-Jensen, D., Gundestrup, N. S., Hammer, C. U., Hvidberg, C. S., Steffensen, J. P., Sveinbjörnsdottir, A. E., Jouzel, J., & Bond, G. (1993). Evidence for general instability of past climate from a 250-kyr ice-core record. Nature, 364(6434), 218–220. doi:10.1038/364218a0
- Dansgaard, W. (2004). Frozen annals: Greenland ice sheet research. Niels Bohr Institute, University of Copenhagen.
- Doel, R. E., Harper, K. C., & Heymann, M. (Eds.). (2016). Exploring Greenland: Cold War science and technology on ice. Palgrave Macmillan. doi:10.1057/978-1-137-59688-8
- Gertner, J. (2019). The ice at the end of the world: An epic journey into Greenland's buried past and our perilous future. Random House.
- Greene, M. T. (2015). Alfred Wegener: Science, exploration, and the theory of continental drift (ch. 5, "The polar meteorologist: Greenland, 1906", pp. 93–126; ch. 6, "The Arctic explorer (1): Greenland, 1907–1908", pp. 127–154; ch. 12, "The Arctic explorer (2): Greenland, 1912–1913", pp. 286–313; ch. 19, "Theorist and Arctic explorer: Graz and Greenland, 1928–1929", pp. 538–571; ch. 20, "The expedition leader: Graz and Greenland, 1929–1930", pp. 572–596). Johns Hopkins University Press. doi:10.1353/book.42523
- Grootes, P. M., Stuiver, M., White, J. W. C., Johnsen, S., & Jouzel, J. (1993). Comparison of oxygen isotope records from the GISP2 and GRIP Greenland ice cores. Nature, 366(6455), 552–554. doi:10.1038/366552a0
- Heymann, M., Knudsen, H., Lolck, M. L., Nielsen, H., Nielsen, K. H., & Ries, C. J. (2011). Exploring Greenland: Science and technology in Cold War settings. Scientia Canadensis, 33(2), 11–42. doi:10.7202/1006149ar
- Langway, C. C., Jr. (2008). The history of early polar ice cores. Cold Regions Science and Technology, 52(2), 101–117. doi:10.1016/j.coldregions.2008.01.001
- Martin-Nielsen, J. (2012). The other Cold War: The United States and Greenland's ice sheet environment, 1948–1966. Journal of Historical Geography, 38(1), 69–80. doi:10.1016/j.jhg.2011.09.004
- Martin-Nielsen, J. (2013). Eismitte in the scientific imagination: Knowledge and politics at the center of Greenland. Palgrave Macmillan. doi:10.1057/9781137375988
- Martin-Nielsen, J. (2013). "The deepest and most rewarding hole ever drilled": Ice cores and the Cold War in Greenland. Annals of Science, 70(1), 47–70. doi:10.1080/00033790.2012.721123
- Mayewski, P. A., & White, F. (2002). The ice chronicles: The quest to understand global climate change. University Press of New England.
- Norrgrén, H. (2019). Hans Egede (1686–1758) and the alchemical tradition in Denmark-Norway. Science in Context, 32(3), 285–307. doi:10.1017/S0269889719000267
- Norrgrén, H. (2020). An alchemist in Greenland: Hans Egede (1686–1758) and alchemical practice in the Colony of Hope. Ambix, 67(2), 153–173. doi:10.1080/00026980.2020.1747305

== Exploration ==
- Bloom, L. (1993). Gender on ice: American ideologies of polar expeditions. University of Minnesota Press. doi:10.5749/9780816684403
- Bown, S. R. (2015). White Eskimo: Knud Rasmussen's fearless journey into the heart of the Arctic. Douglas & McIntyre.
- Bryce, R. M. (1997). Cook & Peary: The polar controversy, resolved. Stackpole Books.
- Counter, S. A. (1991). North Pole legacy: Black, white, and Eskimo. University of Massachusetts Press.
- Cruwys, E. (1990). Profile: Knud Rasmussen. Polar Record, 26(156), 27–33. doi:10.1017/s0032247400022737
- Fitzhugh, W. W., & Olin, J. S. (Eds.). (1993). Archeology of the Frobisher voyages. Smithsonian Institution Press.
- Herbert, W. (1989). The noose of laurels: The discovery of the North Pole. Hodder & Stoughton.
- Huntford, R. (1997). Nansen: The explorer as hero. Duckworth.
- Kaalund, N. K. L. (2021). Explorations in the icy north: How travel narratives shaped Arctic science in the nineteenth century. University of Pittsburgh Press. JSTOR j.ctv1m46fj9
- Martin, P. R. (2024). "Kalli in the ship": Inughuit abduction and the shaping of Arctic knowledge. History and Anthropology, 35(5), 1218–1243. doi:10.1080/02757206.2023.2235383
- McGhee, R. (2001). The Arctic voyages of Martin Frobisher: An Elizabethan adventure. McGill-Queen's University Press. doi:10.1515/9780773569508
- Robinson, M. F. (2006). The coldest crucible: Arctic exploration and American culture. University of Chicago Press. doi:10.7208/chicago/9780226721873.001.0001

== Local history ==
- Christensen, J., Carraher, S., Hedwig, T., & Arnfjord, S. (Eds.). (2024). Housing, homelessness, and social policy in the urban North (Arnfjord, S., & Christensen, J., "Regional introduction: Greenland", pp. 247–254; Arnfjord, S., & Christensen, J., "In search of security: Women's homelessness in Nuuk, Greenland", pp. 255–276; Christensen, J., Arnfjord, S., & Aastrup, M.-L., "Welfare colonialism and geographies of homelessness in Nuuk, Greenland", pp. 277–300). University of Toronto Press. doi:10.3138/9781487553753
- Christensen, J., Arnfjord, S., Aastrup, M.-L., & Stephenson, E. (2024). Housing policy, urbanization, and the production of homelessness in Greenland. International Journal on Homelessness, 4(1), 69–86. doi:10.5206/ijoh.2023.3.14324
- David, R. G. (1999). New archaeological sites in the Scoresby Sund fjord complex, East Greenland. Polar Record, 35(193), 135–138. doi:10.1017/s0032247400026474
- Elbo, J. G. (1948). Cryolite and the mine at Ivigtut, West Greenland. Polar Record, 5(35–36), 185–188. doi:10.1017/s003224740003761x
- Gotfredsen, A. B., & Møbjerg, T. (2004). Nipisat: A Saqqaq culture site in Sisimiut, Central West Greenland. Meddelelser om Grønland. Man & Society, 31. doi:10.7146/mog-ms.v31.147038
- Grønnow, B., Meldgaard, M., & Nielsen, J. B. (1983). Aasivissuit: The great summer camp: Archaeological, ethnographical and zoo-archaeological studies of a caribou-hunting site in West Greenland. Meddelelser om Grønland. Man & Society, 5. doi:10.7146/mog-ms.v5.145407
- Grydehøj, A. (2014). Constructing a centre on the periphery: Urbanization and urban design in the island city of Nuuk, Greenland. Island Studies Journal, 9(2), 205–222. doi:10.24043/isj.302
- Hansen, K. (2008). Nuussuarmiut: Hunting families on the big headland: Demography, subsistence and material culture in Nuussuaq, Upernavik, Northwest Greenland. Museum Tusculanum Press. doi:10.26530/oapen_342366
- Hendriksen, K., & Jørgensen, U. (2015). Hunting and fishing settlements in Upernavik district of Northern Greenland: Challenged by climate, centralization, and globalization. Polar Geography, 38(2), 123–145. doi:10.1080/1088937x.2015.1034222
- Huse, T. (2025). Temporal displacement: Colonial architecture and its contestation. International Journal of Housing Policy, 25(3), 430–452. doi:10.1080/19491247.2024.2367827
- Lloyd, T. (1953). Ivigtut cryolite and modern Greenland. The Canadian Geographer, 1(3), 39–52. doi:10.1111/j.1541-0064.1953.tb01724.x
- Nooter, G. (1976). Leadership and headship: Changing authority patterns in an East Greenland hunting community. Brill. doi:10.1163/9789004544949
- Priebe, J. (2018). A modern mine? Greenlandic media coverage on the mining community of Qullissat, western Greenland, 1942–1968. The Polar Journal, 8(1), 141–162. doi:10.1080/2154896x.2018.1468620
- Robert-Lamblin, J. (1986). Ammassalik, East Greenland: End or persistence of an isolate? Anthropological and demographical study on change. Meddelelser om Grønland. Man & Society, 10. doi:10.7146/mog-ms.v10.145717
- Sandell, H. T., & Sandell, B. (1991). Archaeology and environment in the Scoresby Sund fjord: Ethno-archaeological investigations of the last Thule culture of Northeast Greenland. Meddelelser om Grønland. Man & Society, 15. doi:10.7146/mog-ms.v15.146652
- Schmidt, A. L. (2024). An analysis of 600-year-old gut-skin parkas of the Early Thule period from the Nuulliit site, Avanersuaq, Greenland. Arctic Anthropology, 59(2), 107–130. doi:10.3368/aa.59.2.107
- Sørensen, M. (2010). The archaeology of Old Nuulliit: Eigil Knuth's investigations in the Thule region, North Greenland, 1952–1990. Meddelelser om Grønland. Man & Society, 39. doi:10.7146/mog-ms.v39.150094
- Tommasini, D. (2013). Ittoqqortoormiit and the National Park of Greenland: A community's option for tourism development. Polar Record, 49(3), 237–239. doi:10.1017/S0032247412000691

== Historiography and memory ==
- Andersen, A. N. (2020). The Greenland Reconciliation Commission: Moving away from a legal framework. The Yearbook of Polar Law, 11(1), 214–244. doi:10.1163/22116427_011010012
- Andersen, A. N. (2026). "And then move on ...": The context and intentions behind the Greenland reconciliation commission. Rethinking History, 30(2), 266–293. doi:10.1080/13642529.2025.2454195
- Buijs, C. (2016). Museum collection decolonization and indigenous cultural heritage in an island community: East Greenland and the "Roots 2 Share" photo project. Island Studies Journal, 11(2), 537–560. doi:10.24043/isj.366
- Gabriel, M., & Dahl, J. (Eds.). (2008). Utimut: Past heritage – future partnerships: Discussions on repatriation in the 21st century. International Work Group for Indigenous Affairs; Greenland National Museum and Archives.
- Hastrup, K. (2019). Colonial moments in Greenland: Mutable tensions in the contact zone. Itinerario, 43(2), 243–261. doi:10.1017/S0165115319000251
- Hemkendreis, A. (2022). Heroes in miniature: Wandering images of Thule between Greenland and Denmark (1935–1936). Nordlit, 49, 1–12. doi:10.7557/13.6321
- Jensen, L. (2015). Postcolonial Denmark: Beyond the rot of colonialism? Postcolonial Studies, 18(4), 440–452. doi:10.1080/13688790.2015.1191989
- Jensen, L. (2019). Commemoration, nation narration, and colonial historiography in postcolonial Denmark. Scandinavian Studies, 91(1–2), 13–30. doi:10.3368/sca.91.1-2.0013
- Körber, L.-A., & Volquardsen, E. (Eds.). (2014). The postcolonial North Atlantic: Iceland, Greenland and the Faroe Islands. Nordeuropa-Institut der Humboldt-Universität. doi:10.38071/2024-00238-9
- Lekvall, E. (2025). The Danish "coil campaign" in Greenland: Indigenous genocide through forced birth control? Nordic Journal of International Law, 94(3), 270–312. doi:10.1163/15718107-bja10102
- Lubowicka, A. (2019). Mapping Ultima Thule: Representations of North Greenland in the expedition accounts of Knud Rasmussen (P. Poniatowska, Trans.). Peter Lang. doi:10.3726/b16308
- Minton, S. J. (Ed.). (2019). Residential schools and Indigenous peoples: From genocide via education to the possibilities for processes of truth, restitution, reconciliation, and reclamation (Minton, S. J., & Thiesen, H., "Greenland", pp. 95–112). Routledge. doi:10.4324/9780429463044
- Rix, R. W. (2023). The vanished settlers of Greenland: In search of a legend and its legacy. Cambridge University Press. doi:10.1017/9781009359450
- Thisted, K., & Gremaud, A.-S. N. (Eds.). (2020). Denmark and the new North Atlantic: Narratives and memories in a former empire. Aarhus University Press. JSTOR j.ctv35r3t9v
- Thisted, K. (2022). Blame, shame, and atonement: Greenlandic responses to racialized discourses about Greenlanders and Danes. Journal of Critical Mixed Race Studies, 1(2). doi:10.5070/C81258339
- Viljoen, J.-M., & Zolkos, M. (2022). Reimagining cultural memory of the Arctic in the graphic narratives of Oqaluttuaq. Memory Studies, 15(2), 332–354. doi:10.1177/17506980211037283

== Primary sources ==
=== Norse sources ===
- Adam of Bremen. (1959). History of the archbishops of Hamburg-Bremen (F. J. Tschan, Trans.; Book 4). Columbia University Press.
- Grønlie, S. (Trans.). (2006). Íslendingabók; Kristni saga: The book of the Icelanders; The story of the conversion. Viking Society for Northern Research.
- Kunz, K. (Trans.). (2008). The Vinland sagas: The Icelandic sagas about the first documented voyages across the North Atlantic: The saga of the Greenlanders and Eirik the Red's saga. Penguin.
- Larson, L. M. (Trans.). (1917). The king's mirror (Speculum regale – Konungs skuggsjá). American-Scandinavian Foundation.
- Magnusson, M., & Pálsson, H. (Trans.). (1965). The Vinland sagas: The Norse discovery of America. Penguin Books.
- Major, R. H. (Ed.). (1873). The voyages of the Venetian brothers, Nicolò & Antonio Zeno (pp. 37–54, "Description of Greenland in the fourteenth century, by Ivar Bardsen"). Hakluyt Society.
- Pálsson, H., & Edwards, P. (Trans.). (1972). The book of settlements: Landnámabók. University of Manitoba Press.

=== Colonial and missionary accounts ===
- Cranz, D. (1767). The history of Greenland: Containing a description of the country, and its inhabitants (Vols. 1–2). Brethren's Society for the Furtherance of the Gospel among the Heathen.
- Egede, H. (1745). A description of Greenland: Shewing the natural history, situation, boundaries, and face of the country. C. Hitch, S. Austen, and J. Jackson. (Original work published 1741)
- Fabricius, O. (1962). Otto Fabricius' ethnographical works (W. E. Calvert, Trans.; E. Holtved, Ed.). Meddelelser om Grønland, 140(2).
- Gatonbe, J., Hall, J., & Baffin, W. (1897). Danish Arctic expeditions, 1605 to 1620. Hakluyt Society.
- O'Reilly, B. (1818). Greenland, the adjacent seas, and the North-West Passage to the Pacific Ocean, illustrated in a voyage to Davis's Strait, during the summer of 1817. Baldwin, Cradock and Joy.
- Permanent Court of International Justice. (1933). Legal status of Eastern Greenland: Judgment of April 5th, 1933 (Series A/B, No. 53). A. W. Sijthoff.
- Rink, H. (1877). Danish Greenland, its people and its products. H. S. King. (Original work published 1857)
- Rink, H. (1887–1891). The Eskimo tribes: Their distribution and characteristics, especially in regard to language (Vols. 1–2). C. A. Reitzel.
- Saabye, H. E. (1818). Greenland: Being extracts from a journal kept in that country in the years 1770 to 1778. Boosey and Sons.

=== Treaties and legislation ===
- Denmark. (1978). The Greenland Home Rule Act: Act No. 577 of 29 November 1978 [English translation]. Statsministeriet.
- Denmark. (2009). Act on Greenland Self-Government: Act no. 473 of 12 June 2009 [English translation]. Statsministeriet.
- United States, & Denmark. (1951). Defense of Greenland: Agreement between the United States and the Kingdom of Denmark (Treaties and Other International Acts Series No. 2292; United Nations Treaty Series, vol. 2335, pp. 32–53).
- United States, & Denmark. (2004). Defense: Greenland: Agreement between the United States of America and Denmark amending and supplementing the Agreement of April 27, 1951 (Treaties and Other International Acts Series 04-806). U.S. Department of State.
- United States, Denmark, & Greenland. (2026). Agreement between the Government of the United States of America and the Government of the Kingdom of Denmark together with the Government of Greenland to amend and supplement the Agreement of 27 April 1951. Ministry of Foreign Affairs of Denmark.

=== Exploration narratives ===
- Balchen, B., Ford, C., & La Farge, O. (1944). War below zero: The battle for Greenland. Houghton Mifflin.
- Chapman, F. S. (1932). Northern lights: The official account of the British Arctic Air-Route Expedition, 1930–1931. Chatto and Windus.
- Cook, F. A. (1911). My attainment of the Pole: Being the record of the expedition that first reached the boreal center, 1907–1909. Polar Publishing Company.
- Freuchen, P. (1935). Arctic adventure: My life in the frozen North. Farrar & Rinehart.
- Graah, W. A. (1837). Narrative of an expedition to the east coast of Greenland, sent by order of the King of Denmark, in search of the lost colonies. John W. Parker.
- Hayes, I. I. (1867). The open polar sea: A narrative of a voyage of discovery towards the North Pole, in the schooner "United States". Hurd and Houghton.
- Hendrik, H. (1878). Memoirs of Hans Hendrik, the Arctic traveller, serving under Kane, Hayes, Hall and Nares, 1853–1876 (H. Rink, Trans.; G. Stephens, Ed.). Trübner & Co.
- Henson, M. A. (1912). A Negro explorer at the North Pole. Frederick A. Stokes.
- Kane, E. K. (1856). Arctic explorations: The second Grinnell expedition in search of Sir John Franklin, 1853, '54, '55 (Vols. 1–2). Childs & Peterson.
- Koch, L. (1940). Survey of North Greenland. Meddelelser om Grønland, 130(1).
- Mikkelsen, E. (1913). Lost in the Arctic: Being the story of the 'Alabama' expedition, 1909–1912. G. H. Doran.
- Nansen, F. (1890). The first crossing of Greenland (H. M. Gepp, Trans.; Vols. 1–2). Longmans, Green, and Co.
- Nansen, F. (1893). Eskimo life (W. Archer, Trans.). Longmans, Green, and Co.
- Peary, J. D. (1893). My Arctic journal: A year among ice-fields and Eskimos. Contemporary Publishing Company.
- Peary, R. E. (1898). Northward over the "great ice" (Vols. 1–2). F. A. Stokes.
- Rasmussen, K. (1921). Greenland by the polar sea: The story of the Thule expedition from Melville Bay to Cape Morris Jesup. W. Heinemann.
- Scoresby, W., Jr. (1823). Journal of a voyage to the northern whale-fishery: Including researches and discoveries on the eastern coast of West Greenland, made in the summer of 1822, in the ship Baffin of Liverpool. A. Constable and Co.
- Wegener, E. (Ed.). (1939). Greenland journey: The story of Wegener's German expedition to Greenland in 1930–31, as told by members of the expedition and the leader's diary (W. M. Deans, Trans.). Blackie & Son.

=== Oral histories ===
- Mønsted, A. (2026). Re-activating indigenous knowledge from oral history: Landscape and intangible cultural heritage in Greenland. Routledge. doi:10.4324/9781003483373
- Sørensen, M., & Knudsen, P. (2019). The legend of Qajuuttaq: Exploring the potential of Inuit oral history in South Greenland. Arctic Anthropology, 56(2), 63–83. doi:10.3368/aa.56.2.63
- Thiesen, H. (2023). Greenland's stolen indigenous children: A personal testimony (S. J. Minton, Trans. & Ed.). Routledge. doi:10.4324/9781003241843
- Vebæk, M. (2006). The southernmost people of Greenland: Dialects and memories: Qavaat: Oqalunneri eqqaamassaallu. Museum Tusculanum Press. doi:10.26530/OAPEN_342373

=== Oral traditions ===
- Aron of Kangeq. (2020). The native Greenlander: Folktales of Greenland (H. Rink, Ed.; S. Stanley, Trans.). International Polar Institute Press.
- Holtved, E. (1951). The Polar Eskimos: Language and folklore. Meddelelser om Grønland, 152(1–2).
- Rasmussen, K. (1908). The people of the polar North: A record. Kegan Paul, Trench, Trübner.
- Rasmussen, K. (1921). Eskimo folk-tales (W. J. A. Worster, Trans.). Gyldendal.
- Rasmussen, K., & Ostermann, H. (1939). Knud Rasmussen's posthumous notes on East Greenland legends and myths. Meddelelser om Grønland, 109(3).
- Rink, H. (1875). Tales and traditions of the Eskimo, with a sketch of their habits, religion, language and other peculiarities (R. Brown, Ed.). W. Blackwood and Sons. (Original work published 1866)

== Reference works ==
- Damas, D. (Ed.). (1984). Arctic (Handbook of North American Indians, Vol. 5; Gilberg, R., "Polar Eskimo", pp. 577–594; Petersen, R., "East Greenland before 1950", pp. 622–639). Smithsonian Institution.
- Larsen, J. N., & Fondahl, G. (Eds.). (2015). Arctic human development report: Regional processes and global linkages. Nordic Council of Ministers. doi:10.6027/TN2014-567
- Mills, W. J. (2003). Exploring polar frontiers: A historical encyclopedia (Vols. 1–2). ABC-CLIO. doi:10.5040/9798400649110
- Nuttall, M. (Ed.). (2005). Encyclopedia of the Arctic (Vols. 1–3). Routledge. doi:10.4324/9780203997857
- Statistics Greenland. (2025). Greenland in figures 2025 (22nd ed.; N. Kleemann, Ed.). Statistics Greenland.
- Stern, P. R. (2013). Historical dictionary of the Inuit (2nd ed.). Scarecrow Press. doi:10.5040/9798216421474

== See also ==
- Culture of Greenland
- Greenlandic Inuit
- History of Greenland
- Politics of Greenland
