= Timeline of Greenland =

This page is a historical timeline of the island known as Greenland or Kalaallit Nunaat.

== Norwegian colonization and colony ==
978: Snæbjörn galti Hólmsteinsson becomes the first Norseman to intentionally navigate to Greenland.

982: The Norwegian-Icelandic viking known as Eric the Red is banished from Iceland. He sails off and sights the island. He decides to name it Greenland to make the island appear more attractive.

986: Norse settlement of Greenland begins.

1000: Eastern Settlement and Western Settlement established.

1000: Leif Eiriksson departs Greenland for his voyage to what is now Labrador. By now, Christianity is well established on the island.

1263: Greenland then becomes crown dependency of Norway.

1355: In 1355 union king Magnus IV of Sweden and Norway (Magnus VII of Norway; The Swedish king had been crowned king of Norway through birthright) sent a ship (or ships) to Greenland to inspect its Western and Eastern Settlements. Sailors found settlements entirely Norse and Christian. The Greenland carrier (Groenlands Knorr) made the Greenland run at intervals till 1369, when she sank and was apparently not replaced.

c.1500: The last Norse settlements have vanished leaving only the Inuit.

== Danish-Norwegian colony ==
1721: The first Danish settlement is created near present-day Nuuk.

1776: Denmark assumes a full monopoly of trade with the island.

1800s: Greenland is explored and mapped in this period of time.

1814: Norway lost Greenland as a result of the Treaty of Kiel.

== Danish colony ==
1940: Denmark is occupied by Nazi Germany and Greenland is therefore cut off. The United States assumes custody over the island.

1945: Greenland is given back to Denmark but the US and NATO use the island as a base for operations.

1953: Greenland is now integrated with Denmark and has representation in Denmark's parliament.

1968: An American B-52 bomber crashes on the island. But the bomber had four nuclear bombs and the people claim that not all weapons were found.

== Self rule ==
1979: Greenland attains home rule.

1985: Greenland has fully left the European community.

2008: Greenland gains greater autonomy.

2010: Studies conclude that the Greenland ice-sheet is shrinking faster than scientists thought.

== Sources ==
- "Timeline: Greenland." BBC News. BBC, 01 Oct. 2011 https://news.bbc.co.uk/2/hi/europe/1023448.stm
