= Thorvald Eiriksson =

Icelandic explorer

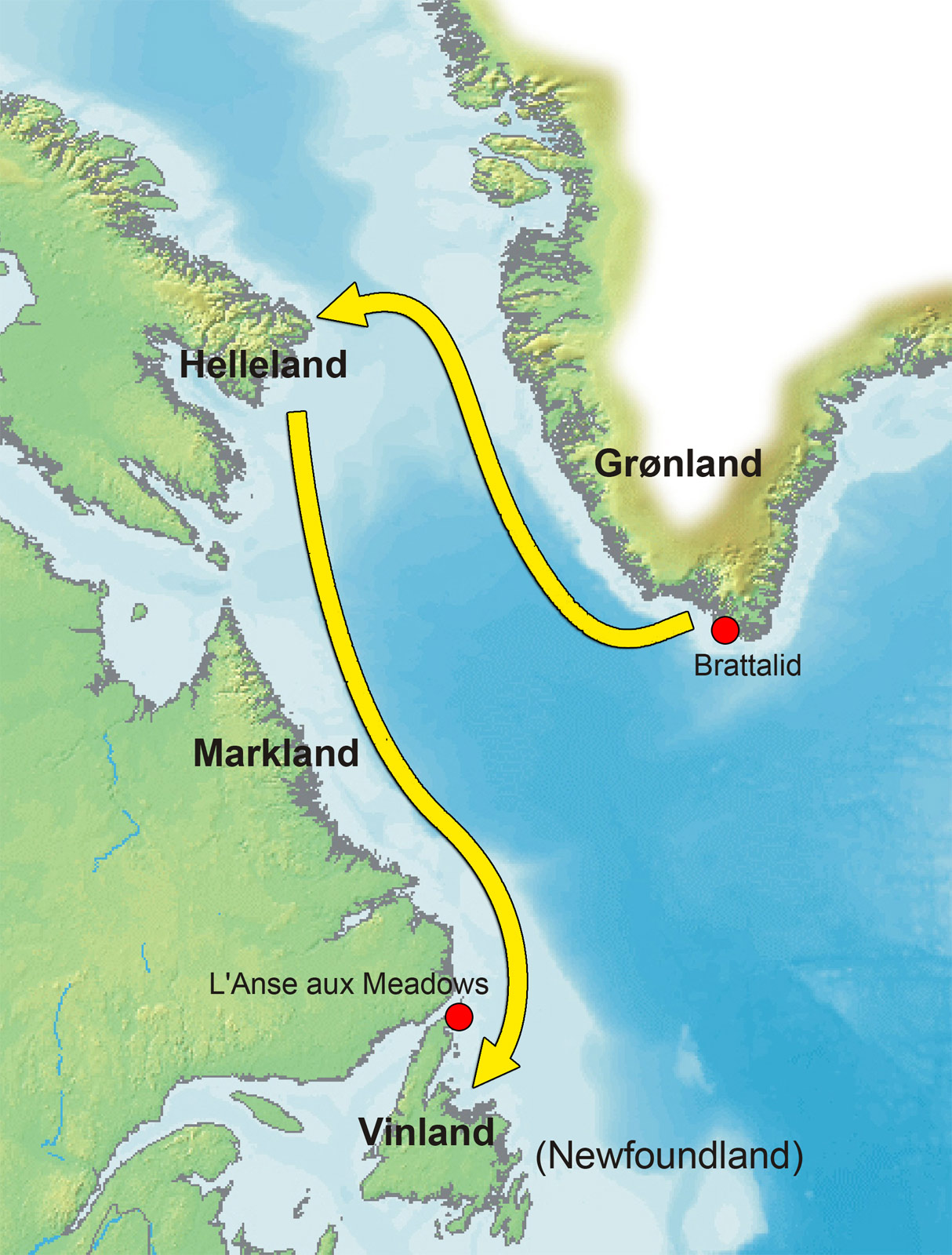
Probable route of travel from Greenland to Vinland

Thorvald Eiriksson (Old Norse: Þórvaldr Eiríksson [ˈθoːrˌwɑldr ˈɛiˌriːksˌson]; Modern Icelandic: Þorvaldur Eiríksson [ˈθɔrˌvaltʏr ˈeiːˌriksˌsɔːn]) was the son of Erik the Red and brother of Leif Erikson. The only Medieval Period source material available regarding Thorvald Eiriksson are the two Vinland sagas; the Greenland Saga and the Saga of Erik the Red. Although differing in various detail, according to both sagas Thorvald was part of an expedition for the exploration of Vinland and became the first European to die in North America outside of Greenland.

The Greenland Saga describes a voyage made by Bjarni Herjolfsson, and the subsequent voyages of Leif Eriksson, his brother Thorvald Eiriksson, his sister Freydís Eiríksdóttir, and the Icelandic merchant Thorfinn Karlsefni. The Saga describes hostilities with Skrælings, the Norse term for the native peoples they met in the lands visited south and west of Greenland which they called Helluland, Markland and Vinland. The Saga of Erik the Red tells the story as a single expedition led by Thorfinn Karlsefni. The voyage of Thorvald Eriksson is told here as part of the Karlsefni expedition.

== See also ==
- Vinland

== Other sources ==
- Brown, Nancy Marie (2012) Song of the Vikings: Snorri and the Making of Norse Myths (Palgrave Macmillan) ISBN 978-0-2303-3884-5
- Haugen, Einar (2007) Voyages To Vinland - The First American Saga Newly Translated And Interpreted (Barzun Press) ISBN 978-1406774993
- Jones, Gwyn (1986) The Norse Atlantic Saga: Being the Norse Voyages of Discovery and Settlement to Iceland, Greenland, and North America (Oxford University Press) ISBN 0-19-285160-8
- Magnusson, Magnus (1973) The Vinland Sagas: The Norse Discovery of America (Penguin Group) ISBN 978-0-1419-0698-0
- Short, William R. (2010) Icelanders in the Viking age: the people of the sagas (McFarland) ISBN 978-0-7864-4727-5
