= Thorvald Asvaldsson =

Norse Viking (floruit 10th century)

Thorvald Ásvaldsson (Old Norse: Þórvaldr Ásvaldsson [ˈθoːrˌwɑldz̠ ˈɑːsˌwɑldsˌson]; Modern Icelandic: Þorvaldur Ásvaldsson [ˈθɔrˌvaltʏr ˈausˌval(t)sˌsɔːn]; fl. 10th century; died before 980) was the father of the first Norse settler of Greenland, Erik the Red, and grandfather of Leif Erikson, who visited North America centuries before Christopher Columbus. Thorvald's father was Ásvald Ulfsson, whose father was Ulf Oxen-Thorisson, whose father was Oxen-Thorir, brother of Naddodd, discoverer of Iceland.

Thorvald Ásvaldsson was born in Norway. He fathered Erik the Red with a woman whose name is unknown. He was exiled from Norway in c. 960, during the reign of King Haakon the Good (son of Harald Fairhair), "because of some killings". He left with his son Erik to northwest Iceland, where he died before 980. According to the "Grænlendinga Saga" (Saga of the Greenlanders), "There was a man called Thorvald, who was the father of Erik the Red. He and Eirik left their home in Jaederen, in Norway, because of some killings and went to Iceland, which had been extensively settled by then "..
