= Erik the Red =

Norse explorer (c. 950 – c. 1003)

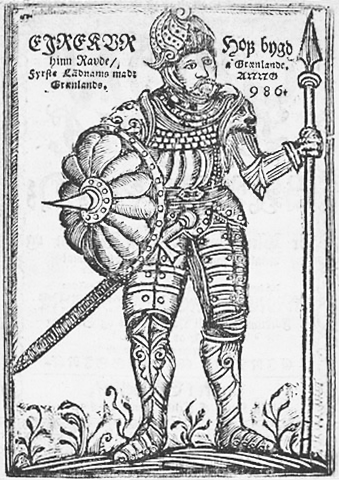
- Erik the Red from Arngrímur Jónsson's Grönlandia. Note anachronistic details in his weapons and armor.
- Born: c. 950; Jæren, Norway
- Died: c. 1003 (aged around 53); Greenland
- Occupations: Settler, explorer
- Known for: Founded the first Norse settlement in Greenland
- Partner: Þjódhild Jorundsdottir
- Children: Freydís, Leif Erikson, Thorvald and Thorstein
- Parent: Thorvald Asvaldsson (father)

Erik Thorvaldsson (Note: Old Norse: Eiríkr Þórvaldsson; Eiríkr hinn rauði; Modern Icelandic: Eiríkur rauði Þorvaldsson; Modern Norwegian: Eirik Raude) (c. 950 – c. 1003), known as Erik the Red (Norwegian: Eirik Raude), was a Norse explorer, described in medieval and Icelandic saga sources as having founded the first European settlement in Greenland. He most likely earned the epithet "the Red" for the color of his hair and beard.

According to Icelandic sagas, Erik was born in the Jæren district of Rogaland, Norway, the son of Thorvald Asvaldsson. When Thorvald was banished from Norway, the family sailed west to Iceland. During Erik's life in Iceland, he married Þjódhild Jorundsdottir and had four children, including Icelandic explorer Leif Erikson. Around the year of 982, Erik was exiled from Iceland for three years, during which time he explored Greenland, eventually culminating in his founding of the first successful European settlement on the island. Erik died there around 1003 CE during a winter epidemic.

== Personal life ==
=== Early life ===
Erik Thorvaldsson was born in Rogaland, Norway in 950 CE, and was the son of Thorvald Asvaldsson (also spelled Osvaldsson). When Thorvald was banished from Norway for committing acts of manslaughter, he sailed west from Norway with his family, including a 10-year-old Erik. They settled in Hornstrandir, in northwestern Iceland, where Thorvald died sometime before 970 CE.

=== Marriage and family ===
After his father's death, Erik married Þjódhild Jorundsdottir and moved to Haukadalr (Hawksdale) where he built a farm called Eiríksstaðir; Þjódhild was the daughter of Jorundur Ulfsson and Þorbjorg Gilsdottir. Medieval Icelandic tradition relates that Erik and his wife Þjódhild had at least three children: three sons, the explorer Leif Erikson, Thorvald and Thorstein. Sources differ on Erik's daughter, Freydís, with The Saga of the Greenlanders describing her as a full sister to Leif, but The Saga of Erik the Red describing her as his half-sister. Unlike his son Leif and his wife Þjóðhildur, who became Christians, Erik remained a follower of Norse paganism. While Erik's wife took heartily to Christianity, even commissioning Greenland's first church, Erik greatly disliked it and stuck to his Norse gods—which, the sagas relate, led Þjódhild to withhold intercourse from her husband.

=== Exile ===
Similar to his father before him, Erik also found himself exiled for a time. The initial confrontation occurred when Erik's thralls (slaves) caused a landslide on a neighboring farm belonging to a man named Valthjof, and Valthjof's kinsman, Eyjolf the Foul, (Note: Old Norse: Eyjólfr saurr; Modern Icelandic: Eyjólfur saur) killed the thralls. In retaliation, Erik killed Eyjolf as well as Hrafn the Dueller (Holmgang-Hrafn). (Note: Old Norse: Hólmgǫngu-Hrafn; Modern Icelandic: Hólmgöngu-Hrafn) Kinsmen of Eyjolf sought legal prosecution and Erik was later banished from Haukadale for killing Eyjolf the Foul around the year 982.

Erik then moved to Brokey and Öxney (Eyxney) island on Breiðafjörður in west Iceland. Erik asked a man named Thorgest to keep his setstokkr—inherited ornamented pillars of significant mystical value—which his father had brought from Norway. When Erik had finished building his new home, he went back to retrieve his pillars from Thorgest; however, Thorgest refused to return them to Erik, and so Erik then went to Breidabolstadr and took the pillars back. As a result, Thorgest and his men gave chase, and in the ensuing fight Erik slew both of Thorgest's sons as well as "some other men". After this conflict both Erik and Thorgest kept close a large number of allies.

Styr gave assistance to Erik, as also did Eyjolf, of Sviney, Thorbjorn Vifilsson, and the sons of Thorbrand, of Alptafjordr (Swanfirth). But the sons of Thord Gellir, as also Thorgeir, of Hitardalr (Hotdale), Aslak, of Langadalr (Longdale), and Illugi, his son, gave assistance to Thorgest.

The dispute between Erik and Thorgest was later resolved at the Thorsnes Thing, where Erik and the men that sided with him were outlawed from Iceland for three years; many of these men would then join Erik on his expedition to Greenland.

=== Death ===
Erik's son Leif Erikson became the first Norseman to explore the land of Vinland—part of North America, presumably near modern-day Newfoundland—and invited his father on the voyage. However, according to the sagas, Erik fell off his horse on the way to the ship and took this as a bad sign, leaving his son to continue without him. Erik later died in an epidemic that killed many of the colonists in the winter after his son's departure.

== Discoveries ==
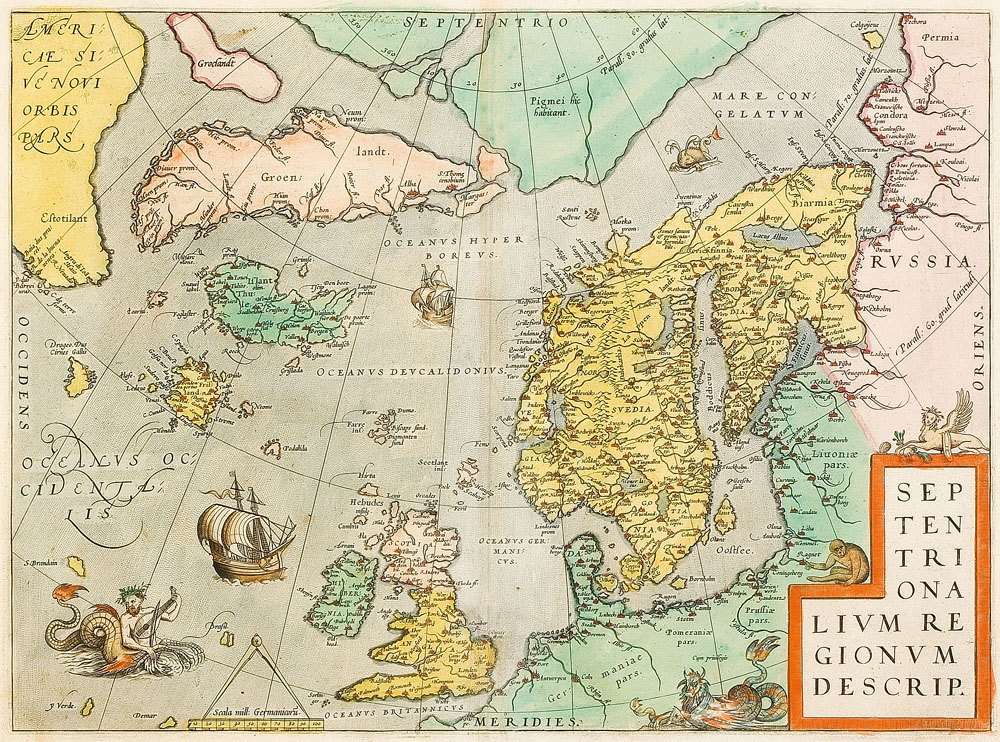
Map of the northern region (including some fantasy islands) by Abraham Ortelius, c. 1570.

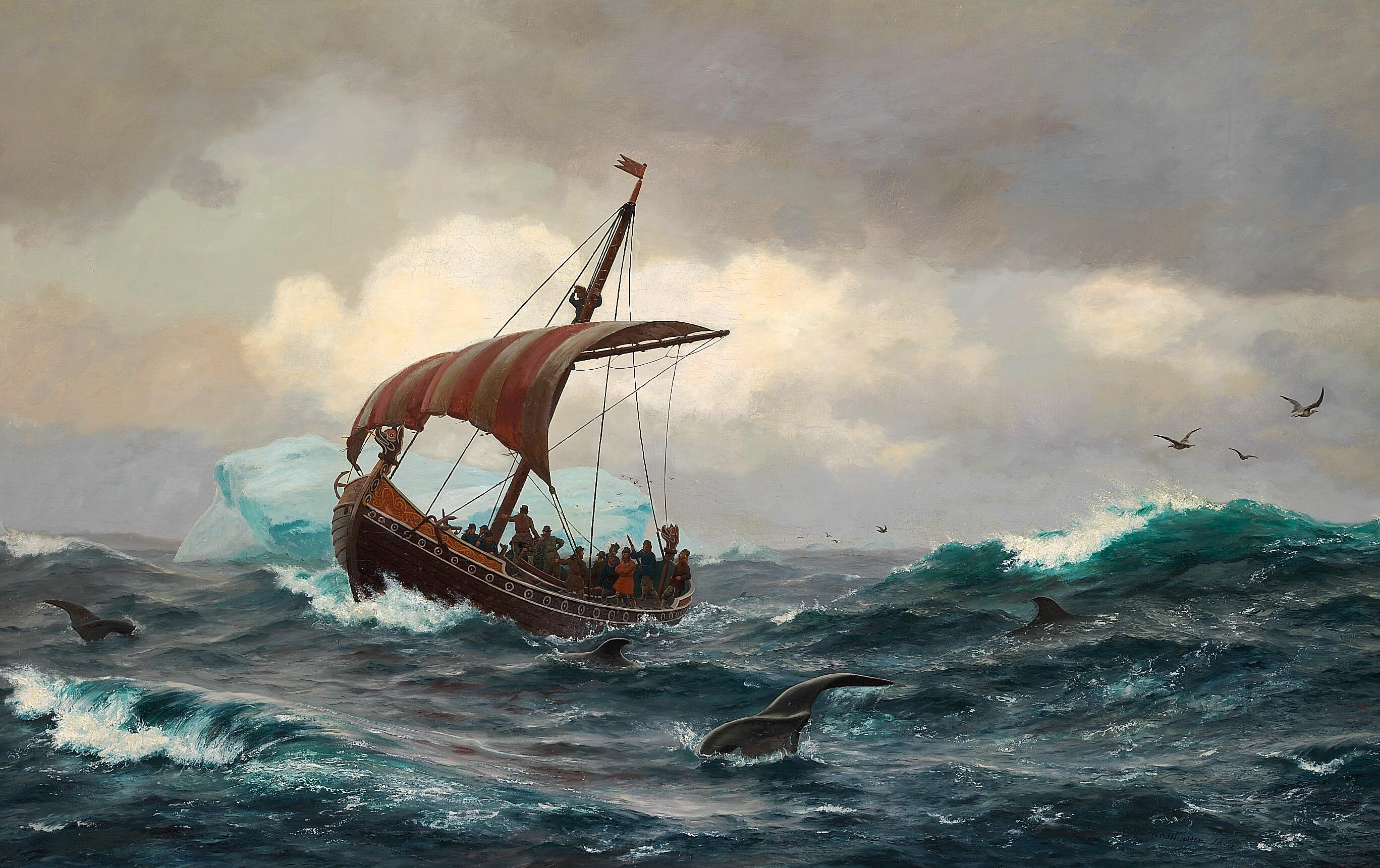
Summer in the Greenland coast circa the year 1000 by Carl Rasmussen (1874).

It has been a common mistake for popular history to occasionally credit Erik as being the first European to discover Greenland, however, the Icelandic sagas suggest that earlier Norsemen discovered and attempted to settle it before him. Tradition credits Gunnbjörn Ulfsson (also known as Gunnbjörn Ulf-Krakuson) with the first sighting of the land-mass. Nearly a century before Erik, strong winds had driven Gunnbjörn towards a set of islands between Iceland and Greenland, later named Gunnbjörn's skerries in his honor. However, the accidental nature of Gunnbjörn's discovery has led to his neglect in the history of Greenland. After Gunnbjörn, roughly eighty years later the outlaw Snæbjörn galti had also visited Greenland and attempted to settle there. According to a saga that has now been lost to time, Galti headed the first Norse attempt to colonize Greenland, which ended in failure for Galti and his party due to the many unforgiving hardships that they faced during the winter on the island. As a result of Galti's failed expedition, Erik the Red is widely credited to be the first known, and successful, permanent settler of Greenland.

=== Greenland ===
During his exile, around 982, Erik sailed to a somewhat mysterious and little-known land that Snæbjörn galti Hólmsteinsson had unsuccessfully attempted to settle a few years before. Erik rounded the southern tip of the island, later known as Cape Farewell, and sailed up the western coast. Eventually, Erik reached a part of the coast that, for the most part, seemed ice-free and consequently had conditions—similar to those of Iceland—that promised growth and future prosperity. According to the Saga of Erik the Red, Erik spent his three years of exile exploring this land. The first winter Erik spent on the island of Eiriksey, the second winter he passed in Eiriksholmar (close to Hvarfsgnipa). In the final summer Erik explored as far north as Snaefell and into Hrafnsfjord.

When Erik returned to Iceland after his exile had expired, he is said to have brought with him stories of "Greenland". Erik purposefully gave the land a more appealing name than "Iceland" as "people would be attracted to go there if it had a favorable name", per Erik's own words. Erik knew that the success of any settlement in Greenland would need the support of as many people as possible.

Erik's salesmanship of Greenland proved successful as after spending the winter in Iceland, Erik returned to Greenland in the summer of 985 with a large number of colonists. However, out of 25 ships that left for Greenland, only 14 arrived, some of the other 11 having turned back, but others likely lost. The Icelanders established two colonies on the southwest coast: the Eastern Settlement or Eystribyggð, in what is now Qaqortoq, and the Western Settlement, close to present-day Nuuk. Eventually, a Middle Settlement grew, but many suggest it formed part of the Eastern Settlement. The Eastern and Western Settlements, both established on the southwest coast, proved the only two areas suitable for farming. During the summers, when the weather was more favorable to travel, each settlement would send an army of men to hunt in Disko Bay above the Arctic Circle for food and other valuable commodities such as seals (used for rope), ivory from walrus tusks, and beached whales.

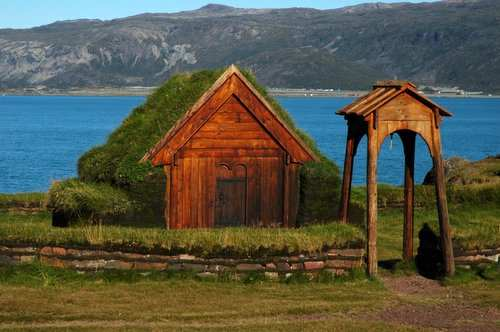
21st-century reproduction of Þjódhild's church, with Eriksfjord in the background. Located in Qassiarsuk, Greenland.

==== Eastern Settlement ====
In the Eastern Settlement, Erik built the estate of Brattahlíð, near present-day Narsarsuaq, in what is known today as Qassiarsuk. Erik held the title of paramount chieftain of Greenland and became both greatly respected and wealthy.

The settlement flourished, growing to 5,000 inhabitants spread over a considerable area along Eriksfjord and neighboring fjords. Groups of immigrants escaping overcrowding in Iceland joined the original party. However, one group of immigrants which arrived in 1002 brought with it an epidemic that ravaged the colony, killing many of its leading citizens, including Erik himself. Nevertheless, the colony rebounded and survived until the Little Ice Age made the land marginal for European life-styles in the 15th century, shortly before Christopher Columbus's first voyage to the Americas in 1492. Pirate raids, conflict with Inuit moving into the Norse territories, and the colony's abandonment by Norway became other factors in its decline.

== Comparisons to Greenland saga ==
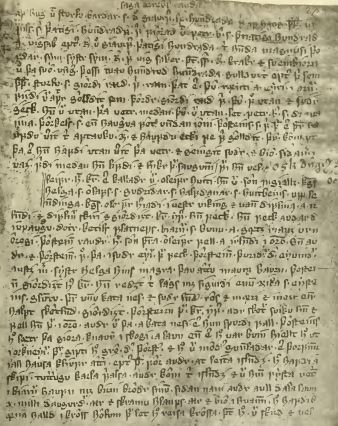
First page of the Saga of Erik the Red, written by an Icelandic Cleric, 13th century.

Numerous parallels exist between the Saga of Erik the Red and the Greenland saga, including recurring characters and recountings of the same expeditions, though with a few notable differences. The saga of Erik the Red portrays a number of the expeditions in the Greenland saga as just one expedition led by Thorfinn Karlsefni, although Erik's son Thorvald, his daughter Freydís and Karlsefni's wife Gudrid play key roles in the retelling. Another notable difference is the location of their settlements. According to the Grœnlendinga saga, Karlsefni and the others settled in a place that is referred to only as Vinland, while in Erik the Red's saga they formed two base settlements: Straumfjǫrðr where they spent the winter and the following spring, and Hop where they later settled but ran into problems with the natives they called Skrælings, as depicted in the Greenland saga. The two accounts are largely similar otherwise, both with heavy emphasis on the exploits of Thorfinn Karlsefni and his wife Gudrid.
