= Paramount chieftain =

Ancient Norse rulers of Greenland

The rulers of the ancient Norse settlements in Greenland were called paramount chieftains. The first chieftain was Erik the Red, the founder of these settlements. The seat of the chieftainship was Brattahlid, his family estate.

Norse settlement of Greenland, and along with it the system of paramount chieftainship, began with Erik the Red in 985 or 986. The settlements were abandoned around the 1400s, after declining throughout the 1300s, for disputed reasons.

The first three of the island nation's chieftains were:

- Erik the Red, or Erik Thorvaldsson, the nation's first chieftain and its first settler, began rule in 985 or 986.
- Leif Ericson, son of Erik the Red, beginning about 1000, after his father's death.
- Thorkell Leifsson succeeded his father, Leif, by 1025.

It is unknown whether Leiffson's descendants continued to be the paramount chiefs of Greenland, although it is known that the seat of the paramount chieftainship continued to be at Brattahlid.
