= Helgi and Finnbogi =

Icelandic merchant brothers

Helgi and Finnbogi (Old Norse: [ˈhelɡe], [ˈfinːˌboɣe]; Modern Icelandic: [ˈhɛlcɪ], [ˈfɪnːˌpɔijɪ]) were two merchant brothers from Iceland, born in the late 10th century AD.

== Biography ==
The Saga of the Greenlanders describes them as coming to Greenland one summer. According to Gísli Sigurðsson’s analysis of the saga tradition, Helgi and Finnbogi are unlikely to have been historical people: they are otherwise unknown from surviving sources, and their appearance in the Saga of the Greenlanders may derive from the saga author's invention.. There they negotiated a deal with Freydis Eiriksdottir, agreeing to share the profits of a voyage to newly discovered Vinland. Each agreed to take 30 crewmembers, but Freydis secretly took more.

In Vinland, there was tension between the two groups. Helgi and Finnbogi set up a settlement separate from Freydis and her crew. Freydis eventually went to the brothers' hut and asked how they were faring. "Well," responded the brothers, "but we do not like this ill-feeling that has sprung up between us." The two sides made peace.

Freydis, once outside, beat herself so that it would appear as if she had been ill-treated. When she returned to her husband, he asked who had beaten her. Freydis claimed Helgi and Finnbogi were the culprits, and, calling him a coward, demanded that he exact revenge on her behalf, or else she would divorce him. He gathered his men and killed Helgi and Finnbogi, as well as the men in their camp. When he refused to kill the women, Freydis herself picked up an axe and massacred them. When she returned to Greenland, she told her brother Leif Eiriksson that Helgi and Finnbogi had decided to stay in Vinland.
