= Freydís Eiríksdóttir =

10th century Icelandic explorer and colonist

Freydís Eiríksdóttir (born c. 965) was an Icelandic woman said to be the daughter of Erik the Red (as in her patronym), who figured prominently in the Norse exploration of North America as an early colonist of Vinland, while her brother, Leif Erikson, is credited in early histories of the region with the first European contact. The medieval and primary sources that mention Freydís are the two Vinland sagas: the Saga of the Greenlanders and the Saga of Erik the Red. The two sagas offer differing accounts, though Freydís is portrayed in both as one of the strongest female Vikings.

== Saga of the Greenlanders ==
The Saga of the Greenlanders is an account of the Norse experiences in Vinland (present day Newfoundland and Labrador). Freydís' experiences in Vinland are relayed in Chapter 8 of this saga, which describes her as Leif Erikson's full sister. This is the most famous extant account of Freydís.

After the success of expeditions to Vinland led by Leif Erikson, Þorvaldr Eiríksson, and Þorfinnr Karlsefni, Freydís wanted the prestige and wealth associated with a Vinland journey. She made a deal with two Icelandic men, Helgi and Finnbogi, that they should go together to Vinland and share all profits half-and-half. Freydís asked her brother Leif Erikson for permission to use the homes and stables that he had built in Vinland. He agreed that they all could use the houses. Helgi and Finnbogi agreed that they would bring the same number of men and supplies as Freydis, but Freydís smuggled more men into her ship. Helgi and Finnbogi, arriving early, took refuge in the houses; when Freydís arrived, she ordered the brothers to move, as the houses were her brother's and meant for her. This was the first of many disagreements between Freydís and the brothers.

In Vinland, there was tension between the two groups. Helgi and Finnbogi set up a settlement separate from Freydis and her crew. Freydis eventually went to the brothers' hut and asked how they were faring. "Well," responded the brothers; "but we do not like this ill-feeling that has sprung up between us." The two sides made peace.

When she returned to her husband, Freydís claimed that Helgi and Finnbogi had beaten her, and, calling him a coward, demanded that he exact revenge on her behalf, or else she would divorce him. He gathered his men and killed Helgi and Finnbogi as well as the men in their camp when they were sleeping. When they refused to kill the five women in the camp, Freydís herself picked up an axe and massacred them.

Freydís, to conceal her treachery, threatened death to anyone who told of the killings. She went back to Greenland after a year's stay and told her brother Leif Eiriksson that Helgi and Finnbogi had decided to stay in Vinland. However, word of the killings eventually reached Leif. He had three men from Freydís's expedition tortured until they confessed the whole occurrence. Thinking ill of the deeds, Leif still did not want "to do that to Freydís, my sister, which she has deserved." However, he remarked that he foresaw Freydís' descendants having little prosperity. The saga concludes that everyone thought ill of her descendants afterwards.

== Saga of Erik the Red ==
The Saga of Erik the Red was written after The Saga of the Greenlanders. This saga portrays Freydís as a notable and strong woman, the half-sister to Leif Erikson. She joined an expedition to Vinland led by Þorfinnr Karlsefni, but is only mentioned once in the saga when the expedition was attacked by natives (also known as the Skrælingjar in Icelandic). The natives, equipped with "war-slings, or catapults", stealthily attacked the expedition's camp at night and shot at the warriors.

Many of the Norsemen panicked, having never seen such weaponry. As men fled during the confusion, Freydís, who was eight months pregnant, admonished them, saying: "Why run you away from such worthless creatures, stout men that ye are, when, as seems to me likely, you might slaughter them like so many cattle? Let me but have a weapon, I know I could fight better than any of you."

Ignored, Freydís picked up the sword of the fallen Thorbrand Snorrisson and engaged the attacking natives. Surrounded by enemies, she undid her garment and beat the sword upon her breast. At this the natives retreated to their boats and fled. Þorfinnr and the other survivors praised her zeal.

== In popular culture ==
Freydís features as a main character in many modern novels including Ewald Gerhard Seeliger's Freydis Rothaar (1919), Elizabeth Boyer's Freydis and Gudrid (1976), William Vollmann's The Ice-Shirt (1990), Joan Clark's Eriksdottir: A Tale of Dreams and Luck (2002), Jackie French's They Came on Viking Ships (2005), Amalia Carosella's Daughter of a Thousand Years (2017), Laurent Binet's Civilizations (2019), Max Davine's Spirits of the Ice Forest (2021), Tamara Goranson's The Voyage of Freydis (2021), and numerous others.

On television, Katia Winter portrayed Freydís in season 3 (2016–17) of the superhero TV series DC's Legends of Tomorrow episodes "Beebo the God of War" and "The Good, the Bad, and the Cuddly". Frida Gustavsson portrayed Freydís in the 2022 Netflix series Vikings: Valhalla.

A limited-mintage two-ounce silver coin was issued for the South Pacific island country of Niue and was announced in May 2021, depicting Freydis storming ashore from a longship.
