= Gunnbjörn Ulfsson =

10th-century Norse explorer

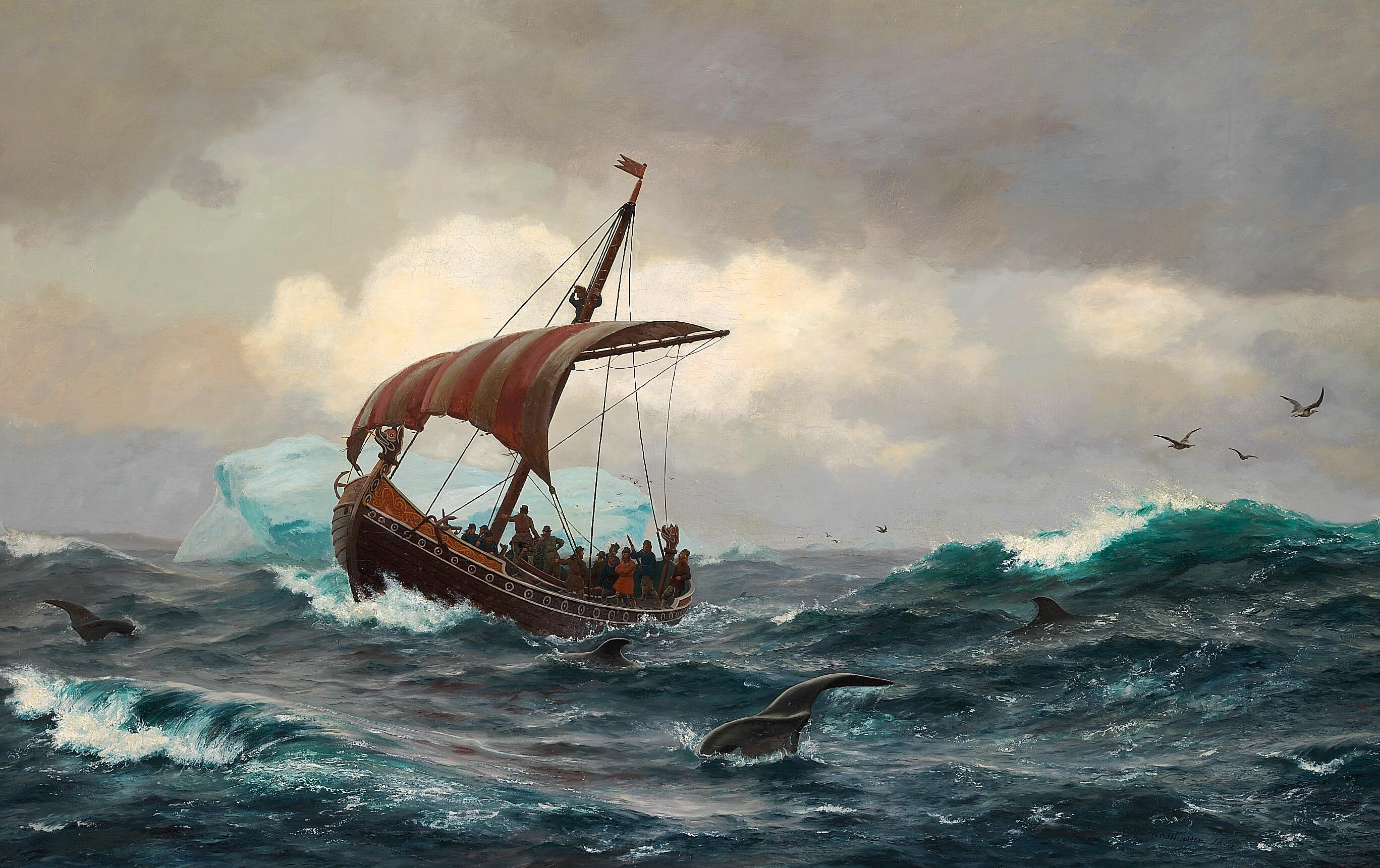
Summer in the Greenland coast c.1000 by Carl Rasmussen

Gunnbjörn Ulfsson (fl. c. 10th century), also called Gunnbjörn Ulf-Krakuson, was a Norse explorer, originally from Norway and later a settler of Iceland. He is credited with being the first European to sight Greenland when he was blown off course during a voyage from Norway to Iceland. Several modern place names in Greenland commemorate him, most notably Gunnbjørn Fjeld, the island’s highest mountain.

== Sources ==
Gunnbjörn is mentioned in the short narratives of the Book of Settlement of Iceland (Landnámabók) and Saga of Erik the Red, which tell of Eirik's plans to explore lands west of Iceland: "... he intended to search for the land that Gunnbjörn son of Úlf the Crow saw when he sailed west around Iceland, when he found Gunnbjarnarsker; ..." In the Greenland Chronicle of Björn Jónsson á Skarðsá it is stated: "The reason why Eric the Red sailed to Greenland is none other than that in the memory of the old men it was said that Gunnbjörn, son of Úlfr Kráka, thought he had seen a glacier in the sea to the west, at the same time as Snæfellsjökull when he drifted west into the sea after he left the Gunnbjarnaeyjar Islands."

Landnámabók records that Gunnbjörn's sons lived in Iceland’s Westfjords and notes that the Gunnbjörnssker were named after him. Blown off course while sailing from Norway, Gunnbjörn and his crew sighted islands west of Iceland (later called Gunnbjörn's skerries). They reported the discovery but did not land. An exact date for this event is not preserved in the sagas; sources suggest dates ranging from about 876 to 932. The first recorded visits to the skerries were made by the Icelandic explorer Snæbjörn Galti around 978, and soon after by Erik the Red, who explored Greenland during his three-year exile from Iceland, and later established a settlement there.

Waldemar Lehn (1911–2005), professor emeritus at the University of Manitoba and an expert on atmospheric refraction and mirages, argued that the skerries Gunnbjörn reported may have been a superior mirage of Greenland’s coast rather than actual islands. Such phenomena were known to the Norse, who called them hillingar. If this interpretation is correct, Gunnbjörn’s voyage would represent the first recorded European sighting of North America.
