= Snæbjörn galti =

Icelandic explorer

Snæbjörn galti Hólmsteinsson (Modern Icelandic: [ˈstnaiːˌpjœ(r)tn̥ ˈkal̥tɪ ˈhoulmˌsteinsˌsɔːn]; Old Norse: Snæbjǫrn galti Hólmsteinsson [ˈsnɛːˌbjɔrn ˈɡɑlte ˈhoːlmˌstɛinsˌson]; c. 910 – c. 978) was an Icelandic Norse explorer who was the first person recorded to intentionally lead an expedition to Greenland, probably in 981 or 982 CE. His voyage followed the sighting of the Gunnbjörn Skerries just off the coast of Greenland by Gunnbjörn Ulfsson c. 900. The story was told in the Saga of Snæbjörn Galti, now lost. According to Landnámabók, Snæbjörn led an attempt to establish a settlement on the eastern coast of Greenland, doing so before Erik the Red. The attempt ended with failure: internal strife broke out among the settlers and Snæbjörn was killed, reportedly by Rolf Rødsander and his boon companion Styrbjorn. They fled toward eastern Greenland to the offshore Skerries, apparently the small islands beneath Mont Forel, which stands 3,300 meters (10,800 ft) high. These islets lie just offshore from modern-day Angmagssalik, one of the more habitable locations in East Greenland. Here they were locked in by bad weather, so they built a stone hut and waited out the winter until spring. The entire surviving group then sailed to Hålogaland in northern Norway, and eventually returned to Iceland, where Rødsander and Styrbjorn were killed themselves to avenge the killing of Snæbjörn and Thorodd.

Erik the Red later became the known successful Norse settler of Greenland in the 980s, after spending three years exploring the west coast of Greenland during his exile from Iceland, as described in the Saga of Erik the Red.
