= Gunnbjörn's skerries =

Group of islands between Iceland and Greenland

Gunnbjörn's skerries (Gunnbjarnarsker) were a group of small rocky islands along or near the eastern coast of Greenland. They form the earliest mention of Greenland in the Sagas of Icelanders. In the early 10th century, Gunnbjörn Ulfsson reports finding a group of rocky islands in the Atlantic when his ship is blown off course from Iceland. Named after him, Gunnbjörn's skerries were likely near modern-day Kulusuk just off the eastern coast of Greenland, but their exact location is unknown. According to the Landnámabók, Snæbjörn Galti led the earliest recorded intentional Norse voyage to Greenland and started a failed settlement on the eastern coast of Greenland at the skerries. The colony struggled, Snæbjörn Galti was murdered, the settlement was abandoned, and only 2 colonists survived the return to Iceland. Ívar Bárðarson, a Catholic priest sent to Greenland in 1341, wrote that the skerries were about "two days and two nights sailing due West" from Iceland and the halfway point on trips to the later more successful colonies on the western coast. After the end of the Medieval Warm Period, the area began to freeze over and became hazardous to ships. Some later medieval cartographers claim the entire area was "destroyed" by volcanic activity.
