= Vinland Saga (TV series) =

Japanese anime television series

- ヴィンランド・サガ; Vinrando Saga
- Type: TV series
- Genre: Adventure; Epic; Historical
- Based on: Vinland Saga
- Created by: Makoto Yukimura
- Directed by: Shūhei Yabuta
- Series composition: Hiroshi Seko
- Screenplay by: Hiroshi Seko; Kenta Ihara (5–24)
- Character designer: Takahiko Abiru
- Music by: Yutaka Yamada
- Voices of: Yūto Uemura; Kensho Ono; Naoya Uchida; Akio Otsuka; Shunsuke Takeuchi
- No. of seasons: 2
- No. of episodes: 48 (list of episodes)

Production
- Art directors: Yūsuke Takeda; Izumi Hirabayashi (11, 13–24); Kentarō Ōnuki (11, 13–24)
- Sound director: Shōji Hata
- Cinematographers: Yūki Kawashita; Hisashi Matsumuko (S2)
- Color designers: Satoshi Hashimoto; Minori Nishida (S2)
- CG directors: Mayu Takebana (S1); Kōhei Ogawa (S2)
- Editor: Kashiko Kimura
- Animation producer: Hiroya Hasegawa
- Studios: Wit Studio (S1); MAPPA (S2)
- Producers: Naokado Fujiyama; Yōko Ueda (S1); Mitsuhiro Sugita (S1); Hitoshi Matsumoto (S2); Masae Yamato (S2); Akira Yonezawa (S2)
- Production companies: Vinland Saga Production Committee: Twin Engine; Kodansha; Dentsu (13–48); Production I.G (S1); Wit Studio (S1)
- Runtime: 24 minutes

Original release
- Networks: NHK General TV (S1); Tokyo MX, BS11, GBS, AT-X (S2)
- Release: July 8, 2019 – June 20, 2023

Vinland Saga (Japanese: ヴィンランド・サガ, Hepburn: Vinrando Saga) is a Japanese anime television series based on Makoto Yukimura's manga series Vinland Saga. The first season of the series was produced by Wit Studio and aired in 2019; the second season was produced by MAPPA and aired in 2023. The story follows the life of Thorfinn, who becomes involved with Vikings and war following his father's death at the hands of Askeladd. The first season follows the Jomsvikings and Vikings mercenaries in a conflict to find a new king for the Danes, while the second season focuses on a group of slaves living on a farm.

Despite the two seasons being produced by different studios, director Shūhei Yabuta and writer Hiroshi Seko worked together on both. They aimed to bring more original content to the adaptation in order to further develop the characters, like Thorfinn's transformation into a Viking, the nightmares that haunt him, and Einar's life before becoming a slave. The series has been made available for streaming worldwide on Amazon Prime and Netflix.

The first season of the anime has received critical acclaim for its animation, direction, writing, cinematography, action sequences, voice acting, and themes; particularly the handling of the Vikings' violence. The second season received similar responses for its themes of slavery and pacifism, as well as its focus on Thorfinn's psychology.

== Voice cast ==
Character	Japanese voice	English voice (Sentai Filmworks / Crunchyroll dub)	English voice (Netflix dub)
Thorfinn	Yūto Uemura; Shizuka Ishigami (childhood)	Mike Haimoto; Shannon Emerick (childhood)	Aleks Le; Laura Stahl (childhood)
Canute	Kensho Ono	Jessie James Grelle	Griffin Burns
Askeladd	Naoya Uchida	David Wald	Kirk Thornton
Thorkell	Akio Otsuka	Joe Daniels	Patrick Seitz
Einar	Shunsuke Takeuchi	Ian Sinclair	Alejandro Saab

== Series overview ==
Season	Episodes	Originally released	
Season	Episodes	First released	Last released
1	24	July 8, 2019	December 30, 2019
2	24	January 10, 2023	June 20, 2023

=== Season 1 (2019) ===
Thorfinn is a young Iceland villager who aims to participate in wars like his retired father, Thors. He sneaks onto his father's ship while at the same time mercenaries are hired to kill Thors for abandoning the forces. They are attacked by Askeladd's forces and, to prevent the deaths of his son and his men, Thors surrenders and is killed. Enraged, Thorfinn starts training and working as a mercenary for the Vikings for several jobs during his growth as a teenager in order to get his proper revenge on Askeladd.

=== Season 2 (2023) ===
Einar is a farmer whose family is killed by Vikings. He is taken and bought as a slave in southern Denmark by a man named Ketil. Upon his arrival, Einar meets another slave, Thorfinn, who was exiled after the events of the first season. As time passes, Einar learns of Thorfinn's crimes but befriends him as they work together to earn their freedom. Thorfinn confronts his past, learns about the value of restraint and the cost of violence, shaping his decisions and interactions.

== Production ==
=== Season 1 ===
Shūhei Yabuta had been working as 3D CGI animator with Wit Studio CEO Tetsuya Nakatake on several projects, including the anime series Attack on Titan and Kabaneri of the Iron Fortress. He was gradually given more responsibilities involving directing and scriptwriting from 2012. Yabuta was a fan of the Vinland Saga manga and his ideas for an anime series resonated with the producer, and he was given the opportunity to direct the series. He researched the Vikings but believed the biggest appeal of the series was in the handling of the characters. He found the artwork of the manga very detailed which was difficult to animate, and noted that designer Takahiko Abiru was put through some challenges to replicate it. Art director Yūsuke Takeda was requested by Yabuta to give both backgrounds and designs strong presences. Yabuta found the Viking ships challenging to model in 3D CGI animation.

From the first chapter, Seko was impressed by the manga author Makoto Yukimura's storytelling to the point of considering it one of his three favorite manga. Nevertheless, Seko mentioned the anime would have its own take on the story. While the anime begins chronologically while the manga uses flashbacks, so Thorfinn's growth develops from different perspectives. Yabuta wanted to focus more on Thorfinn's upbringing in Iceland rather than using the Vikings to show his origins. With the need of animating several fight scenes, the team used 3D CG with the action and camerawork as a set. In retrospect, Yabuta found the fight scenes were difficult to animate due to multiple storyboards. When the anime finale aired in Japan, Yabuta wrote, "This big incident changed everything for Thorfinn, but his story will continue!".

=== Season 2 ===
Yabuta and Seko had a strong impression of the character of Einar when first reading the manga but did not understand where the character's strength originated. Upon discussing, they decided to change the way in which Einar becomes Thorfinn's friend. This required several hours for the team to redevelop the story but they felt it would add appeal to the second season. Despite the changes, Yabuta insisted that Einar was the same character from the manga. The director described Einar as soft spoken, kind and strong but even in the cruel setting of the series, he retains his kindness. Yabuta consulted with Yukimura about Einar's portrayal with a superhuman strength in befriending Thorfinn. The anime's second season added more content about Thorfinn's sins through nightmares alternating the violence of his past persona with the shocked reaction of his slave persona; this was praised by Yukimura for the understanding of Thorfinn's state of mind.

The developers had a need to properly animate Thorfinn's facial expressions as a slave. The setting was animated based on Yabuta's input. Producer Naokado Fujiyama said the main theme involves the handling of psychology, most notably in Thorfinn, Einar and Ketil. In contrast to Thorfinn and Einar who become friendlier and active across the story, Ketil displays a darker tone in the last episodes of the season due to the violent themes

== Release ==
The series was announced in March 2018. Produced by Twin Engine, Production I.G, Wit Studio and Kodansha, the series was animated by Wit Studio and directed by Shūhei Yabuta, with Hiroshi Seko handling series composition, Takahiko Abiru designing the characters, and Yutaka Yamada composing the music. The series ran for 24 episodes on NHK General TV, premiering July 8, 2019, with the first three episodes, and concluding on December 30 of that same year. (Note: NHK listed the series premiere on July 7 at 24:10 which is effectively July 8 at 12:10 a.m. JST.)

Amazon streamed the series worldwide on its Prime Video service. Sentai Filmworks released the series on home video on August 31, 2021, with both a new translation and English dub. A different English dub, produced by VSI Los Angeles, previously launched on Netflix in Japan. MVM Entertainment licensed the series in the United Kingdom and Ireland. It began streaming on Netflix globally on July 7, 2022, as well as Crunchyroll and Hidive in select territories on the same day.

In July 2021, Twin Engine announced that a second season was in production. Shūhei Yabuta returned as director, and Takahiko Abiru returned as character designer. The second season was animated by MAPPA, and premiered on Tokyo MX, BS11, and GBS on January 10, 2023, (Note: Tokyo MX listed the series premiere on January 9 at 24:30 which is effectively January 10 at 12:30 a.m. JST.) running for 24 episodes. The second season was simulcast globally on both Netflix, and Crunchyroll, excluding China, South Korea and Japan.

== Music ==
The soundtrack of the series was composed by Yutaka Yamada while the sound effects director was Shoji Hata. Inspired by the manga, Yamada wanted the music to represent the psychological states of Thorfinn and other characters. Yabuta and Hata often had discussions in regards to what kind of music they should use. In testing, Yamada provided Yabuta with a demo of 26 songs, made to represent and amplify the emotion a character was displaying. While Hata helped Yamada in the first season, for the second season he worked alone. This led to the next season having more piano tracks. The original soundtrack album contains 43 tracks and was released on February 19, 2020. The second original soundtrack album contains 20 tracks and was released on July 14, 2023.

The first opening theme of the TV series "Mukanjyo" by Survive Said the Prophet, while the first ending theme is "Torches" by Aimer. The former band said they found the theme comfortable to play. Meanwhile, Aimer wanted to portray the emotions Thorfinn and Thors share in the early episodes as the song foreshadows the latter's death. The second opening theme is "Dark Crow" by Man with a Mission, and the second ending theme is "Drown" by Milet. The seconds opening follows the Viking theme while Milet's "Drown" instead focuses on Thorfinn's mind as it primarily focus on his violence.

For the second season, the first opening theme is "River" by Anonymouz, while the first ending theme is "Without Love" by LMYK. Anonymouz wanted to portray through her songs the weakened Thorfinn and what new emotions the protagonist could obtain as a slave. LMYK expressed similar desires but in a more tragic nature as the song is meant to show the hopelessness and regrets the character suffered. The second opening theme is "Paradox" by Survive Said the Prophet, and the second ending theme is "Ember" by haju:harmonics. Yosh was inspired to write more stylish lyrics with far more hopes. haju:harmonics, meanwhile, wanted to portray courage and hope with her song.

== Reception ==
=== Critical response ===
The anime Vinland Saga was received with critical acclaim with several websites like IGN, Kadokawa Game Linkage. and Anime News Network listing it as one of the best ones released upon their release. "Mukanjyo" was also listed as one of the best songs of 2019 by Anime News Network (ANN) for both the music and the lyrics, which focus on Thorfinn's revenge quest and its failure. In regards to the first season, Polygon commended the character development shown in its first three episodes and ultimately enjoyed its portrayal of violence. Otaku USA called Vinland Saga enjoyed the handling of the revenger's narrative and named it one of the best anime series of 2019 due to its focus of characters and setting. On a more negative side, Decider found Thorfinn's quest sad but considered that it still makes the series entertaining to watch, comparing the violent and fight sequences to other series like Berserk or Bastard!!. Nevertheless, he noted that the violence might turn down some viewers. Nick Creamer from ANN placed it among the year's best anime and praised the themes, action scenes and characters. While the protagonist Thorfinn was praised for his action sequences, he was still criticized for his lack of development. Den of Geek found Askeladd to be "just as often the victim as he is the villain", with his humanity shown in interactions with Thorfinn and Canute. Hajime Isayama, the creator of Attack on Titan, was surprised by Askeladd's death, most specifically by how Wit Studio animated it in the season finale. The Fandom Post found the relationship between Thorkell and Thorfinn interesting but lamented how the latter is not changed by the fact that both know Thors or are related by blood.

The second season's premiere earned praise by several writers from ANN for focusing on the violence in Einar's backstory, fitting in with the elements of violence from the first season. According to The Escapist, Einar adds to the thematic cycle of violence and revenge the series portrays. After interacting with more people, Thorfinn makes the series depart of the theme and removing violence. Both ANN and The Fandom Post praised the episode where Thorfinn realizes mistakes of his life as a Viking and makes an oath of pacifism. The Daily Star agreed and found that Thorfinn's mundane life as a slave brings intriguing stories about "redemption and self-discovery". The climax was praised for the handling of Thorfinn and Canute. Polygon compared Thorfinn's pacifism with anime characters Shigeo Kageyama and Naruto Uzumaki as they look for more peaceful resolution. The website particularly felt Thorfinn's resolution in the declaration "I have no enemies" as the biggest highlight of the anime. As a result of Thorfinn's changes, Anime News Network listed him as the best character from 2023. In another article, ANN listed the scene where Thorfinn confronts Canute's soldiers as the best from 2023 thanks to the warrior philosophy. THEM Anime Reviews gave the second season a perfect score thanks to the handling of multiple characters at the same as they are explored in the farm with major focus on Thorfinn's parallel with Canute due to how they changed after the first season. ANN praised the plot and Japanese voice cast but criticized the English dub's choice to cast Mike Haimoto as Thorfinn again in the second season, referencing a controversy linked to the actor, maintaining that Yūto Uemura's original performance was still the best fit for the protagonist.

=== Awards and nominations ===
Year	Award	Category	Recipient	Result	Ref.
2019	IGN Awards	Best Anime Series	Vinland Saga	Nominated	
2019	IGN Awards	Best Animation	Vinland Saga	Nominated	
2020	6th Anime Trending Awards	Anime of the Year	Vinland Saga	Won	
2020	6th Anime Trending Awards	Best in Sceneries and Visuals	Vinland Saga	Won	
2020	6th Anime Trending Awards	Best Action & Adventure Anime	Vinland Saga	Won	
2020	4th Crunchyroll Anime Awards	Anime of the Year	Vinland Saga	Nominated	
2020	4th Crunchyroll Anime Awards	Best Antagonist	Askeladd	Nominated	
2020	4th Crunchyroll Anime Awards	Best Animation	Vinland Saga	Nominated	
2020	4th Crunchyroll Anime Awards	Best Director	Shuhei Yabuta	Nominated	
2020	4th Crunchyroll Anime Awards	Best Character Design	Takahiko Abiru	Nominated	
2020	4th Crunchyroll Anime Awards	Best Drama	Vinland Saga	Won	
2020	4th Crunchyroll Anime Awards	Best Opening Sequence	"Mukanjyo" by Survive Said The Prophet	Nominated	
2020	4th Crunchyroll Anime Awards	Best Ending Sequence	"Torches" by Aimer	Nominated	
2020	4th Crunchyroll Anime Awards	Best Fight Scene	Thorfinn vs. Thorkell	Nominated	
2023	7th Crunchyroll Anime Awards	Best Voice Artist Performance (German)	Torsten Michaelis as Askeladd	Nominated	
2023	IGN Awards	Best Anime Series	Vinland Saga Season 2	Won	
2024	8th Crunchyroll Anime Awards	Anime of the Year	Vinland Saga Season 2	Nominated	
2024	8th Crunchyroll Anime Awards	Best Main Character	Thorfinn	Nominated	
2024	8th Crunchyroll Anime Awards	Best Drama	Vinland Saga Season 2	Nominated	
2024	8th Crunchyroll Anime Awards	Best Continuing Series	Vinland Saga Season 2	Nominated	
2024	8th Crunchyroll Anime Awards	Best Cinematography	Hisashi Matsumuko and Yuki Kawashita	Nominated	
2024	Japan Expo Awards	Daruma for Best Opening	"Paradox" by Survive Said the Prophet	Nominated	
2025	9th Crunchyroll Anime Awards	Best Voice Artist Performance (Hindi)	Abhishek Sharma as Einar	Nominated	
