= Thorkell (Vinland Saga) =

Fictional character from Vinland Saga

- Vinland Saga character
- Thorkell, as drawn by Makoto Yukimura
- First appearance: Vinland Saga chapter 18
- Created by: Makoto Yukimura
- Portrayed by: Takeshi Hayashino (stage play)
- Voiced by: Japanese Akio Otsuka; English Joe Daniels (Sentai Filmworks dub) Patrick Seitz (Netflix dub)

Thorkell (Japanese: トルケル, Hepburn: Torukeru), also known as "Thorkell the Tall" and "Thorkell the Invincible", is a fictional character from Makoto Yukimura's manga Vinland Saga. Thorkell is introduced as a commander from the Jomsviking, Viking mercenaries or conquerors allied with the King. He switches sides to fight for the English before choosing to ally himself with Prince Canute. He opposes the Vikings with whom the lead character, Thorfinn, works, but instead becomes interested in the protagonist for being the son of the warrior Thors, who is married to his brother's daughter. He is once again prominent in the series' third story arc, where he joins forces with the older Thorfinn as there are plans to make a revolution within the Jomsviking.

Thorkell was created as a contrast to the other fighters appearing in the manga, who were serious personality-wise. As a result, Yukimura enjoyed writing Thorkell because it made his acts of violence easier to draw. He is meant to represent the Vikings in general due to his love for violence and childish personality, which Yukimura carefully wrote to appeal to young readers. In the anime adaptation, Thorkell is voiced by Akio Otsuka in Japanese, Joe Daniels in the English dub by Sentai Filmworks, and Patrick Seitz in the Netflix dub.

Critical response to his character was positive for how comical he is as well as his large design. His fights in the anime were also praised for the choreography presented, especially when he faces Thorfinn, to the point of being nominated as one of the best fighters of the year by Crunchyroll.

== Creation ==
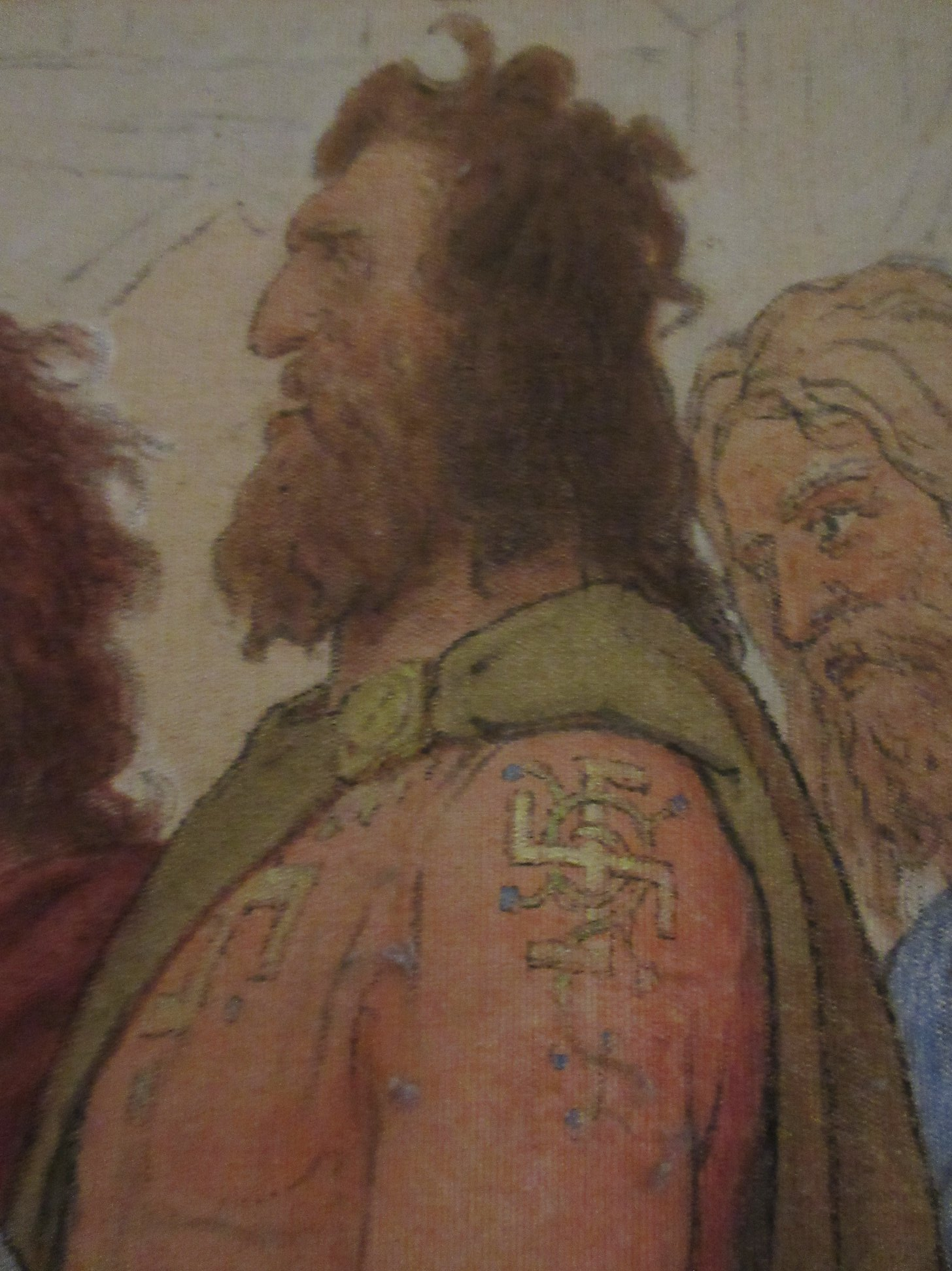
Thorkell the Tall painted by the Danish artist Lorenz Frølich in the 1880s.

The character of Thorkell is modeled after Thorkell the Tall, a man known for his bravery and build. Manga author Makoto Yukimura imagines that there were men like these "monsters" everywhere during the Viking era, both famous and unknown. His design also evokes the feeling of a villain from young readers' manga who relies on a single type of skill and can be easily defeated. However, Yukimura wanted Thorkell to be more unique and give Thorkell the feeling of having a lot of strength. Yukimura specifically created Thorkell as a representation of what the Vikings stood for. When it comes to his personality, despite being introduced as a grandfather, he acts like a child in all of his appearances. Nevertheless, Yukimura avoids making him look uncool or stupid, as he believes the younger demographic would enjoy Thorkell, as the author notes that the young readers are also prone to violence like the character. In retrospect, Yukimura finds Thorkell refreshing because he never hides his true emotions. Whenever he is drawn, the character is shown enjoying his actions.

An addition to the anime adaptation of Vinland Saga is the first scene where Thors fights alongside Thorkell before retiring from the forces. The team was also careful with adapting the first fight between Thorfinn and Thorkell. Nevertheless, anime writer Hiroshi Seko believes Yukimura's version of the narrative is stronger. Once the series' fourth story arc started, Yukimura reflected on Thorfinn, telling a friend that the protagonist highlights how people can change in contrast to others like Thorkell, who do not want such an effect.

As the series is notorious for its violent first story arc, Yukimura noted that all the characters, including the protagonist Thorfinn, had no room for jokes. However, Thorkell is an exception and helpful to write comedy, as his characterization is that of a cheerful man who can change the violence into comedy. While Yukimura dislikes violence, he feels that he can handle the cruelty characterization Thorkell has. In retrospect, Yukimura regards Thorkell as an ideal madman, with his obsession for fights highlighting this concept. When it comes to the Merchant arc of the manga, Yukimura felt like he made a big gamble with writing Thorkell as a warrior because during his Nortic period it was weird to have elders as fighting as a result of the lower lifespan people had.

=== Casting ===
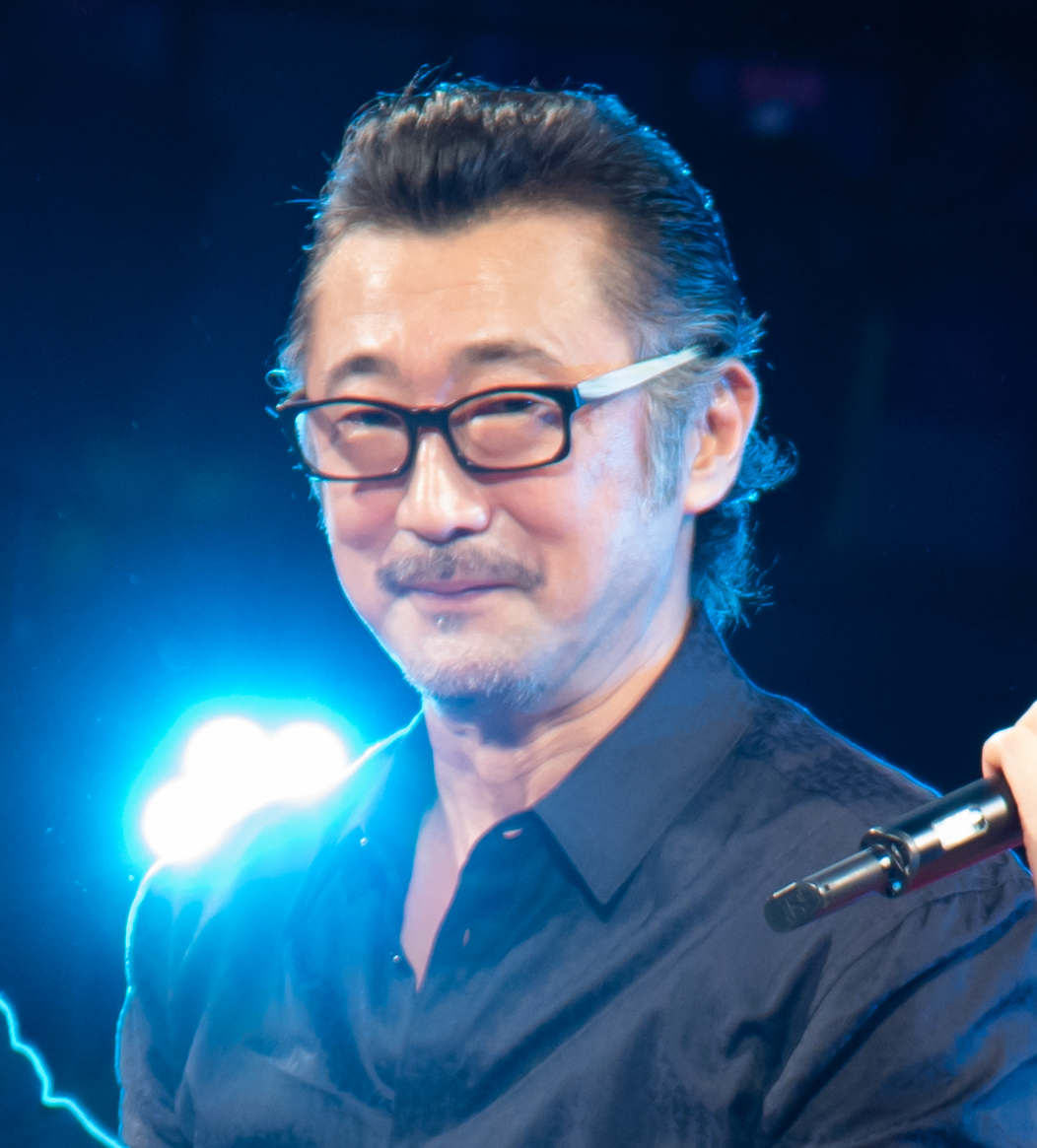
Akio Otsuka voices Thorkell in Japanese.

In the anime adaptation, Thorkell is voiced by Akio Otsuka in the Japanese version. Since Thorkell is in charge of comedy and there is a cute side, Akio Otsuka was especially with the pitch of his character serving as a comic relief. Otsuka thinks that searching for the criteria for where Thorkell feels frustration and fear is the boundary between whether or not the image of Thorkell can be clarified. Otsuka noted that Thorkell was popular not only for his superhuman strength but also for his sense of honor. Due to the multiple moods Thorkell displays in a few moments, Otsuka believes the handling of the character can be taken differently if it were an anime or a live-action.

Otsuka had learned about the Anglo-Saxon and Roman invasions a long time ago and could imagine that there were various conflicts among the people of Europe. In particular, Thorkell's views on religion and life and death were clearly different from those of other humans, so the voice actor thought it would be interesting to be able to express that properly. In his case, Otsuka tries to find out what kind of sound comes out of the body that fits in with the picture. In the case of Thorkell, although his body is large and he has a childish inside, the actor thought that he would make a voice like a lion. He tried to make a sound that does not force you to go along with the thin face and the hairstyle that looks like it is falling upwards.

In the English localization of Vinland Saga, Joe Daniels plays Thorkell in the Sentai Filmworks dub and Patrick Seitz in the Netflix dub. The stage play adaptations of the manga feature Takeshi Hayashino as Thorkell.

== Role in Vinland Saga ==
Thorkell is a general of the Vikings mercenaries Jomsviking and uncle-in-law of Thors, father of the mercenary protagonist Thorfinn. He fights with a band of Vikings called the Death Seekers, who share his love for war. This same love of war leads him to kidnap Prince Canute, son of the Danish King Sweyn Forkbeard who aims to conquer lands. Before the defection of Thors, Thorkell worked with and highly respected the man, resulting in a fondness for his son Thorfinn when facing him as the protagonist takes Canute from him. Thorkell duels twice with Thorfinn, initially defeating him in combat despite losing two fingers. When Thorkell attacks Thorfinn's superior Askeladd, the young protagonist attacks him in rage and manages to defeat him, taking an eye in the process. Nevertheless, Thorkell makes peace with Thorfinn's group out of respect in order to aid Prince Canute in killing King Sweyn. When Askeladd pretends madness to kill the king, Thorkell tries to face him out of confusion until Canute kills the Viking. Thorfinn attempts to kill Canute in response, but Thorkell stops the young warrior. In the manga's second story arc which takes place in the next few years, Thorkell continues to be a warrior but is disappointed by the growth of Canute, expecting him to deliver a prosperous utopia.

Thorkell returns in the third's manga arc in the Baltic Sea, demanding war. He meets an adult Thorfinn in joy and explains to his former enemy that the Jomsvikings need him as the new leader. Thorkell joins the present leader Floki's team to take down rivaling Vagn's side who opposes the group. However, upon realizing that Vagn has been killed without getting a chance to duel him, he faces the murderer, the mercenary Garm for the sake of a battle. Due to both fighters receiving several injures, the fight ends as a draw and they befriend. Thorkell is once again contacted by Thorfinn's group with Thorfinn's ally Einar proposing the idea to declare war against the leader Floki which he eventually accepts due to his love of war. Thorkell goes along with Thorfinn's plan to disband the Jomsvikings. Despite joining forces and being successful in the process, Thorkell challenges him to another if he wants to leave. As Thorfinn reluctantly takes the offer, a young woman named Gudrid confronts Thorkell in rage, claiming that he should stop the fight as Thorfinn does not want to get involved in violence again. After making her confess that she loves Thorfinn, Thorkell quits the duel, telling Thorfinn to take care of her.

Although Thorkell does not appear in the final arc, it is revealed he had a child named Cordelia who has been slaved by a man named Halfdan after unknown circumstances. As Thorfinn releases Cordelia, it is revealed that Thorkell's wife lied about Cordelia's gender so that Thorkell would not allow the child to fight like men.

== Reception ==
Critical response to Thorkell's character was generally positive. According to Anime News Network, the character "represents the slightly more exaggerated style of action and characterization", surpassing the already overpowered Thors, but in a more comical yet dark fashion as he does not care about his own wounds. 4Gamer.net enjoyed Thorkell's introduction for his fight against Thorfinn due to the animation of the fight choreography, which leads to the possibility of more of these similar battles. Anime UK News said that while Thorkell is initially presented as a main antagonist due to how he took Canute, the narrative does not make a black-and-white morality as Askeladd's forces are still presented as overly violent to civilians. Thorkell's fight against Thorfinn was nominated at the 4th Crunchyroll Anime Awards in 2020 for "Best Fight Scene" but lost to Tanjiro and Nezuko's fight against Rui from Demon Slayer: Kimetsu no Yaiba. Manga News found Thorkell's first meeting with Thorfinn interesting not only because of their fight but also because of their relationship, as Thorkell is fascinated by the protagonist's skills and remains interested in seeing him again due to their connection with Thors. The site felt that while Thorkell only cares about war, he retains a sense of war that makes him reliable to his own soldiers. The Fandom Post found the relationship between Thorkell and Thorfinn interesting but lamented how the latter is not changed by the fact that both know Thors or are related by blood. In a general overview of the manga, Anime News Network described Thorkell as possessing "psychotic enthusiasm", which is both "charming and terrifying", which makes him one of the most appealing fighters from the series' first story arc alongside Thorfinn and Askeladd. Manga.Tokyo has Thorkell was once again recognized for his fighting skills, despite having been inflicted several wounds by Thorfinn when they first met. Screen Rant cited Thorkell and his fight scenes as one of the best parts of the first story arc of the series and looked forward to his return in the second season, when Canute was confirmed to return as the King had this character under his command.

Following several battles, Anime News Network enjoyed how Thorkell was used for the first time in the narrative for character relationships rather than more battles, even if he is still comical when compared with the others. The revelation of him being linked with Thors and emotional past with him was also well received by the critic. His second battle with Thorfinn was also found enjoyable for how much honor Thorkell displays when he is taken down despite losing an eye in combat. Manga.Tokyo still called him a "madman" for how he loves fighting and his betrayal of the Vikings, just to make such conflict more interesting to him. His first fight against Thorfinn was praised not only for how well animated it was but also because of how the two warriors used their own skills to fight as a result of possessing different builds. In summarizing his introduction, Manga.Tokyo called Thorkell "the actual fortress, not the bridge" due to his massive strength. But Why Tho said that while Thorkell's appearance in the second season was brief, he still had a powerful and ominous exchange with Canute that excited the reviewer to see him again in the next episodes.

Thorkell was often the subject of analysis. According to Ashley D. Lake from University of California, Riverside, Thorkell, Thorfinn, and Askeladd are described as war veterans who seek Thors' answer to what makes them true warriors. However, due to Thors' death and Thorfinn never being properly raised by his father, the three characters never understood his ideal. CBR stated that Yukimura took liberties with his take on Thorkell, as he is playful and often interested in Thors' honor while he is still connected with Canute. In "European Middle Ages are seen through the prism of Contemporary Japanese Literature", the medievalist Maxime Danesin noted Yukimura takes liberties while also borrowing elements from real life when writing the character of Thorkell, giving him supernatural strength as well as alternative relationship with Canute.
