= Einar (Vinland Saga) =

Fictional character from Vinland Saga

- Vinland Saga character
- Einar, as drawn by Makoto Yukimura
- First appearance: Vinland Saga chapter 55: Slave
- Created by: Makoto Yukimura
- Voiced by: Japanese Shunsuke Takeuchi; English Ian Sinclair (Crunchyroll dub), Alejandro Saab (Netflix dub)

Einar (Japanese: エイナル, Hepburn: Einaru) is a fictional character from Makoto Yukimura's manga series Vinland Saga. Introduced in the series's second story arc, Einar is a former farmer from Northern England and becomes a slave when his family is killed by soldiers. He is bought by Ketil, a major landowner, to work on his large farm in southern Denmark; there, Einar is partnered with the protagonist Thorfinn. Across the series, Einar and Thorfinn befriend each other and share the same goals of becoming free, eventually desiring to create a utopia in Vinland once they are free from slavery.

Einar was created by Makoto Yukimura in order to create a supporting character for the manga in order to assist Thorfinn and help him come to appreciate his vitality. The staff from the anime adaptation decided to alter part of their story but keep his characterization intact which led to several discussions with his Japanese voice actor Shunsuke Takeuchi.

Critical response to Einar was positive for his kind portrayal and the brotherly bond he forms with Thorfinn even at their lowest. This bond is especially notable for how both seek to avoid the cycle of violence; the setting is used especially when deciding to form the utopia in Vinland.

== Role in Vinland Saga ==
Introduced in the manga's 55th chapter, Einar is an Anglo-Norse farmer from Northern England who, following attacks on his village, was sold into slavery and eventually ends up on Ketil's farm. As a result, he is outspoken in his hatred of war and injustice. Einar meets fellow slave Thorfinn at Ketil's farm, and the two become close friends. Despite being slaves, Einar and Thorfinn are victims of violence as the owners treat them poorly. Einar has little skill in combat but proves a loyal companion. As Einar and Thorfinn think about what to do once obtaining their freedom, Einar is conflicted since the woman he loves, the slave Arnheid, has no desire to leave the farm. Eventually, Einar and Thorfinn betray Ketil's forces to help Arnheid escape with her rebellious husband, Gardar, but the mercenary Snake kills him. Arnheid is then brutally punished by Ketil in the next days, which causes her death alongside her unborn baby. This causes Einar's rage and desire to kill Ketil, but Thorfinn stops him from committing murder, afraid he would become a sinner like him. Einar and Thorfinn promise to make a utopia in Vinland so that people like Arnheid would not suffer. Once the farm is free from King Canute's might, Thorfinn's friend Leif takes him to his country, Iceland. There, Thorfinn's mother of Helga adopts him as part of the family after learning of what happened to them.

After resting in Iceland, Einar joins Thorfinn's journey to finance the ship to Vinland by money in Greece through a deal with merchant Halfdan. Across their journeys, they find several allies but are targeted by Vikings who want Thorfinn. Wishing to face Thorfinn in combat again, mercenary Garm kidnaps Einar, Leif, and the sneaked Gudrid to take his enemy's attention, leaving behind Leif's adoptive son, Bug Eyes, to use him to communicate with Thorfinn. They are imprisoned in the Jomsborg stronghold of Jomvikings forces of warriors. Although Einar and Leif are free by Jomvikings Baldr, they fail to bring back Gudrid resulting in Thorfinn's quest to find her. After Thorfinn manages to disband the Jomvikings that went out of control, his group is allowed to continue their journey to Greece.

Years later, Thorfinn and Einar's group returns to Iceland with their new project to find Vinland with the money they obtained in Greece and business with Halfdan. Following their arrival, the group befriends natives through Thorfinn's leadership. However, when natives demand their departure from the land, Einar clashes with his sworn brother, believing they should fight back, as Thorfinn instead believes running away is the safest way. When Thorfinn is missing after being taken by natives, Einar replaces him and joins forces with his allies to fight while their youngest and most innocent people start escaping. The returning Thorfinn recognizes that Einar has killed but finds himself unable to judge him. Instead, the two make peace and agree to form a truce to end the war. However, an angered soldier, Stryk, refuses to let his comrades die in vain and tries to attack the natives. Einar stops him but is stabbed in the neck, suffering major bleeding. Thorfinn grabs Einar in shock, with his friend wondering what he could tell Arnheid about the afterlife now that he has killed. In the aftermath, Thorfinn buries Einar alongside a statue from Greece lamenting that he kept suffering war too.

== Creation ==
Manga artist Makoto Yukimura created Einar to support protagonist Thorfinn during the second arc of Vinland Saga in a similar fashion to Askeladd from the first arc. With the focus of Vinland Saga being slavery, Einar was created to be a complete victim of the war and slave trade. The manga author created a character who represented the victim of the slave trade and was an original character rather than one based on real life like Thorfinn or Leif. Einar represents "the pain and sorrow, and victimhood of war. He cannot be a strongly built person." As a result, he serves as the opposite of Gardar, another slave but with more strength.

Einar and Thorfinn form a close relationship, but they have several differences in regard to their pasts that they can rarely help each other. Across several things Thorfinn does in the manga, one of them was learning the effects of revenge and how it affects others. According to Yukimura, Einar is useless when Thorfinn is fighting, as they do not have the same dynamic often seen in action series like One Piece. Yukimura still wanted to show Einar's courage and friendship to the protagonist and wondered if he hit the spot. According to Yukimura, "There is no way Einar does not have anger towards violence. Having his family killed and enslaved. Still, it did not become 'all warriors are enemies' or 'all Danes are enemies'." This leads to the character nearly losing his sanity and hope the anime adaptation would improve on it.

Director Shūhei Yabuta and writer Hiroshi Seko had a strong impression of Einar when first reading the manga and had no idea where his strength came from. Upon discussing, they decided to change the way in which Einar becomes Thorfinn's friend. They found it to be the key factor for the appeal of the anime's second season, which led to several hours of planning. Yukimura kept reading the script as a result of their pressure from their work and looked forward to their portrayal. Despite several changes, Yabuta insisted that Einar was the same character featured in the manga. New scenes were added to explore more of their friendship. Yabuta described Einar as soft-spoken, kind, and strong, but even in the cruel setting of the series, he retains his kindness.

Yabuta kept talking with Yukimura about how they should write Einar, which led him to find the character realistic. Yukimura was surprised when talking with Yabuta about Einar's character to the point he realized that he might be superhuman-like. The director saw Einar's strength remarkable as a result of being to live as a slave and his subsequent friendship with the protagonist, Thorfinn.

=== Portrayal ===
According to Yukimura, the strength of Einar's vitality is really evident in his voice. Shunsuke Takeuchi's voice was praised by the manga artist for being "powerful" and "youthful", giving emotional strength. With the release of the fourth episode of the series's second season, Yukimura was surprised by the handling of the character and looked forward to more of these in the series. Takeuchi said there were several psychological overviews in regard to his role and found him important for the impact he has on Thorfinn to the point he considers him the axis of the story. Initially, he viewed Einar as a man who hates warriors, which made their interactions hard to do. Takeuchi met Thorfinn's Japanese actor, Yuto Uemura, to discuss the story together, which he enjoyed doing and made him look forward to his own work more.

Ian Sinclair voices him in the Crunchyroll dub, and Alejandro Saab in the Netflix dub.

== Reception ==
Upon his introduction in the anime's second season, several writers from Anime News Network praised Einar's backstory for how violent it is, fitting with the elements of violence displayed in the first season. UK Anime Network praised the relationship of Einar and Thorfinn as they become friends and help each other in quiet moments. Manga News enjoyed Einar's kindness as he managed to give Thorfinn comfort for the first time in his life since his father's death. Anime News Network found the early depiction of Einar relatable due to his desire to earn freedom, which causes him to contrast with Thorfinn, who barely expresses care about his status as a slave. According to Screen Rant, even as slaves, Einar and Thorfinn are victims of violence during the second story arc as the owners threaten to kill them. On the other hand, Comic Book Resources said that the second arc has potential for Einar and Thorfinn to escape from the cycle of violence despite their different pasts. According to The Escapist, Einar is part of the cycle of violence and revenge the series portrays as a theme due to how the anime further shows the downfall of his family at the hands of Vikings and starts hating warriors. Decider saw Einar as the opposite of Thorfinn due to their contrasting pasts as warrior and civilian respectively. In regards to Shunsuke Takeuchi's talent as a voice actor, Decider commented that Takeuchi is skilled at delivering several lines. Comic Book Resources praised Einar's and Thorfinn's commitment to create a utopia in Vinland where no more slaves like Arnheid are hurt, while reinforcing their bonds.

When first hearing that the Vinland Saga would focus on slavery, manga artist Hajime Isayama, famous for writing Attack on Titan, became interested in reading Vinland Saga. He was confused by the portrayal of Thorfinn for having become too silent to the point he did not understand him. As a result, he instead related more with Einar as he found him more realistic, especially because it is from Einar's point of view that Thorfinn matures as a person when the two are working together on the farm.

At the 9th Crunchyroll Anime Awards in 2009, Abhishek Sharma was nominated in the "Best Voice Artist Performance (Hindi)" category for his performance as Einar, but lost to Lohit Sharma's Satoru Gojo.
