= List of Vinland Saga characters =

Several major characters from the first arc of Vinland Saga

The major characters of the fourth arc of Vinland Saga

The manga series Vinland Saga by Makoto Yukimura contains a mixture of historical, apocryphal, and invented characters in its cast. The major characters are of Danish descent—Vikings brought to England to assist King Sweyn's invasion of the country. The series is divided into four story arcs focused on Thorfinn, a young viking who wishes to kill his superior Askeladd as revenge for the death of his father, Thors. In following arcs, an older Thorfinn questions his sins and decides to atone for them by finding the land Vinland which he was told as a child where people can live in peace. However, Thorfinn has issues with starting a new life as he encounters people related to his life as a viking who share interests of the young man.

The series was influenced by Makoto Yukimura's thoughts with vikings as they were hailed as heroes despite their violent methods with Thorfinn's development focusing on how to atone for his killings. As the story progresses, Yukimura creates new characters as needed to help the protagonist often using historical figures. Critical response to the cast has been positive for their traits and action scenes.

== Creation ==
While the vikings are recognized as heroes, Yukimura wanted to explain the harsh reality that was their era. Because of the harsh violence, the character of Thorfinn was always drawn with a serious expression in the first arc as well as with self-deprecation one in the following where he pitied himself for his sins. As a result, the character of Thorkell is characterized as more comical and thus makes the battles more enjoyable to draw. While Thorfinn's design changes across the manga, Yukimura gave attention to the several cuts in Thorfinn's hands as a result as a sign of always fighting alone. When drawing, Yukimura paid attention to drawing hands as he claims they are more expressive than faces and give a brief explanation of the person's personality. This was influenced by manga author Katsuhiro Otomo.

Yukimura insists that when writing the characters, most of them are who Thorfinn need with Askeladd being a rare exception as he is both Thorfinn's mentor and an enemy at the same time. Their relationship is also meant to look like father and son as during the beginning of the series, Yukimura was planning Askeladd's death and how Thorfinn would react to that. Another complicated relationship involves Einar and Thorfinn as the two cannot help each other due to dark narrative they are involved. Across several things Thorfinn does in the manga, one of them was learning the effects of revenge and how it affects others.

Several characters are based on real life. The historical Leif Eiriksson is one of the most famous Norsemen according to the author. However, Yukimura imagined that he would have had a very weak nature as a warrior so he instead fleshed him out as a strong adventurer. In retrospect, Yukimura found that the series features prominently male characters as the female ones either have few screentime or die. One of the few exceptions is Gudrid due to how she is based on Gudrid Thorbjarnardóttir who makes a major impact on Thorfinn's life and the author tries being faithful to such event. Meanwhile, the revengeful hunter Hild was made to remind Thorfinn of his sins as a viking in the same way with how the series starts with Thorfinn wanting revenge on Askeladd.

For the anime adaptation of the series, Wit Studio said there was a strong sense of camaraderie toward an individual, Askeladd, that brought them vikings together. They portrayed Askeladd as being able to take charge because others viewed him as powerful. They were also careful not to depict the supporting characters as overly dependent on their leader, as that would diminish their individual charm. The anime also added new scenes about how Thorfinn turned into one of Askeladd's soldiers rather than just make a time-skip which the manga artist appreciated. The director claimed that for these anime original scenes they also tried to keep Askeladd in-character. He further said that the story about Askeladd's forces was entertaining to see.

== Characters ==
=== Introduced in the first story arc ===
Thorfinn (トルフィン, Torufin)
Voiced by: Yūto Uemura, Shizuka Ishigami (childhood) (Japanese); Mike Haimoto (Sentai Filmworks / Crunchyroll dubs), Shannon Emerick (childhood, Sentai Filmworks dub), Aleks Le, Laura Stahl (childhood) (Netflix dub) (English)
Thorfinn is a teenage warrior in Askeladd's company, though he hates his commander for slaying his father Thors and has sworn to kill him in a duel. To earn the right to engage in these duels, he must complete difficult feats for Askeladd, such as sabotage or the killing of enemy generals. Thorfinn is a Jomsviking noble through his mother, Helga, and inherited superb physical talents from his father. He does not fight for the love of battle, but is still prone to losing his composure when in combat. This hotheadedness often costs him battles against more experienced opponents. He is loosely based on the historical personage of early Vinland explorer Thorfinn Karlsefni.
Askeladd (アシェラッド, Asheraddo)
Voiced by: Naoya Uchida (Japanese); David Wald (Sentai Filmworks / Crunchyroll dub), Kirk Thornton (Netflix dub) (English)
Askeladd is the commander of a small but powerful Viking band, which owed its success to Askeladd's exceptional intelligence. Ten years before the main Vinland Saga storyline, Askeladd accepted a contract to assassinate Thors, father of Thorfinn. During the Viking invasion and war in England, he manipulated Thorfinn's desire for revenge against him as a way of keeping the gifted young fighter in his service. Askeladd is one of the most skilled fighters in the series, and is particularly adept at predicting his opponents' moves in combat. He is half-Danish and half-Welsh, the son of a Welsh princess captured by a Viking raider; his mother gave him the name Lucius Artorius Castus, the legitimate king of Britain, but he received the nickname Askeladd (covered in ash) as a boy while working for a blacksmith. He believes in the legend of Avalon, which inspired him to support Prince Canute's bid for kingship of the Danes. He ultimately sacrifices himself assassinating King Sweyn in order to install Canute as the Danish King and to ensure the safety of Wales from Denmark. Askeladd shares the name of Askeladden, a Norwegian folk character known for his cleverness. His backstory is based on the early life of Olaf the Peacock, an Icelandic chieftain and major character of Laxdæla saga.
Bjorn (ビョルン, Byorun)
Voiced by: Hiroki Yasumoto (Japanese); Andrew Love (Sentai Filmworks / Crunchyroll dub), Ray Chase (Netflix dub) (English)
Bjorn is Askeladd's second in command, a burly man who fights for the love of combat. He is a berserker, able to enter powerful rages through the consumption of certain mushrooms. Bjorn was gravely wounded in Gainsborough by Atli, who stabbed him in the gut while he was protecting Prince Canute; with his remaining time, he challenged Askeladd in a duel. During the duel, Bjorn revealed that he always wanted to be Askeladd's friend, and Askeladd replied that he was his only friend, before dealing the final blow. Bjørn is Danish, Norwegian and Swedish for "bear", a given name commonly associated with Vikings.
Canute (クヌート, Kunūto)
Voiced by: Kensho Ono (Japanese); Jessie James Grelle (Sentai Filmworks / Crunchyroll dubs), Griffin Burns (Netflix dub) (English)
Canute is the 17-year-old prince of the Danes. He is initially portrayed as timid and womanly, and unable to function without his retainer Ragnar. These traits, along with his strong Christianity, earn him the mockery of the Vikings with whom he works. After Ragnar's death, however, he has a sharp reversal of personality, becomes strong and kingly, and develops an ambition to create utopia on Earth before God's return. Towards this end, he plots to overthrow his father Sweyn Forkbeard and take the crown of the Danes. Canute is based on the historical King Canute the Great, the most prominent Danish ruler of England.
Thorkell (トルケル, Torukeru)
Voiced by: Akio Ōtsuka (Japanese); Joe Daniels (Sentai Filmworks / Crunchyroll dubs), Patrick Seitz (Netflix dub) (English)
Thorkell is a Jomsviking general, brother of the Jomsviking Chief, uncle-in-law of Thors and grand uncle of Thorfinn. A giant man who loves combat, he defects from the Danish army to become a mercenary for the English, believing that fighting his fellow Vikings will give him a better challenge. This same love of war leads him to support Prince Canute's bid for kingship of the Danes. He remains under Canute once he becomes king. Before the defection of Thors, Thorkell worked with and highly respected the man, resulting in a fondness for his son Thorfinn. He duels twice with Thorfinn and dominates each time, though he loses two fingers in the first duel and an eye in the second. In battle, Thorkell typically wields a pair of axes as his primary weapons, but his greatest asset is probably his vast physical strength. Due to his colossal power, Thorkell is considered the strongest viking and warrior in the series, with one character believing that 4000 men aren't enough to stop Thorkell. He fights with a band of vikings who share his love for war. Thorkell's character is based on Thorkell the Tall, a historical Jomsviking lord who is a mentor to Canute in the Flateyjarbók.
Asgeir (アスゲート, Asugēto)
Voiced by: Ryōta Takeuchi (Japanese); Blake Weir (Sentai Filmworks / Crunchyroll dubs), Armen Taylor (Netflix dub) (English)
Asgeir is Thorkell's first lieutenant and closest advisor.
Leif (レイフ, Reifu)
Voiced by: Yōji Ueda (Japanese); John Swasey (Sentai Filmworks / Crunchyroll dubs), Frank Todaro (Netflix dub) (English)
Leif is a cheerful old man from Greenland. A sailor, he claims to have traveled to a distant western land called Vinland. When Thorfinn joins Askeladd's band and is assumed dead by the other Icelanders, Leif does not give up hope and devotes his life to finding him. He successfully locates him on a few occasions and eventually brings him back home, later agreeing to sponsor Thorfinn's trip to Vinland. He is based on the historical Leif Erikson.
Sweyn (スヴェン, Suven)
Voiced by: Takayuki Sugō (Japanese); Luis Galindo (Sentai Filmworks / Crunchyroll dubs), Jamieson Price (Netflix dub) (English)
Sweyn is Canute's father and the Danish king at the beginning of the series. Eventually revealed to be the main antagonist of the War Arc, he managed to conquer almost the entirety of England and Denmark, all the while keeping control of his more northern kingdoms. His wit, ferocity, ruthlessness and battle tactics kept everything under water-tight control. He tries to have Canute killed, believing him weak, in order to have his elder son Harald succeed him, but Canute's alliance with Askeladd proves to be his downfall and his son's ascent to the throne. He is eventually publicly beheaded by Askeladd, who sought to stop him from invading Wales. He is based on the historical Sweyn Forkbeard.
Floki (フローキ, Furoki)
Voiced by: Atsushi Ono (Japanese); Jay Hickman (Sentai Filmworks / Crunchyroll dubs), Keith Silverstein (Netflix dub) (English)
Floki is a Jomsviking commander one of the principal Viking commanders under Sweyn during the invasion of England and subsequently under Canute. He is the one who hired Askeladd to have Thors killed and helps Canute rise to the throne. Floki is entirely self-serving, willing to kiss up to anyone if it means more power to him, and long held a grudge against Thors because he felt that Thors looked down on him, hence why he had him killed.
Ragnar (ラグナル, Ragunaru)
Voiced by: Jin Urayama (Japanese); Rob Mungle (Sentai Filmworks / Crunchyroll dubs), Kyle Hebert (Netflix dub) (English)
Ragnar is Canute's chief retainer, having served him since he was a small boy. He also functioned as a foster father and guardian after Sweyn appointed him.
Gunnar (グンナル, Gunnaru)
Voiced by: Tsuguo Mogami (Japanese); Jeremy Gee (Sentai Filmworks / Crunchyroll dubs), Tony Oliver (Netflix dub) (English)
Gunnar is Ragnar's brother, who is a politician. After Ragnar's death, he serves as an adviser to King Canute.
Willibald (ヴィリバルド, Viribarudo)
Voiced by: Satoshi Hino (Japanese); Kyle Colby Jones (Sentai Filmworks / Crunchyroll dubs), J. Michael Tatum (Netflix dub) (English)
Willibald is a cynical friar who joins Askeladd on his journey with Canute, and later awakens the latter.
The Ear (耳, Mimi)
Voiced by: Makoto Furukawa (Japanese); John Gremillion (Sentai Filmworks / Crunchyroll dubs), Benjamin Diskin (Netflix dub) (English)
The Ear is one of Askeladd's scouts with a fantastic sense of hearing.
Atli (アトリ, Atori)
Voiced by: Shinya Takahashi (Japanese); Ty Mahany (Sentai Filmworks / Crunchyroll dubs), Kaiji Tang (Netflix dub) (English)
Atli is one of Askeladd's mercenaries, who would eventually lead a rebellion against him with his brother Torgrim, during Thorkell's assault.
Torgrim (トルグリム, Torugurimu)
Voiced by: Hiroki Gotō (Japanese); Orlanders Tao Jones (Sentai Filmworks / Crunchyroll dubs), Sean Chiplock (Netflix dub) (English)
Torgrim is one of Askeladd's mercenaries, who would eventually lead a rebellion against him with his brother Atli, during Thorkell's assault.
Thors (トールズ, Tōruzu)
Voiced by: Kenichirou Matsuda (Japanese); Jason Douglas (Sentai Filmworks dub), Greg Chun (Netflix dub) (English)
The father of Thorfinn, Thors is a Jomsviking general whose phenomenal combat prowess earns him the epithet "The Troll of Jom". Thors grows weary of battle after the birth of his children, fakes his own death at the Battle of Hjörungavágr, and retires to become a pacifist farmer after moving his family away in secret. The Jomsvikings later discover that Thors is alive and force him to return to the battlefield. Before he can arrive at the theater of war he is betrayed by a former comrade, Floki, who hires Askeladd to assassinate him. Thors is largely considered the greatest fighter to appear in the series until his death, having defeated Askeladd in single combat, and being the only man in the world who was stronger than Thorkell back when they were young. Such was his strength that Floki was unwilling to engage him directly, even with an entire squadron of Jomsviking warriors.
Helga (ヘルガ, Heruga)
Voiced by: Ao Takahashi (Japanese); Patricia Duran (Sentai Filmworks / Crunchyroll dubs), Julia McIlvaine (Netflix dub) (English)
Helga is Thors' wife and the mother of Thorfinn and Ylva.
Ylva (ユルヴァ, Yuruva)
Voiced by: Hitomi Nabatame (Japanese); Olivia Swasey (Sentai Filmworks / Crunchyroll dubs), Allegra Clark (Netflix dub) (English)
Thors' daughter and Thorfinn's older sister, who stayed in Iceland and took upon herself the duties of her father and brother.
Ari (ア ー レ, Āre)
Voiced by: Mitsuhiro Ichiki (Japanese); Tyler Galindo (Sentai Filmworks / Crunchyroll dubs), Billy Kametz (Season 1), Stephen Fu (Season 2) (Netflix dub) (English)
Ari is Thorfinn's childhood friend who was saved from Askeladd by Thors. Ari later became Ylva's husband and father of their four children.
Halfdan (ハーフダン, Hāfudan)
Voiced by: Yoshimitsu Shimoyama (Japanese); John Gremillion (Sentai Filmworks / Crunchyroll dubs), Kaiji Tang (Netflix dub) (English)
Halfdan is a wealthy and powerful lord in Iceland known for his ruthlessness, earning the nickname "Iron Chain" (鉄鎖 Tessa) for his skilled use of one as a weapon and symbol of his philosophy of chaining others.
Gorm (ゴルム, Gorumu)
Voiced by: Tadashi Miyazawa (Japanese); Chris Hutchison (Sentai Filmworks / Crunchyroll dubs), Doug Stone (Netflix dub) (English)
Gorm is Askeladd's paternal uncle and a feudal lord in a village located on the Jutland Peninsula, Denmark. He really loves gold and it brightens his heart, just by looking at it.
Hordaland (ホルザランド, Horuzarando)
Voiced by: Reina Kondō (Japanese); Alexis Tipton (Sentai Filmworks / Crunchyroll dubs), Ryan Bartley (Netflix dub) (English)
Hordaland is a former noble woman from Hordaland, Norway who was sold to Gorm as a slave due to her family losing a war.
Jabatthe (ジャバザ, Jabaza)
Voiced by: Kappei Yamaguchi (Japanese); Greg Cote (Sentai Filmworks / Crunchyroll dubs), J. Michael Tatum (Netflix dub) (English)
Jabbathe is a French nobleman, who with the help of Askeladd was able to overtake a strong opposing French fortress.
Gratianus (グラティアヌス, Guratianusu)
Voiced by: Jiro Saito (Japanese); Chris Rager (Sentai Filmworks / Crunchyroll dubs), D. C. Douglas (Netflix dub) (English)
Gratianus is a Welsh warrior serving as the commander of the army of the Kingdom of Morgannwg.
Asser (アッサー, Assā)
Voiced by: Tsuguo Mogami (Japanese); Josh Morrison (Sentai Filmworks / Crunchyroll dubs), Robbie Daymond (Netflix dub) (English)
Asser is a military envoy from Morgannwg's neighboring Welsh Kingdom, Brycheiniog.
Anne (アン, An)
Voiced by: Yumi Hara (Japanese); Jessica Boone (Sentai Filmworks / Crunchyroll dubs), Kayli Mills (Netflix dub) (English)
Anne is the sole survivor of a Mercian village whose inhabitants were massacred by Askeladd's band in December 1013.
Olaf (ウォラフ, Orafu)
Voiced by: Jiro Saito (Japanese); Sean Patrick Judge (Sentai Filmworks / Crunchyroll dubs), Jason Marnocha (Netflix dub) (English)
Olaf was a Norse warrior and the father of many bastard children borne from slaves, including Askeladd.
Lydia (リディア, Ridia)
Voiced by: Sayaka Ohara (Japanese); Joanne Bonasso (Sentai Filmworks / Crunchyroll dubs), Laura Post (Netflix dub) (English)
Lydia was a Welsh noblewoman who was captured and enslaved by the Norse warrior Olaf, eventually giving birth to their son Askeladd.

=== Introduced in the second story arc ===
Einar (エイナル, Einaru)
Voiced by: Shunsuke Takeuchi (Japanese); Ian Sinclair (Crunchyroll dub), Alejandro Saab (Netflix dub) (English)
Einar is an Anglo-Norse farmer from Northern England who, following attacks on his village, was sold into slavery and eventually ends up on Ketil's farm. As a result, he is outspoken in his hatred of war and injustice. Einar meets Thorfinn at Ketil's farm and the two become close friends and brothers. Einar has little skill in combat, but proves a loyal companion.
Lotta (ロッタ, Rotta)
Voiced by: Nao Tōyama (Japanese); Marisa Duran (Crunchyroll dub), Deneen Melody (Netflix dub) (English)
Lotta is Einar's little sister, who lived on the outskirts of an English village with her family, before the attack of Vikings.
Ketil (ケティル, Ketiru)
Voiced by: Hideaki Tezuka (Japanese); Doug Jackson (Crunchyroll dub), Sean Burgos (Netflix dub) (English)
Ketil is a Danish landowner who buys Thorfinn and then Einar as slaves.
Pater (パテール, Patēru)
Voiced by: Hiroshi Yanaka (Japanese); Sean Hennigan (Crunchyroll dub), Ben Lepley (Netflix dub) (English)
Pater is a farmhand and trusted advisor to Ketil, who was one of his former slaves in his youth.
Arnheid (アルネイズ, Aruneizu)
Voiced by: Mayumi Sako (Japanese); Natalie Van Sistine (Crunchyroll dub), Gilli Messer (Netflix dub) (English)
Arnheid is Ketil's slave, along with Thorfinn and Einar. She is Ketil's personal maid and concubine. Arnheid is a beautiful, slender woman with long wavy blonde hair. Kind, hard-working and honest, she tries her best to get through her slave life without trouble.
Snake (蛇, Hebi)
Voiced by: Fuminori Komatsu (Japanese); Christopher Sabat (Crunchyroll dub), Jason Griffith (Netflix dub) (English)
Snake is the leader of the mercenaries hired to protect Ketil's farm. He is far more intelligent and experienced than the men he commands, with a mysterious past spent in faraway lands.
Fox (キツネ, Kitsune)
Voiced by: Shinya Takahashi (Japanese); Derick Snow (Crunchyroll dub), Kaiji Tang (Netflix dub) (English)
Fox is a morally ambiguous mercenary working as a retainer on Ketil's farm and Snake's right-hand man.
Olmar (オルマル, Orumaru)
Voiced by: Yū Hayashi (Japanese); Anthony DiMascio (eps. 26–34), Ben Balmaceda ep. 35 (Crunchyroll dub), Ryan Colt Levy (Netflix dub) (English)
Olmar is the younger of Ketil's sons. He hates farming and dreams of going to war, although he is cowardly and inexperienced.
Wulf (ウルフ, Urufu)
Voiced by: Yasuhiro Mamiya (Japanese); Christopher Guerrero (Crunchyroll dub), Michael C. Pizzuto (Netflix dub) (English)
Wulf is King Canute's head thegn and his battle instructor, who is smitten with the king's younger sister, Estrid.
Badger (アナグマ, Anaguma)
Voiced by: Hiroki Gotō (Japanese); Daniel Baugh (Crunchyroll dub), Michael C. Pizzuto (Netflix dub) (English)
Badger is a member of Snake's mercenaries, who usually accompanies Fox in his less righteous activities.
Sverkel (スヴェルケル, Suverukeru)
Voiced by: Mugihito (Japanese); Greg Dulcie (Crunchyroll dub), William Salyers (Netflix dub) (English)
Sverkel is Ketil's elderly and frail father, who is stubborn, but wise and kind to his son's slaves and maintains a close relationship with Snake.
Thorgil (トールギル, Tōrugiru)
Voiced by: Taiten Kusunoki (Japanese); Brett Weaver (Crunchyroll dub), Earl Baylon (Netflix dub) (English)
Thorgil is eldest of Ketil's sons and an experienced fighter.
Estrid (エストリズ, Esutorizu)
Voiced by: Chinatsu Akasaki (Japanese); Molly Zhang (Crunchyroll dub), Kira Buckland (Netflix dub) (English)
Canute and Harald's naive younger sister.
Harald (ハラルド, Hararudo)
Voiced by: Takuya Satō (Japanese); TBA, Bryson Baugus (child) (Crunchyroll dub), Earl Baylon, Caden Shaffer (child) (Netflix dub) (English)
Canute's kind elder brother and the king of Denmark. He is based on the historical Harald II of Denmark.
Bug-Eyes (ギョロ目, Gyoro Me)
Voiced by: Tatsumaru Tachibana (Japanese); Josh Bangle (Crunchyroll dub), Chris Hackney (Netflix dub) (English)
Nicknamed Bug-Eyes, he is a trader who works with his adoptive father, Leif, who rescued him from slavery, because his birth name is also Thorfinn and Leif was searching for the Thorfinn he knew.
Gardar (ガルザル, Garuzaru)
Voiced by: Takuya Masumoto (Japanese); Jarrod Greene (Crunchyroll dub), Kyle Hebert (Netflix dub) (English)
Gardar is a Swedish warrior-turned slave and Arnheid's husband.
Drott (ドロット, Dorotto)
Voiced by: Kōji Takeda (Japanese); TBI (Crunchyroll dub), Kaiji Tang (Netflix dub) (English)
Drott the Bear Killer is a soldier serving as a personal guard to King Canute. He is notorious for his enormous physical strength and is well-respected among his comrades.

=== Introduced in the third story arc ===
Gudrid (グズリーズ, Guzurīzu)
Gudrid is a young woman originally from Greenland. As a child, she heard stories of the outside world from Leif and dreamed of becoming a sailor, but, as a woman, was not allowed to become one. She is Leif's sister-in-law, the widow of his brother Thorvald. She is set to remarry to Sigurd, son of Halfdan, but escapes on their wedding night and joins Thorfinn and Leif's party. Two years later she marries Thorfinn and they have adopted a son named Karli.^{[ch. 166]} Gudrid is based on the historical Gudrid Thorbjarnardóttir.
Sigurd (シグルド, Shigurudo)
Sigurd is the son of Halfdan and formerly the second husband of Gudrid. He seeks to prove himself worthy as an heir in his father's eyes, but Thorfinn's influence before and during the Baltic Sea War drives him to become a better man and let Gudrid be with the man she truly loves, while he settles down with his childhood friend, Hallgerd.
Hallgerd (ハトルゲルド, Hatorugerudo)
Hallgerd is Sigurd's childhood friend and first wife chronologically, however she is considered Sigurd's second wife in terms of importance by Halfdan. She is stubborn and very self-aware of her beauty, which is why she is jealous of Gudrid, who has political and financial importance to Halfdan's family. After Sigurd chooses to let go of Gudrid and stays with her, she gives birth to their son Njall.
Hild (ヒルド, Hirudo)
Hild is a female hunter from Norway. Originally an inventor and carpenter, her life changed when Askeladd's band attacked her village and killed her family. Many years later, she encounters Thorfinn and tries to kill him as vengeance. However, she is intrigued by his desire to create a peaceful society and temporarily spares him; she joins the party to ensure he is serious about it, and pledges to kill him if he returns to violence. However, after spending time with Thorfinn and his crew, she forgives him. She is armed with a custom crossbow that is designed for quick-fire reloading.
Karli (カルリ, Karuri)
Karli is the baby son of one of Leif's friends. A feud between families resulted in a viking massacre on his village, of which Karli was the sole survivor along his guardian dog. Orphaned and without relatives willing to take him in, he was adopted by Thorfinn and Gudrid.^{[ch. 166]}
Baldr (バルドル, Barudoru)
Baldr is Floki's ten-year old grandson and heir to his position as next commander of the Jomsvikings, since his parents were assassinated due rivalries within the Jomsvikings. Baldr is wise beyond his years and seeks to find a better life, than to be in constant conflict, which is why he strikes up a relationship of mutual understanding with Thorfin, whom he later learns, is his cousin.
Garm (ガルム, Garumu)
Garm is a psychopathic mercenary who wields a custom spear which can separate into two short spears whenever he desires to use them. He was considered an idiot and later a beast as a child due to his lack of morals, believing that war is a game and everyone fighting in it is his friend. Similar to Thorkell, he is obsessed with fighting those who are strong and tries to fight with Thorfinn multiple times throughout the Baltic Sea War saga and was responsible for the death of Jomsviking Captain Vagn as he wanted to fight him. He is defeated by Thorfinn and declares that he would face him again for a rematch, believing that the two are friends as he leaves.
Eskil (エスキル, Esukiru)
Eskil is a young Jomsviking loyal to Vagn, who tries to recruit Thorfinn to help Vagn overthrow Floki.
Wrage (ブラゲ, Burage)
Wrage is an experienced Jomsviking loyal to Vagn, who attempts to recruit Thorfinn to Vagn's cause.
Vagn (ヴァグン, Vuagun)
Vagn is a high-ranking Jomsviking veteran, who led a revolt against Floki, due to his affirmed suspicions, that Floki has long been assassinating Jomsviking commander candidates, so Baldr could inherit the title. He tries to instigate Thorfinn into eliminating Floki, by telling him that Floki was the one who hired Askeladd to kill Thors. While Thorkell was sent to challenge Vagn's forces to battle however, Garm infiltrates Vagn's camp and effortlessly kills him.

=== Introduced in the fourth story arc ===
Cordelia (コーデリア, Koderia)
Cordelia is a tall, strong, but kind woman, suspected to be Thorkell's daughter. Initially Halfdan's most hardworking slave under the name Halvar (ハルヴァル, Haruvaru), she is sent by Halfdan to join Thorfinn in Vinland as part of a business deal Thorfinn negotiates, basically freeing her.
Ivar (イーヴァル, Īvaru)
Ivar is a pessimistic farmer and warrior, who joins Thorfinn on his voyage to Vinland, while also seeking to prove that the latter's peaceful ideology is doomed to fail, despite respecting his determination.
Styrk (ストルク, Sutoruku)
Styrk is a cunning farmer and warrior, who seeks to help his friend Ivar wrestle leadership from Thorfinn in Vinland.
Ganglati (ガングラティ, Gangurati)
Ganglati is an older, stubborn farmer, who shares Ivar and Styrk's views of Thorfinn and his pacifism.
Vargar (ヴァルガル, Varugaru)
Vargar is a former Jomsviking turned pirate, who tried to raid Thorfinn's ships, but was defeated by Canute and sentenced to death by him. Due to Thorfinn persuading Canute to spare him, Vargar swears loyalty to Thorfinn and subsequently helps him ferry cargo between Thorfinn's settlement in Vinland and Iceland.
Plmk (プルムク, Purumuku)
Plmk is a scout member of the Mi'kmaq tribe who is the first to encounter Thorfinn's group and befriend them, beginning a pleasant partnership of sharing knowledge and resources.
Niskawaji'j (ニスカワジージュ, Nisukawajīju)
Niskawaji'j is a young Mi'kmaq woman training to be the next shaman, who quickly befriends Bug-Eyes and the two begin teaching each other their languages to become interpreters for their respective people.
Miskwekepu'j (ミスグェゲブージュ, Misugwegebūju)
Miskwekepu'j is the elderly shaman of the Mi'kmaq tribe, who is wary of the Norse arrivals due to the Natives' previous history with Leif's entourage two decades ago.
Gitpi (ギッピ, Gitupi)
Gitpi is the wise and optimistic chief of the Mi'kmaq tribe, who wants to be on good terms with the settlers of Arnheid village.
Mui'n (ムイン, Muinu)
Mui'n is an older Mi'kmaq warrior with three large scars on his face, who is inspired by Miskwekepu'j to try to drive the people in Thorfinn's settlement away and plunder their resources.

== Reception ==
Early response to the cast centered around the misrelationship between Thorfinn and Askeladd due to the former's quest for revenge against the latter even though they work together. Anime UK News said that while Thorkell is initially presented a main antagonist due to how he took Canute, the narrative does not make a black and white morality as Askeladd's forces are still presented as overly violent to civilians. The ending of the first season was well received for how a single death brought a major impact to both Thorfinn and Canute for how they change when such event occurs. Yukimura's artwork was praised for making every page of the manga overdetailed especially facial expressions. The action scenes the characters were involved into were the subject of praise for how well they were illustrated as well as because of the handling of the fighter Thorkell notable for his supernatural strength, Thorkell's fight against Thorfinn being a nominee in 4th Crunchyroll Anime Awards in 2020 for "Best Fight" but lost to Demon Slayer: Kimetsu no Yaiba.

Following Askeladd's death, critics were surprised by Thorfinn's quieter personality and his parallelism with a corrupted Canute while also giving focus on slaves even if it employed less action sequences. The inclusion of prominent female characters in the third story arc attracted more critics as the narrative usually was employed more male character in previous arcs instead. The romance between Thorfinn and Gurdrid was praised for giving the a more lighter tone to the manga famous for its violence. For the fourth story arc, Manga Sanctuary said Thorfinn now lives to his father's legacy during his quest while finding his new found family appealing.

There was also commentary behind the voice acting with the performances of Shizuka Ishigami and Yūto Uemura being praised by Anime News Network for the amount of yells the character performs. Decider also praised the English acting, singling out Allegra Clark's Ylva.
