= Askeladd =

Fictional character from Vinland Saga

- Vinland Saga character
- Askeladd, as drawn by Makoto Yukimura
- First appearance: Vinland Saga chapter 1 Normanni (2005)
- Created by: Makoto Yukimura
- Voiced by: Japanese Naoya Uchida; English David Wald (Sentai Filmworks dub) Kirk Thornton (Netflix dub)

Askeladd (Japanese: アシェラッド, Hepburn: Asheraddo), whose full name is Lucius Artorius Castus (ルキウス・アルトリウス・カストゥス, Rukiusu Arutoriusu Kasutusu), is a fictional character from the manga series Vinland Saga by Makoto Yukimura. Askeladd, the leader of a band of a hundred Vikings, bargains with Jomsviking commander Floki to kill the deserting warrior Thors. After a fierce swordfight, Thors defeats Askeladd but surrenders to save his son, the protagonist Thorfinn, and his villagers. After seeing his father's death, Thorfinn swears revenge against Askeladd, who recruits him into his group despite knowing his intentions.

The character was created by Yukimura to serve as a mentor to the inexperienced Thorfinn, despite both of them being enemies. Yukimura wrote him carefully until his last scene, which he calculated by writing his personality. In the end, the author was confused by how the character was written, as he felt the character became another father figure to Thorfinn, especially in his last moments. In Japanese, the character is voiced by Naoya Uchida, while David Wald and Kirk Thornton voice him in two separate English dubs.

Critical response to Askeladd was generally positive for being a striking villain and his relationship with Thorfinn. He was also listed as one of the best anime characters of 2019. Although Askeladd does not appear in the second arc, critics noticed the effect he had on Thorfinn, who tries to move through a different path than Askeladd's.

== Creation ==
Askeladd shares the name of Askeladden, a Norwegian folk character known for his cleverness. His backstory is based on the early life of Olaf the Peacock, an Icelandic chieftain and major character of the Laxdæla saga. Manga author Makoto Yukimura commented that while most Vinland Saga characters were made to assist the protagonist Thorfinn, Askeladd was an exception. Because Thorfinn was inexperienced during the series' beginning, Askeladd was written to be a mentor figure who would lead him in the first story arc. He said that his relationship with Thorfinn was that of a father and son, respectively, as well as of enemies. The more the manga author wrote about these two characters, the more ambiguous it became, as he could not tell whether Askeladd was a good person or a hateful one. Askeladd had several contradictions, but he felt he was interesting like this. Yukimura early considered Askeladd a rudderless, disobedient habit that does its job and has some interesting behavior. Since the series is based on Vikings, Yukimura went to Norway and Scandinavia in 2003 to conduct research on Vikings. He was able to see the Oseberg Ship, which he says is the most beautiful ship he has ever seen, which Askeladd's forces use.

Several of Askeladd's lines are based on Yukimura's thoughts from his youth. When Askeladd makes fun of a slave and especially his owner for valuing themselves over money. Nevertheless, Yukimura ended up believing that society is slave of money itself. According to the author, Askeladd is a rather difficult character to understand but not completely bad when fully analyzed as he values others he would gladly follow like when trying to understand Canute. His friendship with Bjorn was not fully developed which was emphasized by their final interactions when the dying soldier asks Askeladd if they could have become friends at least. His relationship with Thorfinn was also seen close to that of a father and son despite their antagonism with the elder viewing himself as inferior during his last moments and urging Thorfinn to take a better life and follow Thor's values about becoming a true warrior rather than attack Canute.

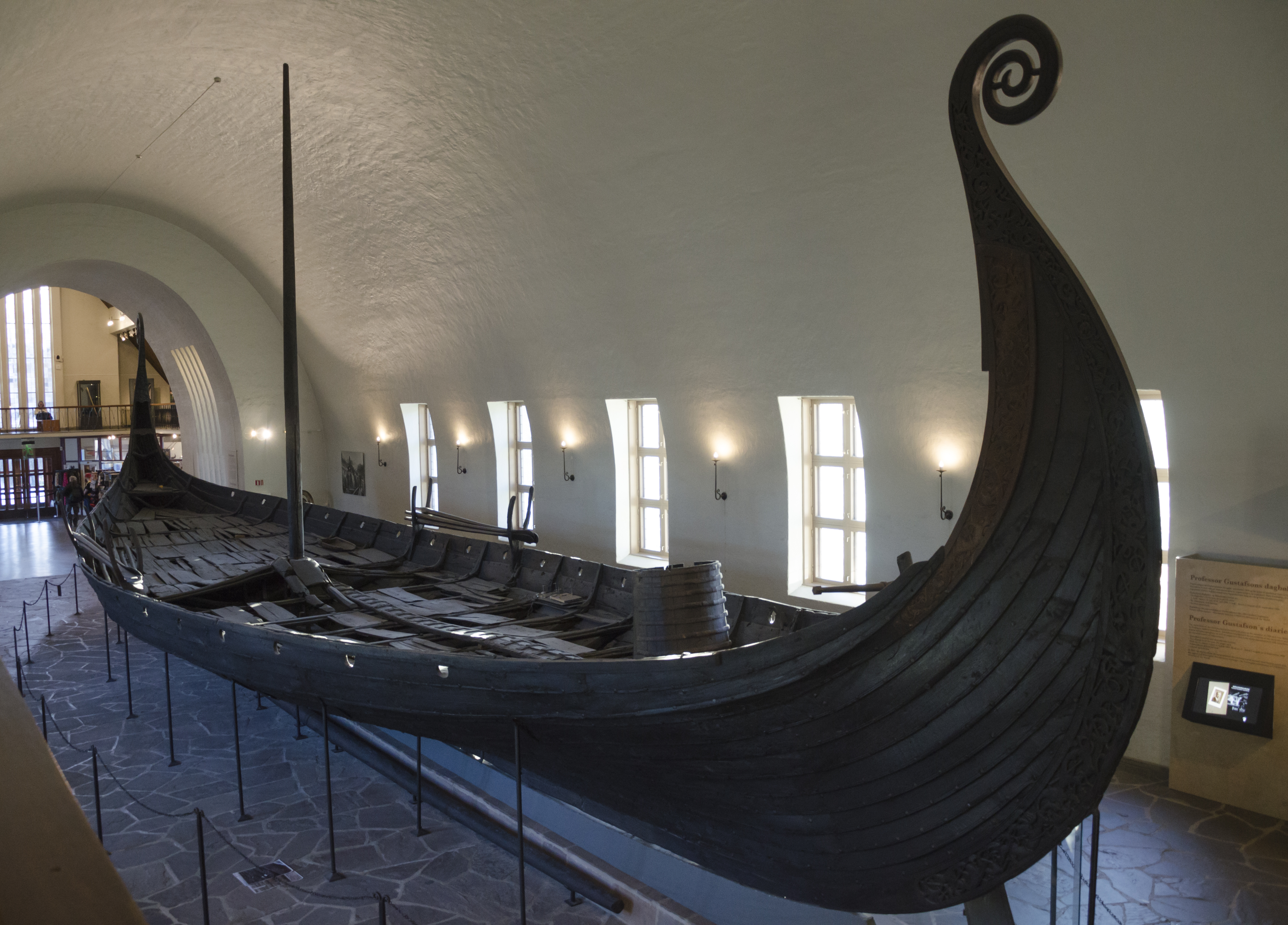
An example of an Osebergskipet ship that Askeladd's group uses.

Despite Askeladd's ruthless and violent character, Yukimura felt that he was still appealing. The author believes that Askeladd tends to escape from battles he cannot win and thus was out of character when acting desperate in front of Torgrim. His ideal of having more power is the greatest turning point for him. This led to the idea of Askeladd joining forces with Prince Canute to take over Sweyn's forces while manipulating the future King. Askeladd's last yell towards Thorfinn, when he kills Sweyn and pretends to be insane, was written at the last moment. Yukimura felt that Askeladd would show more humanity towards Thorfinn in his last moments when writing the chapter. Yukimura sees Askeladd as Thorfinn's second father, even though his personality is cold and inspires him to become violent. These father-and-son relationships are common in Vinland Saga, and they were all written from Yukimura's experience as a father.

For the anime adaptation, Studio Wit said there was a strong sense of camaraderie toward an individual, Askeladd, that brought the Vikings together. They portrayed Askeladd as being able to take charge because others viewed him as powerful. They were also careful not to depict the supporting characters as overly dependent on their leader, as that would diminish their charm. The anime also added new scenes about how Thorfinn turned into one of Askeladd's soldiers rather than just making a time-skip, which the manga artist appreciated. The director claimed that for these anime-original scenes, they also tried to keep Askeladd in character. He further said that the story about Askeladd's forces was entertaining to see.

Yukimura claimed that due to the Vikings being famous for committing violent deeds, he decided to write a story where Askeladd's group murders an innocent Christian family in order to generate a major shock within the readers. "In that world, Christians work hard with fear every day to get to heaven someday, but when they see Askeladd destroy their common sense in such a way, Anne feels guilty for feeling a certain admiration for it." Askeladd's deeds were also meant to shock the only surviving woman, who wonders whether the God she prays to is real. Askeladd's violence is also motivated by survival, and thus he kills people for the sake of it. This was also done because Yukimura wanted the character to be seen more as a villain.

=== Casting ===
Naoya Uchida received an offer from the studio to voice Askeladd. He was asked not to read the original manga during the recording of the series. Despite Thorfinn's role, Uchida said his character has always been at the center of the story, and he was able to focus on the role and felt it was comfortable to play. At first, it was difficult to grasp the image of the character, but as he acted, he was made to feel the human way of life that is moved by the past and changes occur again depending on the reality in front of him. In the recording of the series, Uchida met Hiroki Yasumoto, who played Bjorn, Askeladd's subordinate. He was impressed by Yuto Uemura and Matsuda's recording due to the focus they tend to give Askeladd. In his first appearance, the scene was Askeladd's voice from 10 years ago, so Uchida exchanged opinions with the director and adjusted it between three and four times. Following the series' first time-skip, Uchida had a change of mind in regard to his character due to the flashback that depicts his past.

David Wald played the character in the Sentai Filmworks dub, while Kirk Thornton voiced him in the Netflix dub. The ADR director of the Sentai dub, Kyle Colby Jones, said Askeladd was going to be Wald because he has "that perfect temperament to be an outright bastard but still likeable".

The stage play adaptations of the manga feature Takashi Hagino portraying the character of Askeladd.

== Appearances ==
Askeladd is the commander of a small but powerful Viking band, which owed its success to Askeladd's exceptional intelligence. He is half-Danish and half-Welsh, being the son of a Welsh princess captured by a Viking raider. In his introduction, Askeladd gives missions to the series' protagonist, Thorfinn, rewarding him with duels, in which Thorfinn consistently tries to kill him and avenge his father, Thors. The relationship between Askeladd and Thorfinn is seen in a flashback where Askeladd is ordered to kill the latter's father, Thors. Despite being defeated by Thors, Askeladd accomplishes his mission by taking his soldiers hostage. The young Thorfinn would keep chasing Askeladd for a decade, hoping he would accomplish revenge for his father's death. During the Viking invasion and war in England, he manipulates Thorfinn's desire for revenge against him as a way of keeping the gifted young fighter in his service and has him rescue Prince Canute from the Viking Thorkell.

When Askeladd's soldiers betray him for their safety against Thorkell's soldiers, Thorfinn comes to Askeladd's aid. With Askeladd's aid, Thorfinn manages to defeat Thorkell in one-on-one combat. Thorkell makes peace with Askeladd, who decides to take down King of Denmark Sweyn Forkbeard with the aid of his son, Canute. Askeladd's soldiers leave him, with his second-in-command, Bjorn, dying in a last duel. In his next duel with Thorfinn, Askeladd reveals he is the son of the Viking Olaf and a slave woman whom he treated badly. His mother gave him the name Lucius Artorius Castus, the legitimate king of Britain, but he received the nickname Askeladd (covered in ash) as a boy while working for a blacksmith. Askeladd believes in the legend of Avalon, which inspired him to support Prince Canute's bid for the kingship of the Danes and ultimately sacrifice himself by assassinating King Sweyn in order to install Canute as the Danish King and to ensure the safety of Wales from Denmark. After this, Askeladd defeats Thorfinn and moves on with his plans. Askeladd kills King Sweyn while feigning madness and let Canute be the one to reign the country instead. Thorfinn chases after him which distracts the Viking who is stabbed by Canute in the process. In his last moments, an angered Thorfinn shouts at Askeladd to recover and fight again like promised, but Askeladd dies, telling Thorfinn to become a true warrior.

Despite Askeladd's death, the character continuously appears in Thorfinn's nightmares, which haunt the path he chose after Thors' death. However, upon deciding to bring peace to his friends and family, Thorfinn has a hallucination of Askeladd and Thors when talking with one of his mentors, Leif Erikson. Thorfinn smiles and refers to the three as his fathers.

== Reception ==
Critical response to Askeladd was generally positive. Anime News Network listed Askeladd as one of the best characters of 2019 for his striking personality despite his violent actions. In the Anime UK News Readers Choice Awards, he was a runner-up in "Best Character", losing to Senku Ishigami from Dr. Stone. Rebecca Silverman for Anime News Network praised the design of Askeladd for how appealing he is: "He practically oozes underhanded nastiness without being drawn as an exaggerated farce of a man". He was also nominated for "Best Antagonist" at the 4th Crunchyroll Anime Awards in 2020. Having called Thorfinn's initial characterization in the series flat, the same site also went to call Askeladd and Canute more notable protagonists in the first arc of the Vinland Saga than Thorfinn himself. Despite calling him a villain that "steals every scene" he is featured in, Anime News Network noticed that Askeladd granted Bjorn's last wish of having a warrior's death, something commonly known in Norse culture. Askeladd's humanity is further explored through his relationship with his underling Bjorn, whom he kills in combat after he suffers a major wound but gives him a dignified death fitting of what Vikings want to experience. In The European Middle Ages through the prism of Contemporary Japanese Literature, Maximen Denise from the University of Tours noted that the main motivation featured in the manga also explores his desire to have power similar to "those who desperately struggle to find their homelands in the 21st century 'medieval' Japan". Den of Geek said that while Askeladd committed several crimes in the story to the point of being portrayed as a psychopath, there are several actions he takes, like protecting Canute or his usage of Thorfinn across a decade, as a surprising difference that makes the character feel less antagonistic and instead heroic. According to Ashley D. Lake from UC Riverside, Thorkell, Thorfinn, and Askeladd are described as war veterans who seek Thors' answer to what makes them true warriors. However, due to Thors' death and Thorfinn never being properly raised by his father, the three characters never understood his ideal.

There was also a comparison between Askeladd's relationships. Polygon compared Thorfinn to The Northman's protagonists due to their similar quests for revenge and how both are based on historical figures. Polygon further praised the relationship between Thorfinn and Askeladd, as the former sees him as both his biggest enemy and a father figure at the same time due to the time they spend together. Otaku USA enjoyed the concept of Askeladd and Thorfinn due to how they become enemies due to the latter's thirst for revenge and how they become allies at the same moment. UK Anime Network found him enjoyable due to how he takes Thorfinn and, more importantly, Canute, which makes a major change in the narrative. The Escapist Magazine said Askeladd appeared to share several parallels with Thorfinn and Canute in the anime's first season as the three of them seek revenge against their parents, and the narrative instead shows that none of them gain anything from such an act. Askeladd's death was praised for the impact he makes on Thorfinn, as the dying warrior sees his subordinate in a sympathetic form during his last moments. Anime News Network highlighted how carefully planned Askeladd was. He accepted his death when provoked by the King and decided to kill him regardless of the cost. As a result, the reviewer said that, "To put it bluntly, Askeladd's death scene is probably the single best moment of the series" due to the impact it has on Canute and Thorfinn.

Golden Kamuy artist Satoru Noda said Askeladd is his favorite character from Vinland Saga, as he exudes Yukimura's personality the most. He also stated that he liked skilled professionals like the Ear, but even when he thought that he was good, he laughed when seeing his cruel, merciless eyes. In response, Yukimura was glad by the answer and said the character became ambiguous even to himself. Hajime Isayama, the creator of Attack on Titan, was surprised by Askeladd's death, most specifically by how Wit Studio animated it in the season finale. Thorkell's Japanese voice actor, Akio Otsuka, also praised Naoya Uchida's performance as Askeladd. At the 7th Crunchyroll Anime Awards in 2023, Torsten Michaelis was nominated in the "Best Voice Artist Performance (German)" category for his performance as Askeladd, but lost to Nicolás Artajo's Yuta Okkotsu.
