= Thorfinn (Vinland Saga) =

Fictional character from Vinland Saga

- Vinland Saga character
- Thorfinn as drawn by Makoto Yukimura with his four forms, as a child (bottom left), warrior (bottom right), slave (top left), and merchant (top right).
- First appearance: Vinland Saga chapter 1: "Normanni" (2005)
- Created by: Makoto Yukimura
- Voiced by: Japanese: Yūto Uemura; Shizuka Ishigami (childhood); Yoshitsugu Matsuoka (Lord of Vermilion); English: Mike Haimoto; Shannon Emerick (childhood) (Sentai Filmworks dub); Aleks Le; Laura Stahl (childhood) (Netflix dub)

Thorfinn (Japanese: トルフィン, Hepburn: Torufin), also called Thorfinn Karlsefni (ソルフィン・カルルセヴニ, Torufin Karurusevuni) and Thorfinn Thordarson (ソルフィン・ソルザルソン, Torufin Soruzaruson), is a fictional character and the protagonist of the manga series Vinland Saga by Makoto Yukimura. Thorfinn is introduced as a teenage warrior of Askeladd's Viking company. He hates his commander for slaying his father Thors and has sworn to kill Askeladd in a duel. To earn the right to fight such a duel, Thorfinn must complete difficult tasks for Askeladd, such as sabotage or the killing of enemy generals. After over a decade of being a Viking, the adult Thorfinn starts questioning his actions and reflects on his earlier dream of a land without violence.

Yukimura based the fictional character on Thorfinn Karlsefni, an Icelandic explorer who explored Vinland alongside Leif Eriksson. Yukimura took multiple liberties when creating the fictional Thorfinn as a soldier who initially commits horrible acts as a Viking but grows up to be more caring in later chapters, trying to understand other people and redeem himself. Thorfinn is also heavily influenced in this by the king of Norway Olaf Tryggvason. In the anime adaptation of Vinland Saga, multiple voice actors portray Thorfinn's child and adult personas.

Initial critical response to Thorfinn was mixed. Although his backstory and loss of innocence were considered tragic, he was criticized for his rude demeanor. Nevertheless, his fight scenes were praised. The protagonist's growth across the story arcs was praised for giving the character further depth, most notably when living as a slave. The portrayal of Thorfinn's character was also the subject of analysis by scholars for how the brutal man rejects toxic masculinity and becomes a more positive model. The actors voicing Thorfinn were also praised.

== Creation ==
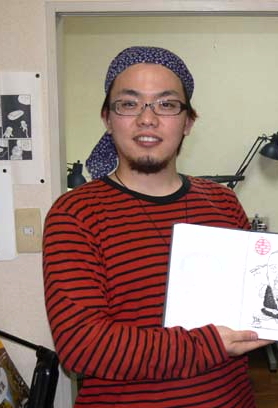
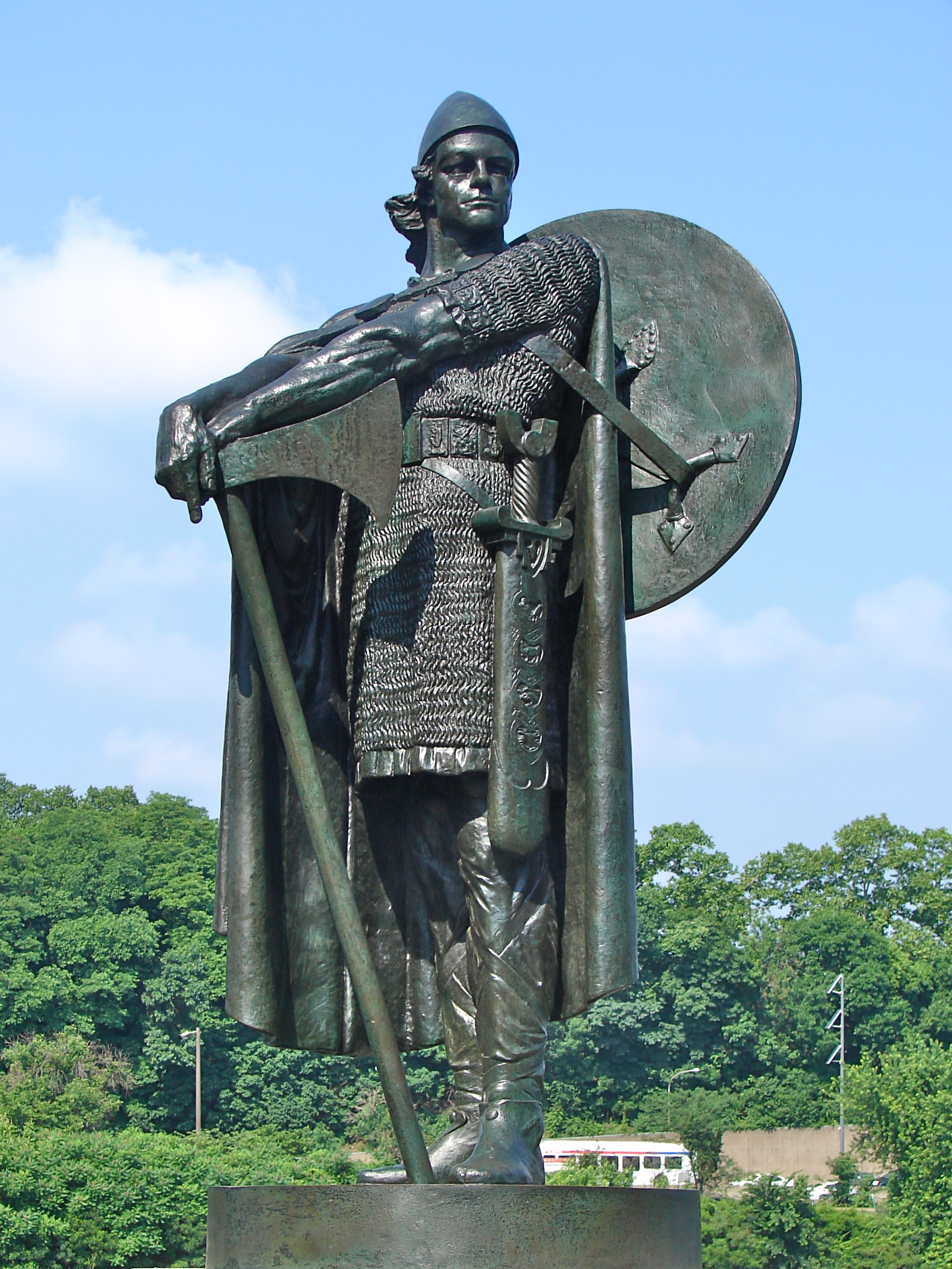
Makoto Yukimura (left) created the character of Thorfinn using a historical figure with the same name (right).

The concept of Thorfinn, according to Yukimura, is that of a protagonist fated to do violence. He wanted to create a violent character who grows to love peace after a major conflict ended the idea of a revenge quest which would be end point of traditional storytelling. Another major influence was Kenshiro, the protagonist of Fist of the North Star, a manga he often read. While Kenshiro was always portrayed as heroic fighter in chaotic world, Yukimura had mixed feelings about how the protagonist tried to help others, which gave him ideas for what type of hero Thorfinn could be as he believed Kenshiro had the potential of changing society in early chapters. Thorfinn is loosely based on the historical personage of early Vinland explorer Thorfinn Karlsefni. The story of the real Thorfinn attracted Yukimura when he was reading a book. There is little information about the real Thorfinn, which gave Yukimura more freedom in developing the fictional character. Several fans asked Yukimura about Thorfinn's birthday. Yukimura replied that the birth date of the real Thorfinn is not known. Nevertheless, he gave his fictional Thorfinn's birthday as February 3.

Yukimura's editor was against the original idea of Thorfinn being a slave; so the character was changed to that of a Viking. The author agreed as he wanted Thorfinn to come to understand the tragedy he causes as a Viking, in later parts of the narrative. Yukimura believes Thorfinn's growth with fellow Viking Askeladd was well executed. Yukimura insists that when writing the characters, most of them are there to help Thorfinn's needs, with Askeladd being a rare exception, as he is both Thorfinn's mentor and an enemy. Thorfinn's and Askeladd's relationship is also meant to look like father and son, as in the beginning of the series, Yukimura was planning Askeladd's death and how Thorfinn would react to that. Another complicated relationship involves Einar and Thorfinn, as the two cannot help each other due to a dark narrative in which they are involved. Among several things Thorfinn does in the manga is learning the effects of revenge and how it affects others.

The staff discussed what kind of condition Thorfinn was in as he returned from the events of the season finale. They could not use him effectively as a character without working out just how much savagery remained in him. Thorfinn's and Einar's relationship was also an essential part of the story in terms of its entertainment factor, so the staff was glad they spent so much time on it. That relationship was seen as one of the strongest parts of the anime.

While Thorfinn's design changes across the manga, Yukimura paid attention to the several cuts in Thorfinn's hands, a result as a sign of his always fighting alone. Thorfinn becomes an adult in the second story arc, but he shaves his beard. The author explained that the reason for causing Thorfinn to lose his beard was that it made him look too strong when he wanted Thorfinn to look weak. The final story arc was heavily based on real life events as Thorfinn meets the natives of Vinland: the Mi'kmaq. In August 2023, he was conflicted about how to make this arc look more hopeful.

=== Characterization and themes ===
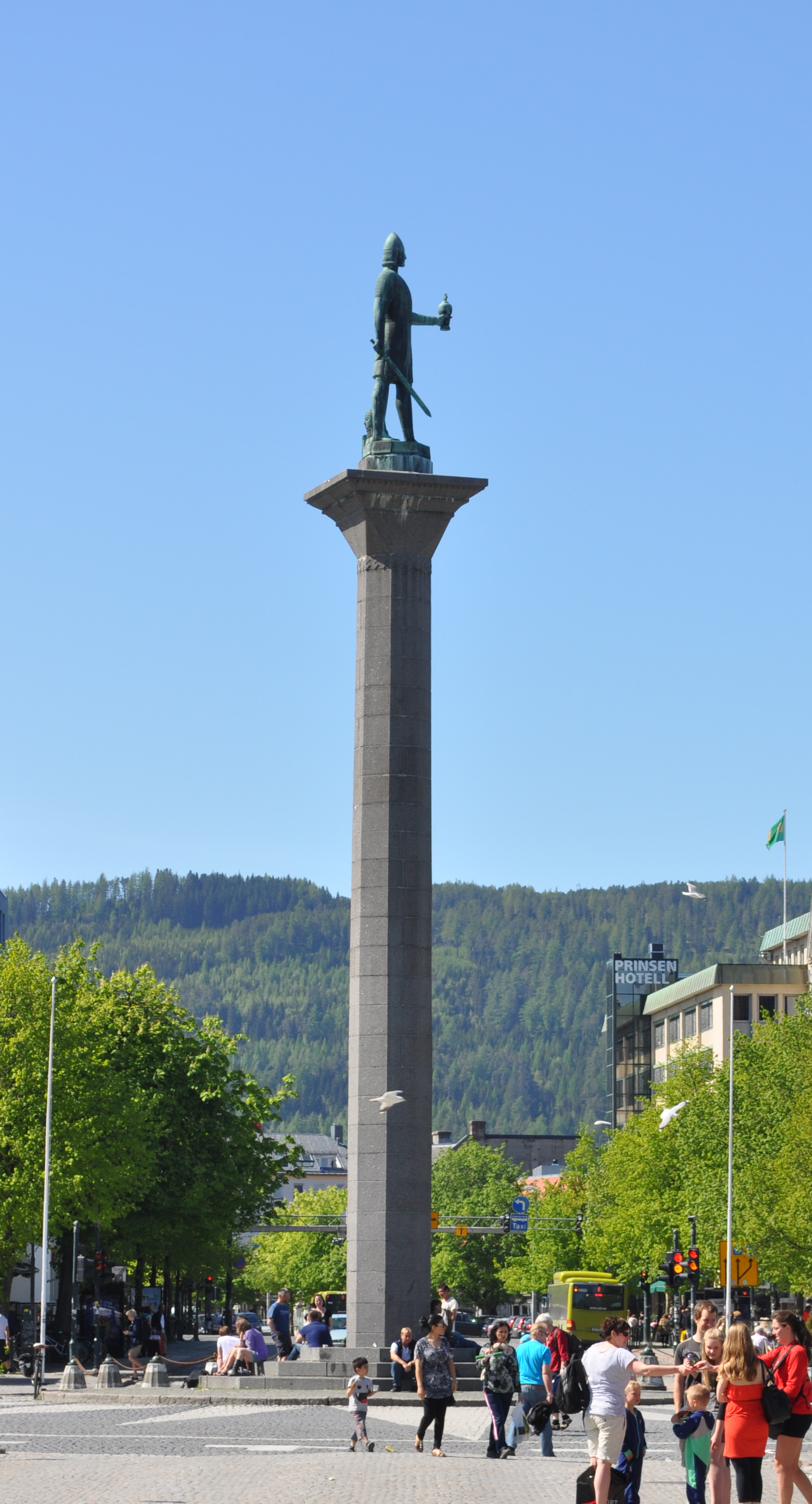
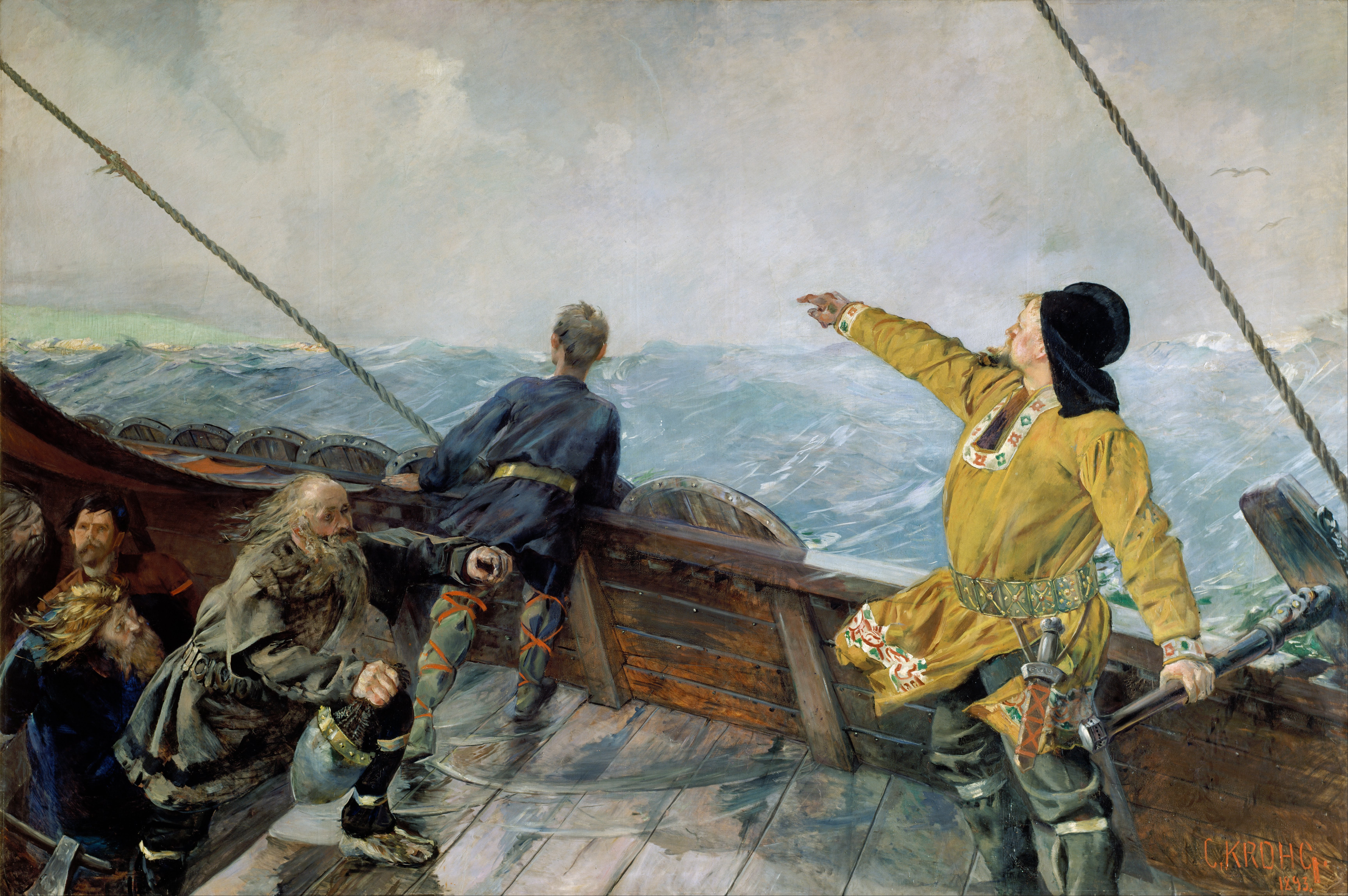
Thorfinn's growth was inspired by Olaf Tryggvason due to how they change from slaves to pacifists (left) while the search for Vinland serves as a major escape from the violence, a theme the author wants to focus on (right).

Thorfinn's childhood involves his desire to seek adventures around the world. His desire to be a warrior worries his father, Thors, who tries to educate him by claiming he should not have enemies. Yukimura emphasizes that these teachings reflect how people often feel the need to compete with each other to succeed at life. Instead, Thorfinn has to learn that he should only do things he love rather than joining the Vikings which were common in such era. However, Thorfinn becomes corrupted with rage when marauders kill his father, relinquishing his humanity to become a warrior, something the first opening theme of the anime series highlights. As a symbol of his transformation into a warrior, Yukimura has Thorfinn constantly carry the dagger Thors gave him before dying. Thorfinn was also meant to wear Leif's headdress, as it is claimed only a warrior may wear it. However, the author found it redundant and Thorfinn only keeps the dagger in the first story arc as a form of memento. Thorfinn's relationship with his father and Askeladd was based on Yukimura's thoughts when he became a father. Yukimura regards the father and son relationship as a common theme Vinland Saga explores. Due to Thorfinn's harsh upbringing, Yukimura said there was little room for humor involving Thorfinn in the first story arc. As a result, Yukimura created more characters like Thorkell, who are often the subject of comedy due to their personalities contrasting with that of Thorfinn. Askeladd's death in the first story arc causes Thorfinn to have a mental breakdown to the point it feels like seeing Thors dying again as a result of still feeling his enemy was another father.

One of the earliest concepts when drawing Thorfinn for the manga was making a story about a slave. Despite being a slave, Thorfinn would face several challenges in reaching his goal. He was inspired by the King of Norway Olaf Tryggvason, who lost his position as a king and became a slave but managed to reacquire kingship. Unlike Tryggvason, Thorfinn was written to face several new problems. Yukimura wanted Thorfinn to learn about oppression and human afflictions. Yukimura stated that Thorfinn does not have a notable skill or great strength. In order to stand out as a main character, he was written to experience the pain human beings suffer. After Thorfinn is a slave, the character grows to the point that he might be unrecognizable. Thorfinn's enslavement also resulted in his being more expressive due to his wrath. While Thorfinn becomes a pacifist during his time as a slave, he still tells himself that there are times in which violence is often needed. During his life as a slave, Thorfinn realizes the pain he has caused as a Viking as a build up to have him properly search for redemption in his new quest. This eventually leads to his relationship with the vengeful Hild whose village was taken by the Vikings. As the final arc of the manga was written, Yukimura expressed joy when writing Hild forgiving Thorfinn.

In the following story arcs, where Thorfinn expresses himself more frequently, Yukimura writes that the protagonist is still wrathful. The vengeful hunter Hild was created to remind Thorfinn of his sins as a Viking, in the same way, that the series starts with Thorfinn wanting revenge against Askeladd. Thorfinn's quest for Vinland comes from Yukimura's interest in how the people of Northern Europe reached the Americas more than 400 years earlier than Christopher Columbus' discovery. However, when he looked into it, he wondered how the Icelanders, who originally came from Norway, went further to Greenland and Vinland. Yukimura's thoughts about the Cold War and the September 11 attacks were projected onto Thorfinn's character, who is traumatized by his actions as a Viking and so decides to find Vinland in order to make a land where people from different races are able to live together peacefully.

Thorfinn's characterization changes once again when ending his time as a slave, and he has a dream involving the creation of a peaceful country. This was inspired by an escape from Norse society, which, as Thorfinn states, creates chaos and believe there is nothing wrong with their actions. Initially, Thorfinn hates that society but is too weak to change it. This leads to Thorfinn's meeting Prince Canute, who wants Thorfinn to realize his dream. Even though Thorfinn stops being a warrior, he has no right to condemn others. No matter what violent enemy he meets, Thorfinn feels that he has done something worse in the past. Yukimura believes this is how Thorfinn should be written. Thorfinn's quest for redemption once grown-up is relatable to Yukimura's life due to how he has been focused on his work for two decades. Thorfinn was written to be an ideal hero, something that Yukimura finds it hard to write but believes it is his job as a write to give his readers such protagonist.

With the story taking several dark turns, Yukimura believed that the manga would benefit by exploring arranged marriages. In contrast to the traidiion, Thorfinn marries Gudrid out of love. Once the series's fourth story arc started, Yukimura reflected on Thorfinn, telling a friend that the protagonist highlights how people can change in contrast to others, such as Thorkell, who do not want to change. While Yukimura aimed to give the manga a hopeful ending, he found it challenging to decide on Thorfinn's destiny, as the one from history suffered a tragic ending, also giving the fictional Thorfinn an apparent tragedy. Yukimura claimed he wrote the manga with the intention to see if Thorfinn managed to become a kind person.

Yukimura's take on Thorfinn's growth is different from the anime version, as the manga incorporates flashbacks, while the anime shows events in chronological order. In episode six, the staff revealed the process of how in East Anglia Thorfinn gained the ability to fight, as well as his internal feelings. The staff thought the scene showed him truly stepping into the world of battle as part of Askeladd's band, showing his transformation into a warrior. Writer Hiroshi Seko enjoyed the first fight between Thorfinn and Thorkell due to how action-packed it was.

=== Anime casting ===
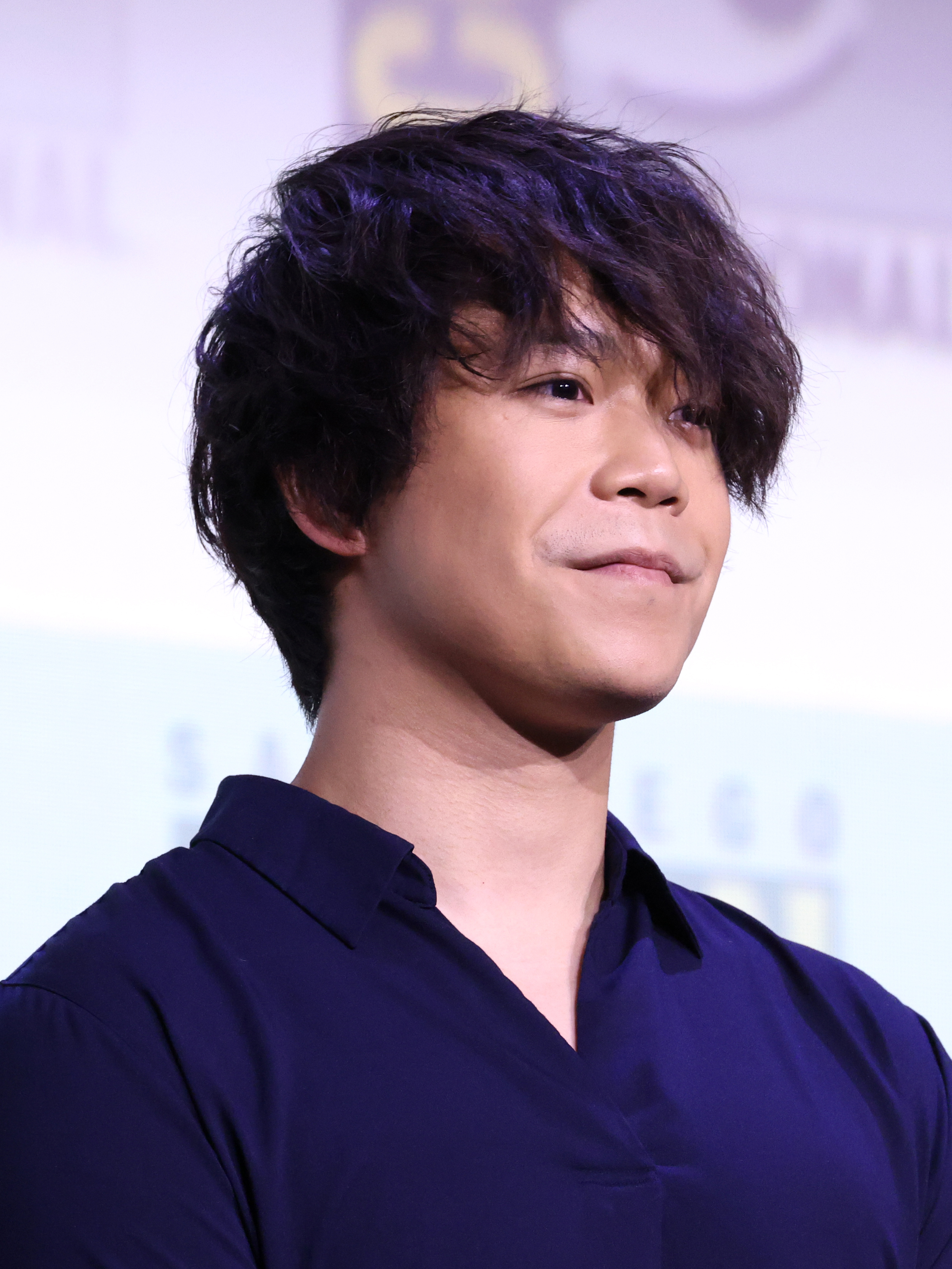
Aleks Le voices Thorfinn in the English dub from Netflix.

Japanese voice actor Yūto Uemura describes the character of Thorfinn as too violent as a result of his revenge quest. Due to Thorfinn's personality changing for the anime's second season, Uemura was conflicted with how he should sound in order to fit the protagonist. He often had discussions with the director during recordings where he insisted that Thorfinn's violent side can still be seen but wanted his portrayal to be one of a lost person. The director was pleased with the first-season Thorfinn so he was confident Uemura would properly voice him in the second season. As a result, the voice actor decided that for the second season, he would constantly show the two sides of Thorfinn's personality. In retrospect, Uemura enjoyed the fight sequences Thorfinn always had in the first season despite their brutality. He looked forward to how his character would befriend the new character of Einar, having learned that Einar would have a major impact on the protagonist. Uemura had to retake several of his interactions with Naoya Uchiha, the voice actor behind Askeladd.

Shizuka Ishigami voices Thorfinn as a child. She learned about this work when she was asked to audition. She heard that she was to play an innocent child, so when she glanced at the script, she was shocked when told of Thorfinn's violence despite his young age. After that, she became concerned about the character's changes to become Uemura's incarnation. She does not think she has seen a character with so many emotions in need of catharsis. Ishigami noted that for the television series several of the director's requests were for expressing the violence required for Thorfinn's character.

For the English dub, Mike Haimoto voices Thorfinn. He was surprised by the amount of violence. Director Kyle Jones oversaw the recordings and wanted Haimoto to fit the character. Haimoto claims he was lucky to have received this work. The actor was surprised by the fight choreography and the screams he often had to perform. The actor researched the internet to learn more about the character of Thorfinn, who he felt was too different from the rest of the characters featured in the anime. He was glad to get the role of protagonist, finding it unusual in his career. However, Haimoto noted that he would not portray all of Thorfinn's appearances as Thorfinn as a child is instead done by another actor. He was replaced by Shannon Emerick, from the Sentai Filmworks dub, to portray Thorfinn's childhood. Emerick found the work intense and emotional and enjoyed seeing the relationship between her character and Thors. When the series premiered on Netflix, a new English dub was made, where Haimoto was replaced by Aleks Le. Le was grateful for being given such an opportunity as he always wanted to voice a lead character and was a fan of Vinland Saga. Laura Stahl portrays him as a child, where she had to show several vulnerable aspects of him.

== Appearances ==
=== Vinland Saga ===
Thorfinn is introduced as a young Viking who works for Askeladd and attempts to kill him as revenge for killing his own father, Thors. As a child, Thorfinn is portrayed in flashbacks as an innocent child from Iceland who wanted to visit Vinland after listening to the adventurer Leif and who snuck onto Thors' boat, which resulted into his seeing his father's death at the hands of Askeladd's forces. Askeladd's company find employment in 1013 AD as mercenaries under the Danish King Sweyn in the Danish invasion of London, while the British are aided by Thorkell the Tall, Thorfinn's uncle, who served with Thors with the Jomsvikings. When Thorkell's forces chase after Askeladd, Thorfinn instead faces Thorkell all alone, claiming that Askeladd is his prey. After a large fight, Thorfinn defeats Thorkell earning fame as Thorfinn Karlsefni (ソルフィン・カルルセヴニ) within the soldiers but is unable to kill his own prey. Askeladd kills Sweyn during an audience, when the king announces his plan to invade Wales, feigning madness, so that Prince Canute could rule the Danish-occupied parts of England without question. An angered Thorfinn attacks the prince but is stopped by Thorkell.

A year after Askeladd's death, Thorfinn works on a farm owned by Ketil, who treats slaves well. He also befriends a slave named Einar who teaches him how to farm. With Einar's help, along with Snake, the farm's head of security, and Ketil's father Sverker, Thorfinn learns to let go of his dark past and pursues a life of peace, away from the Vikings' violence. When Thorfinn and Einar fail to save Arnheid and her husband from Ketil and Snake, Thorfinn and Einar swear to make an utopia in Vinland so that people will no longer be victims of slavery. Canute renounces his claim to attack the farm after seeing the pacifist that Thorfinn has become. With Thorfinn and Einar freed, they say their goodbyes to their friends before sailing back to Iceland with Leif, who had been searching him.

Reunited with his family, Thorfinn tells of his intent to settle in Vinland and build a new life of peace. In order to gain the funding for the trip to Vinland, Thorfinn's group plans to travel to Greece and sell Narwhal horns there. Thorfinn's crew includes new allies, the hunter Hild, whose parents were killed by Thorfinn, a young woman named Gudrid, who escaped from her fiancé and seaks to navigate, and Karli, a baby whose parents were recently killed and whom Thorfinn aims to protect. This makes Sigurd, Gudrid's fiancé, search for them. They manage to escape but are still confronted by Floki and Thorkell as the Jomsvikings remember Karlsefni's power and want him back. However, Thorfinn nearly loses his pacifism when Floki orchestrated his father's death. Thorfinn and Hild draw away the assassins, while the rest of the crew escape toward Odense. Thorfinn is temporarily made leader of the Jomsvikings and carries out orders from Canute to disband the Jomsvikings and spare Floki and Baldr from execution. Gudrid, admitting her feelings for Thorfinn, talks Thorkell out of a duel that Thorfinn promised, and they continue their journey to Greece.

Two years later, Thorfinn's crew returns to Iceland with the wealth they acquired from selling the narwhal horns. Thorfinn and Gudrid get married and raise Karli as their son. With the resources promised by Halfdan, Thorfinn begins to assemble a crew to settle in Vinland. After reaching a new land, Thorfinn makes peace with the natives and starts farming the land with his family. Four years later, it is revealed that Gudrid is pregnant with his child. Nevertheless, Thorfinn continuously faces conflict with his people, who want weapons to protect themselves. As tensions rise between the settlers and the natives and the fear of war between the two factions escalates, Thorfinn decides to abandon their desired utopia. However, Thorfinn is severely wounded by natives and war starts between two factions. Thorfinn is rescued by an elder and manages to form a truce to end the conflict. However, this costs Einar's life who is killed by one of his kind. After burying Einar, Thorfinn helps the natives to learn how to farm but is unable to convince their leader to avoid the conflict of future wars. Back in his homeland, Thorfinn reunties with his family and sees Gudrid's newborn child.

=== Other appearances ===
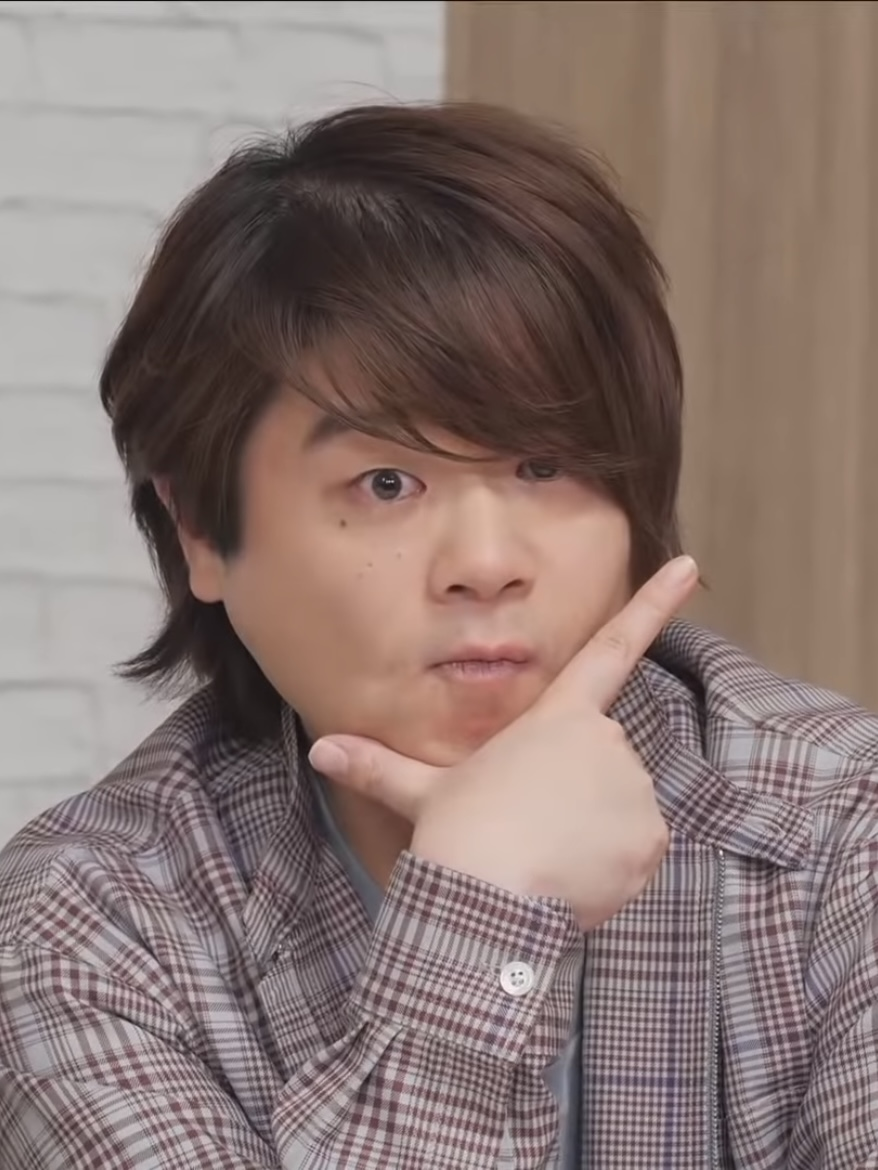
Yoshitsugu Matsuoka voices Thorfinn in Lord of Vermilion

In 2019, Thorfinn has appeared, in collaboration with Zombie Land Saga, as a chibi. He is also present in a crossover manga with Assassin's Creed Valhalla, where he meets Eivor. He was parodied in VAP's web anime Ponkotsu Quest. He is also present in a crossover with the card game Lord of Vermilion.

The anime's second season added more content about Thorfinn's sins, in the form of nightmares where his past persona commits murders; and, as soon as he enters into a house of his victims, he is replaced by his slave persona who is in shock upon seeing the murdered victims, due to the realization of his sins, which was praised by Yukimura for how well the MAPPA studio understood Thorfinn's mind.

The stage play adaptations of the manga has Shohei Hashimoto portraying Thorfinn in the first storyarc.

== Reception ==
=== Critical response ===
Early response to Thorfinn's character focused on his tragic characterization involving his father's death by both Anime News Network and Comics Worth Reading. His dysfunctional relationship with Askeladd was often criticized for turning him into a pawn as well as his failing to avenge his father over several chapters. In a more negative review, Anime UK News criticized the early characterization of Thorfinn for his dark traits, such as his moody stares or angst. Polygon compared Thorfinn to The Northman's protagonists, due to their similar quests for revenge and how both are based on historical figures. Polygon further praised the relationship between Thorfinn and Askeladd, as the former sees him as both his greatest enemy and a father figure, due to the time they spend together. Thorfinn's constant questions about his father's death were noted as the most important part of the anime series since Thorfinn is unable to leave his past behind. The Escapist Magazine said Askeladd appeared to share several parallels with Thorfinn and Canute in the anime's first season as the three of them seek revenge against their parents, and the narrative instead shows that none of them gain anything from such an act.

Following Askeladd's death, critics were surprised by Thorfinn's quieter personality and noted that, despite his life as a slave, the plot manages to make his life with other slaves interesting. The Daily Star found that Thorfinn's mundane life as a slave brings intriguing stories about "redemption and self-discovery" even if it was imperfect. According to Screen Rant, even as slaves Einar and Thorfinn are victims of violence during the second story arc as the owners threaten to kill him. Anime News Network said that, when Thorfinn's innocence is lost following Thors' death, he becomes a flat character throughout most of the first story and the second, until Einar convinces him to enjoy his life despite their sadness. Anime News Network also noted Thorfinn and Canute devoted their own values and contradicted each other when meeting in the farm. Polygon compared him to other pacifists like Shigeo Kageyama and Naruto Uzumaki; In particular, Thorfinn's new wisdom when learning about Christianity and telling Canute's army "I have no enemies" were one of the biggest highlights of the anime as a result of redefining himself rather than going back to his Viking roots. Anime News Network said that, while Thorfinn's and Eren's origin stories are similar, they differ due to the latter's pessimistic and cynical tone, which contrasts the former's desire to grow up and live atoning for his sins in regard to how they change their outlook on war. Both the Vinland Saga and Attack on Titan theme songs have lyrics involving the war in order to further link the two protagonists, with Eren ending it with his life and Thorfinn deciding to live the rest of his life atoning for it. The romantic relationship between Thorfinn and Gugrid surprised Manga News, though they still appreciated the handling of their wedding ceremony, which gave the narrative a lighter tone for a famously dark series. Manga Sanctuary agreed, finding Thorfinn to live up to his father's legacy during his quest while finding his newfound family appealing, not only including his wife Gudrid, but also his adopted son who often defends him.

There was also commentary concerning the actors' portrayals of Thorfinn. The performances of Shizuka Ishigami and Yūto Uemura were praised by Anime News Network for the amount of yells the character performs. According to voice actor Naoya Uchida (Askeladd), Uemura was quiet in the studio. He could tell that he was focusing on Thorfinn's feelings for Askeladd. Uchida believes Thorfinn's magma-like emotions accumulated and erupted, and he thinks that it was an explosive play that accumulated and erupted. Meanwhile, Akio Otsuka (Thorkell) noted that Umemura worked to carefully make his dialogue fit the lipsynch even if it was not his duty, much to his surprise. Kenichirou Matsuda (Thors) also praised Ishigami, due to the multiple types of emotions she is able to give Thorfinn regardless of his youth.

=== Analysis ===
The medievalist Maxime Danesin noted how the European Middle Ages are seen through the prism of modern Japanese literature, how the lack of proper knowledge about the real life of Thorfinn in The Greenlanders and Eric the Red allowed Yukimura to create a more original character, and how the main character's becoming a Viking during his youth gives him a realistic characterization. According to the writer, while Thorfinn is originally driven by revenge, the manga also explores his desire to have power similar to "those who desperately struggle to find their homelands in the 21st century 'medieval' Japan". According to Ashley D. Lake from University of California, Riverside, Thorkell, Thorfinn, and Askeladd are described as war veterans who seek Thors' answer to what makes them true warriors. However, due to Thors' death and Thorfinn never being properly raised by his father, the three characters never understood his ideal.

In "Beyond Time & Culture: The Revitalisation of Old Norse Literature and History in Yukimura Makoto's Vinland Saga", Thorfinn is seen as an alternate take of the real Thorfinn based on Yukimura's research who attempts to avoid portraying far from a stereotype of Vikings in Vinland Saga; Thorfinn was chosen as the protagonist due to the real's lack of fame, resulting into multiple liberies the manga author takes while writing the series with his reasoning to travel to Vinland not being due to an attempt to colonize the lands but instead create an utopia free slavery. For this the character rejects his violent ways learned in his life as Viking and express the desire to become a kind figure as explored when he confronts Canute during the farm he was slaved during the manga's second story arc. K. Garcia says that Thorfinn's character arc in the manga serves as the model of positive masculinity that rejects patriarchy through a series of multiple scenes where the protagonist faces selfrefreshion in order to become more mature. Meanwhile, in the book "Viking and old norse memoryscapes in comics", Thorfinn is seenas in individual stressed from his desire of revenge but manages to move from his life as Viking.

In "Campeones Solitarios en la Viñeta Japonesa", multiple writers compared Thorfinn with other protagonists from the seinen manga demographic, with Guts from Berserk and Miyamoto Musashi from Vagabond as the three leading characters who had their childhood defined by violence, and how across maturity, the three seek a way to reject violence and obtain healthier lives. Both Thorfinn and Guts are initially written in notable antagonistic fashion to the readers themselves, embodying the concept of a harsh masculinity born from rage. Both Thorfinn and Guts are victimized after tragic stories with the former becoming a slave. A major part of each protagonist's growth is obtaining a more mature morality which is common in Japanese culture and thus seek redemption with Thorfinn seeking redemption through his desire to turn Vinland into an utopia where slavery does not exist.

=== Popularity ===
Manga author Hajime Isayama said that Thorfinn is his favorite character from Vinland Saga due to his humanity and guilt. Yukimura was interested in Thorfin's life as a slave, but he wondered if he could understand Thorfinn more from Einar's point of view. He was initially confused about whether or not Thorfinn's true nature would return when meeting Canute. Eventually, Isayama felt that the slave arc allowed Thorfinn to define himself as a character and become more likable, due to how he accepts having committed too many sins and wants to redeem himself. However, Isayama specifically points to how Thorfinn becomes more human the more he destroys. In response, Yukimura was worried about how readers would perceive him since he changes as the narrative goes along. Isayama further praised Thorfinn's suffering and redemption in later chapters of the manga, claiming he was moved by it.

In 2023, Yukimura recalled receiving several negative responses from fans after the ending of the first story arc, as Thorfinn is no longer portrayed as a Viking and instead spends his time farming. The author apologized to the readers for such a change, but he still finds it impossible to return the series to its violent topics. Instead, Yukimura told the fanbase to consider the manga Attack on Titan for its focus on violence. Following the ending of the second story arc of the series, Yukimura was surprised by the sudden rise of popularity of Thorfinn, especially within Western fans, when the protagonist tells Canute's army "I have no enemies". The same scene also went viral and was subject common posts by fans. Yukimura claimed he was really happy to hear the quote was so loved outside Japan. He expressed how he applies this phrase to calm his nerves whenever he has to speak in front of many people. In Yukimura's eyes, he has no enemies, everyone is his friend, so talking to big audiences becomes easier for him. James Beckett from Anime News Network listed Thorfinn as the best character from 2023 due to his large character arc carried in the two seasons of the anime adaptation of the series praising how much more human the former Viking becomes years after working as a slave. In another article, Beckett listed the scene where Thorfinn confronts Canute's soldiers as the best one from 2023 due to how he finally understood his father's lesson about what was being a warrior.

At the 4th Crunchyroll Anime Awards in 2020, Thorfinn's fight against Thorkell was nominated for "Best Fight Scene" but lost to Tanjiro and Nezuko's fight against Rui from Demon Slayer: Kimetsu no Yaiba. The fights between Thorfinn and Thorkell were found by Comics Worth Reading to be ridiculously superheroic, as a result of the character's movements, with DualShockers listing both as among those from the first season. Writer Hiroshi Seko believes Thorfinn's age and role in a story of Vikings to be one of the best reasons for the series' popularity. The character was also ranked in the Anitrendz poll. He was nominated for "Best Main Character" at the 8th Crunchyroll Anime Awards in 2024.
