= Yūto Uemura =

Japanese actor (born 1993)

- 上村 祐翔
- Born: October 23, 1993 (age 33); Saitama Prefecture, Japan
- Education: Chuo University
- Occupations: Actor; voice actor; singer
- Years active: 1999–present
- Agent: Himawari Theatre Group
- Notable work: Bungo Stray Dogs as Atsushi Nakajima; Vinland Saga as Thorfinn; Nanbaka as Jyugo; Darling in the Franxx as Hiro; My Hero Academia as Tamaki Amajiki
- Height: 173 cm (5 ft 8 in)
- Website: https://profile.himawari.net/view/1542

Yūto Uemura (上村 祐翔, Uemura Yūto; born October 23, 1993) is a Japanese actor, voice actor and singer. He is affiliated with Himawari Theatre Group.

== Personal life ==
On March 16, 2024, Yūto announced that he had gotten married.

== Filmography ==
=== Television drama ===
- Bakuryū Sentai Abaranger (2003), Lad
- Tokusou Sentai Dekaranger (2004), Hikaru Hiwatari
- Fūrin Kazan (2007), Yokichi Kuzurasa
- Maō (2008), Hitoshi Kasai (young)
- Karyū no Utage (2011), Takuya Honda

=== Original home video ===
- Tokusou Sentai Dekaranger: 10 Years After (2015), Hikaru Hiwatari

=== Anime television series ===
2002

- Cyborg 009 - Aro, Black Ghost (child)

2004

- Zipang - Yousuke (child)

2005

- Monster - Johan (young)

2008

- Michiko & Hatchin - Massan

2013

- Gatchaman Crowds - Sanada

2014

- Kamigami no Asobi - Tsukito Totsuka
- Mushishi: Next Passage - Rokusuke

2016

- Aikatsu Stars! - Nozomu Igarashi
- B-Project: Kodou*Ambitious - Kazuna Masunaga
- Bungo Stray Dogs - Atsushi Nakajima
- Nanbaka - Jyugo

2017

- ACCA: 13-Territory Inspection Dept. - Magi
- The Ancient Magus' Bride - Matthew

2018

- Boruto: Naruto Next Generations - Shinki
- Captain Tsubasa - Shun Nitta
- Darling in the Franxx - Hiro
- My Hero Academia 3 - Tamaki Amajiki / Suneater
- Run with the Wind - Jirō Jō
- Sirius the Jaeger - Yuliy
- Tsurune - Minato Narumiya
- Violet Evergarden - Leon Stephanotis

2019

- Ahiru no Sora - Yozan Kamiki
- B-Project: Zecchō Emotion - Kazuna Masunaga
- Bungo Stray Dogs 3 - Atsushi Nakajima
- My Hero Academia 4 - Tamaki Amajiki
- Hoshiai no Sora - Itsuse twins
- Vinland Saga - Thorfinn

2020

- Drifting Dragons - Soraya
- Haikyuu!!: To The Top - Motoya Komori
- I'm Standing on a Million Lives - Yūsuke Yotsuya
- Listeners - Ritchie
- Moriarty the Patriot - Fred Porlock

2021

- 86 - Kiriya Nouzen
- Amaim Warrior at the Borderline - Gashin Tezuka
- Build Divide -#00000 (Code Black)- - Teruhito Kurabe
- Bungo Stray Dogs Wan! - Atsushi Nakajima
- Cestvs: The Roman Fighter - Nero
- I'm Standing on a Million Lives 2nd Season - Yūsuke Yotsuya
- Kingdom - Haku Rei
- My Hero Academia 5 - Tamaki Amajiki
- Re-Main - Minato Kiyomizu

2022

- Build Divide -#00000 (Code White)- - Teruhito Kurabe
- My Hero Academia 6 - Tamaki Amajiki
- Shadowverse Flame - Light Tenryū
- Shine On! Bakumatsu Bad Boys! - Suzuran

2023

- Ayaka: A Story of Bonds and Wounds - Yukito Yanagi
- Bungo Stray Dogs 4 - Sakunosuke Oda (young), Atsushi Nakajima
- Sugar Apple Fairy Tale - Keith Powell
- Tsurune: The Linking Shot - Minato Narumiya
- Vinland Saga Season 2 - Thorfinn

2024

- Blue Miburo - Ayame
- Kinokoinu: Mushroom Pup - Hotaru Yūyami
- My Hero Academia 7 - Tamaki Amajiki
- Tasūketsu - Saneatsu Narita

2025

- Anyway, I'm Falling in Love with You - Ryōsuke Saitō
- My Hero Academia: Final Season - Tamaki Amajiki
- New Panty & Stocking with Garterbelt - Polyurethane
- Private Tutor to the Duke's Daughter - Allen

2026

- Dark Moon: The Blood Altar - Jukah
- The Case Book of Arne - Heinz
- The Classroom of a Black Cat and a Witch - Castor Gemini
- Haibara's Teenage New Game+ - Natsuki Haibara
- Rich Girl Caretaker - Itsuki Tomonari
- Hell Teacher: Jigoku Sensei Nube - Hiroshi Tateno (adult)
- The World's Strongest Witch - Reinhardt Highwind

2027

- Reincarnation in the Game World Dan-Katsu - Zephyrus
- The Greatest Magicmaster's Retirement Plan - Alus Reigin

TBA

- Kusunoki's Flunking Her High School Glow-Up - Keisuke Shizuki

=== Original video animation/Original net animation ===
- Assassination Classroom (2013), Yuma Isogai
- Sword Gai (2018) - Gai Ogata
- Rising Impact (2024) - Liebel Ringvald
- Babies of Bread (2024) - Bun Baby 3
- Moonrise (2025) - Phil Ash

=== Anime films ===
- Bonobono: Kumomo no Ki no Koto (2002), Bonobono
- Bungo Stray Dogs: Dead Apple (2018), Atsushi Nakajima
- Her Blue Sky (2019), Bamba
- Knights of Sidonia: Love Woven in the Stars (2021), Kairi Hamagata
- My Hero Academia: World Heroes' Mission (2021), Tamaki Amajiki
- Legend of the Galactic Heroes: The New Thesis - Clash (2022), Niedhart Müller
- Tsurune: The Movie – The First Shot (2022), Minato Narumiya
- Yamato yo Towa ni: Rebel 3199 (2024), Takeshi Ageha

=== Video games ===
- Kamigami no Asobi (2013), Tsukito Totsuka
- Kamigami no Asobi InFinite (2015), Tsukito Totsuka
- Yumeiro Cast (2015), Hinata Sakuragi
- Yume100 (2015), Kanoto
- Kingdom Hearts χ (2016), Ephemer
- Kingdom Hearts χ Back Cover (2017), Ephemer
- Super Bomberman R (2018), Plasma Bomber
- Kingdom Hearts III (2019), Ephemer
- Tokyo Chronos (2019), Kyosuke Sakurai
- Namu Amida Butsu! -UTENA- (2019), Kongōyasha Myōō, Suiten
- My Hero: One's Justice 2 (2020), Tamaki Amajiki
- Olympia Soiree (2021), Shiro Tokisada Amakusa
- Touken Ranbu (2021), Hanjin
- Angelique Luminarise (2021), Felix
- Samurai Warriors 5 (2021), Hashiba Hideyoshi
- The Caligula Effect 2 (2021), Kobato Kazamatsuri
- Tales of Luminaria (2021), Lucien Dufaure
- Detective Pikachu Returns (2023), Tim Goodman

=== Dubbing ===
==== Live-action ====
- Attack the Block, Dennis (Franz Drameh)
- The Gifted, Andy Strucker (Percy Hynes White)
- iBoy, Tom Harvey (Bill Milner)
- Interstellar, Young Tom Cooper (Timothée Chalamet)
- Jurassic World (2017 NTV edition), Zach Mitchell (Nick Robinson)
- Joker: Folie à Deux, Ricky Meline (Jacob Lofland)
- Kraven the Hunter, young Dmitri Smerdyakov (Billy Barratt)

==== Animation ====
- Hamster & Gretel, Kevin Grant-Gomez
