= Makoto Yukimura =

Japanese manga artist

- 幸村 誠
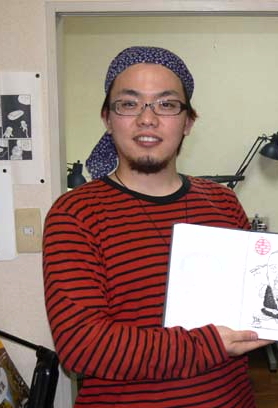
- Yukimura in 2006
- Born: May 8, 1976 (age 50); Yokohama, Kanagawa, Japan
- Occupation: Manga artist
- Known for: Planetes; Vinland Saga

Makoto Yukimura (Japanese: 幸村 誠, Hepburn: Yukimura Makoto; born May 8, 1976) is a Japanese manga artist best known for his manga Planetes and Vinland Saga.

== Biography ==
=== Early life ===
Yukimura considered himself a laidback child at school. The first manga he read was Akira Toriyama's Dr. Slump at 5; he was particularly impressed by its cover. He then watched the anime much to his surprise because he did not see the need of a story being repeated. When Yukimura became 16, he had the idea of becoming a manga author. During his early life, Yukimura was nearly killed in two car accidents. This made him reconsider his way of thinking. He believes he had no social life and barely paid attention to classes in his childhood. The only thing he wrote in his notebook was manga. He graduated from Chuo University and Suginami High School. In contrast to other students, Yukimura faced no hardships in graduating and recalls having brief anxiety. Yukimura's crisis with school and lack of interest with his growth and jobs worried his parents. However, Yukimura's school life changed when being taught by a literature teacher who used Michael Ende's famous work The Never Ending Story in a class.

Yukimura was first inspired to become a manga artist after reading Fist of the North Star as a boy. He said he had always wanted to produce a series which reflected the same themes of "strength and justice". However, he felt that he would not accomplish his dream due to poor academic skills. Eventually, he started studying manga at 16 and was recruited as an assistant two years later. His parents convinced him of graduating first from high school. He never drew manga on his own until his debut. Once graduating from college at 22, he met Kaiji Kawaguchi who found his potential to become a manga author. He met Dai Morimura who taught him about drawing manga and find his own style rather than imitating others. Yukimura got married during his work as an assistant who supported him. In regards to his family, Yukimura mentioned he has two children with the first one being born in 2006 and the second one in 2008. With the later birth of another child, Yukimura revealed that all were male but was worried about their health.

=== Career ===
Yukimura made his debut with the hard science fiction manga Planetes, serialized in Weekly Morning magazine from 1999 to 2004 and adapted into a 26-episode anime series by Sunrise. Before that, he worked as an assistant for Shin Morimura.

He is the author of Vinland Saga which was first serialized in Weekly Shōnen Magazine, then moved to the Monthly Afternoon magazine due to releases pacing issues. He was inspired by the anime series Vicky the Viking he watched as a child, and since then he has been fascinated with Vikings. For this work he received the 2009 Japan Media Arts Festival Grand Prize in the manga category. In 2010, he was a guest of the Angoulême International Comics Festival. As of July 2021, the manga had over 5.5 million copies in circulation. While the series is notable for its amount of violence normally caused by Vikings, Yukimura claimed he hates the concept of violence. As a result, a key element in writing this story was relaxing his modern sense of morality.

Vinland Saga was also adapted into an anime series by Wit Studio in 2019. MAPPA animated its second season starting in January 2023. Yukimura praised the Vinland Saga anime for solving the manga's pacing issues and adding new content.

In August 2022, Yukimura did a crossover manga with the video game Assassin's Creed Valhalla where 'Vinland Saga protagonist Thorfinn meets Valhalla lead Eivor.

In July 2023, Yukimura made his first U.S. convention appearance at San Diego Comic-Con.

== Commentary ==
Yukimura drew inspiration from his own experience and understanding of the Cold War and the September 11 attacks for Thorfinn's character who is traumatized by his actions as a viking and thus decides to find Vinland in order to build a place for people from different races to live together peacefully.

Yukimura pays attention to drawing hands as he claims they the most expressive part of a character after the face, giving a brief explanation of the person's personality. This was influenced by manga author Katsuhiro Otomo. During the COVID-19 pandemic, Yukimura started drawing the chapters of Vinland Saga digitally.

When he first started drawing Vinland Saga, Yukimura expected the series to take 10 years. He had calculated that there would be 20 volumes, comprising 4 parts of 5 volumes each. From the beginning of the serialization, he felt at a loss with the increasing scope of the work, wondering when he could complete the actual arc of Vinland. Due to these struggles, Yukimura has said that he looks up to Hajime Isayama for his work on Attack on Titan due to how he was able to handle the entire plot until the end, especially from its 20th volume onward. In response, Isayama said he admires Yukimura for his detailed art and foreshadowing, remarking that the breaks are necessary to create such consistently high-quality work.

Another series Yukimura became a fan while writing is My Dress-Up Darling. Among other preferred works, Yukimura enjoys horror stories, most notably Junji Ito's, Nokuto Koike's, and Motosuke Takaminato. Anji Matono's recent work from 2022 also attracts him.

== Works ==
- Planetes (1999–2004, serialized in Weekly Morning, Kodansha)
- For Our Farewell is Near (さようならが近いので, Sayōnara ga Chikai node) (2004, one-shot published in Evening, Kodansha)
- Vinland Saga (2005–2025, serialized in Weekly Shōnen Magazine from April to October 2005, then in Monthly Afternoon from December 2005 to July 2025, Kodansha)
