= Charles K. Johnson =

American conspiracy theorist (1924–2001)

Charles Kenneth Johnson (July 24, 1924 – March 19, 2001) was, from 1972 until his death, the president of the International Flat Earth Research Society, which he and his wife ran from their home in California. He claimed that the Apollo Moon landings, and space exploration in general, were faked to lead people away from the biblical truth that the world was flat.

== Biography ==
Charles Kenneth Johnson was born on a farm near San Angelo, Texas on July 24, 1924, and grew up in San Angelo. He was raised as a member of the Church of the Nazarene, but broke with the denomination as an adult. According to Johnson, he had doubted the round Earth theory since an elementary school teacher tried, unsuccessfully, to teach him about gravity. To prove the existence of gravity, Johnson's teacher had him swing around a bucket full of water, which stayed in the bucket as a result of centrifugal force, but Johnson found the experiment irrelevant as to the shape of the Earth and therefore unconvincing.

After reading about him in an article in Harper's Magazine in 1944, he wrote to Wilbur Glenn Voliva, the de facto leader of the flat earth movement in the United States, and received an enthusiastic reply from Voliva.

During and after World War II, Johnson worked as an airplane mechanic in Arizona, Los Angeles, and San Francisco, remaining true to his flat earth beliefs. In 1959, Johnson met the Australian Marjory Waugh in a San Francisco record store while both looking for an Acker Bilk record, and after Johnson discovered Marjory was also a believer in the flat earth the two fell in love and married in 1962. Johnson began a correspondence with Samuel Shenton, who led the International Flat Earth Society in the United Kingdom in the late 1960s, and applied for membership in Shenton's organization.

Johnson sought to take over the Society from Shenton on the latter's death in 1972, despite Shenton having picked Ellis Hillman as his successor. Because of Hillman's belief in a spherical earth, Johnson managed to convince Shelton's wife to transfer a part of his papers to the United States, and Johnson officially founded the International Flat Earth Research Society of America and Covenant People’s Church in 1972.

He ran the organization from his ranch near Edwards Air Force Base, where he lived together with his wife. While president, his organization had only around 200 members in 1980. Johnson once said that "if earth were a ball spinning in space, there would be no up or down."

== Beliefs ==
Johnson belief system consisted of a mixture of right-wing Christian fundamentalism, criticism of the military-industrial complex, Zetetic flat earth philosophy in the tradition of figures such as Samuel Rowbotham, apocalypticism and New Age millenarianism.

In line with Rowbotham and other flat earth theorists, Johnson believed the earth to be a flat, stationary plane centered on the North Pole and surrounded by an ice wall, roughly 150 meters tall. The Earth was the center of the universe, 3,000 miles above which the Sun and Moon, both around 32 miles in diameter, revolved, and which were encased by a heavenly dome roughly 1,000 miles above that. While Johnson was a fundamentalist Christian who described science and the theory of evolution as "satanic", he emphasized the flat earth's supposed scientific basis grounded in common sense and observation instead of "imaginary" theories, and described his beliefs as "Flat Earth Science". Despite their shared ideological basis and opposition to evolution, Johnson despised figures such as Henry M. Morris and his Institute for Creation Research, who he attacked as lackeys of "Satanic Grease Ball Science" due to their support for a spherical earth.

Johnson also supported a variety of pseudohistorical arguments. He inverted the common myth that Christopher Columbus had discovered the Earth to be round, arguing instead that he had discovered the Earth was flat but hidden this from the public to curry favor with "the scientists and priests in control." The spherical earth was further boosted by Protestant figures such as Martin Luther and Henry VIII, who caused Christianity as a whole to become "in league with science", and the Scientific Revolution including Copernicus, nicknamed "Co-pernicious" by Johnson, whose heliocentric writings had directly led to the release of Satan upon the world.

In modern times, according to Johnson, the "myth" of spherical earth was spread by world governments, whose leaders are all secret believers in the flat earth, in order to keep the population in check, and had invented the space program as a jobs program for "otherwise unemployable Kennedy Democrats". Following World War II, the victorious Allies had planned to create a one-world government headed by Franklin Delano Roosevelt which would reveal the supposed truth of the Earth's shape, which they hinted at by adopting a flat earth map as part of the emblem of the United Nations. This was halted following Roosevelt's death, but Johnson maintained that the plan would be fulfilled within his lifetime.

In addition, Johnson was also a vegetarian and an anti-vivisectionist, frequently hosting advertisements for organizations such as People for the Ethical Treatment of Animals in his magazine.

== Later life ==
In 1995, Johnson's ranch burned down, and while he personally managed to rescue his wife Marjory and his pets, their possessions as well as many of the Society's documents were destroyed. Following the death of his wife in 1996, he moved in with a brother in Lancaster, California. Charles Kenneth Johnson died on March 19, 2001.

In his obituary, Tim Bullamore wrote, "Although the world at large was slow to accept his work, Johnson remained cheerful and unruffled. He enjoyed smoking a cigar while watching the sun set over the flat desert. He was regularly interviewed by curious journalists and was often invited to speak about his subject. He received large quantities of mail, not all of it ridiculing his work, and on one occasion he starred in an ice-cream advertisement."

== See also ==
- Modern flat Earth beliefs

== Bibliography ==
- Garwood, Christine (2007). Flat Earth: The History of an Infamous Idea. Macmillan. ISBN 978-0-330-43289-4.
- Schadewald, Bob; Schadewald, Wendy S. (2015). The Plane Truth.
