= Samuel Shenton =

Flat earth proponent

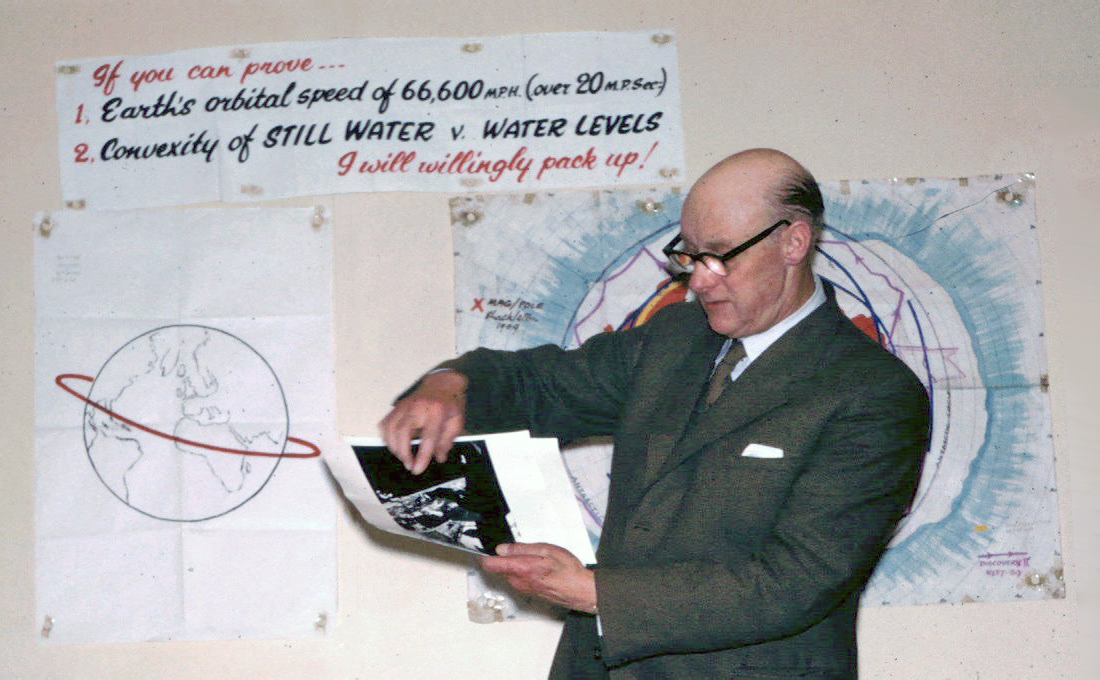
- Samuel Shenton lecturing at the Science Fiction Society, UCL, in 1966.
- Born: 30 March 1903; Great Yarmouth, Norfolk, England
- Died: 2 March 1971 (aged 67); Dover, Kent, England
- Occupations: Signwriter, lecturer
- Known for: Founding of the Flat Earth Society

Samuel Shenton (30 March 1903 – 2 March 1971) was an English conspiracy theorist and lecturer. In 1956, he founded the International Flat Earth Research Society, based in Dover. He lectured tirelessly on this to youth clubs, political and student groups, and during the Space Race in the 1960s he was frequently seen on television and in newspapers promoting his views.

== Life ==
Samuel Shenton was a sign writer, who lived with his wife Lillian in a ginger-brick terrace in suburban Dover. He was the son of an army sergeant major, born in Great Yarmouth, and by the 1920s claimed to have invented an airship that would rise into the atmosphere and remain stationary until the Earth spun westwards at 1,000 km/h (620 mph) to the desired destination at the same latitude. Shenton could not understand why someone had not previously thought of this idea until he discovered, in the reading room of the British Museum at Bloomsbury that Archbishop Stevens, a friend of Lady Blount, the founder of the Universal Zetetic Society, had suggested an aircraft design similar to his own. When he discovered Parallax's Zetetic Astronomy he was an instant convert. "What the authorities were concealing, was the 'fact' that the earth was flat".

Shenton soon constructed a cosmology, based partly on his interpretation of Genesis, that Earth was a flat disk centred on the North Pole with the zetetic notion of the South Pole being an impenetrable wall of ice, that marked the edge of the pit that is the Earth in the endless flat plane forming the universe. The Sun cast a narrow beam like a flashlight moving over a table as it traced flat circles that varied over the 365-day cycles. The Sun was 32 miles (51 km) in diameter 3,000 miles (4,800 km) above the Earth and the Moon also 32 miles in diameter but only 2,550 miles (4,100 km) above the earth.

In 1956 he founded the Flat Earth Society as a direct descendant of the Universal Zetetic Society but with a less religious emphasis, found a president in William Mills, a relative of one of Lady Blount's followers, and held its inaugural meeting in November at Mills' home in London, with Shenton as secretary. One of the attendees, attending out of curiosity, was the Sky at Night astronomer Patrick Moore who recounted his experience in his book Can you speak Venusian?. Shenton claimed that George Bernard Shaw attended one meeting, declaring the presentation was "very persuasive". Despite his contrary ideas, Shenton was elected a fellow of both the Royal Astronomical and Royal Geographical Societies.

Despite the launch in October 1957 of Sputnik, the world's first artificial satellite, Shenton proved a popular speaker to small groups, enjoying particularly talking to children, never declining an invitation. He claimed that satellites simply circled over a flat disc-world: "Would sailing round the Isle of Wight prove that it were spherical?", he demanded. As crewed space flight started in 1961, Shenton began to attract international media attention with his denials, telling the Coshocton Tribune on 10 May that the astronauts could never travel into orbit.

When John Glenn orbited the world, he was sent an IFERS membership with the message "Ok Wise Guy" added to it. Shenton continued to lecture largely at his own expense but he suffered two strokes in 1963. In January 1964 the New York Times carried a piece about the IFERS. During a parliamentary debate, Enoch Powell likened his opponents to "flat-earthers" and Harold Wilson reportedly slung back the insult in turn. Shenton was outraged and wrote letters of complaint.

The Gemini 4 mission marked a change of pace for his campaign and he was to receive letters from across the world for the next few years. In 1966 he produced a pamphlet, The Plane Truth, which included a circular informing members "that modern astronomy and space flight were insults to God and divine punishment for humankind's arrogance was a mere matter of time". But the Lunar Orbiter program led to a sharp decline in membership. "Visual images, whether they were globes, photographs or television pictures, were clearly critical to how people perceived the earth's shape ... and pre-school children could know that it was round even if they had no grasp of the words 'mathematics', 'geography', 'astronomy' and 'science'".

In December 1968, during the Apollo 8 mission, Shenton admitted, "If they show us a very clear picture of the earth from space and the picture does not show all the continents, and the edge of the picture is out of perspective, then that would prove that the earth is round. Until then, we shall continue fighting to prove the earth is flat." A month later Shenton asserted deception and conspiracy. Asked about Apollo 8 sending images of a round Earth, he said, "That's where those Americans and Russians are so damned cunning. For some reason or other they obviously want us to think the world is round. Some of the pictures have been blatantly doctored. Studio shots, probably." Following Apollo 11, he added, "The astronauts are hypnotized into believing they go into space. Even with their training, those chaps wouldn't have the nerve to be fired off on top of an explosive, a rocket, and the lack of observations they bring back is negligible."

By 1968, his health had deteriorated further and his signwriting business had collapsed although the media attention continued. But he stuck to his principles of 'zetetic enquiry' in which only personally acquired facts were permissible. In January 1969, IFERS had dropped to 100 members worldwide. But as his organization was dying, he found the successor he had been looking for: Ellis Hillman, a lecturer and member of the Greater London Council, agreed to be president of the IFERS, with the encouragement of Patrick Moore. Lillian Shenton was suspicious of his motives (he was developing a post-graduate course on the development of ideas about the shape of the earth) and in the event he did little for the society. Eighteen months later, Shenton had died.

== See also ==
- Figure of the Earth
- Geodesy
- Hollow Earth
- Lady Elizabeth Blount
- Mark Sargent
- Modern flat Earth beliefs
- Samuel Rowbotham
- Spherical Earth § Effects and empirical confirmation (documenting why the flat Earth belief is mistaken)
- Wilbur Glenn Voliva

== Bibliography ==
- Garwood, Christine (2007). Flat Earth, the history of an infamous idea. London, Macmillan. ISBN 9780312382087.
