= Henry Yule Oldham =

British academic (1862–1951)

Henry Yule Oldham (14 December 1862 – 14 March 1951) was a teacher and geographer who, in 1901, conducted the definitive version of the Bedford Level experiment, a proof that the Earth is a sphere.

== Early life ==
Oldham was born in Düsseldorf, Kingdom of Prussia, the younger son of Thomas Oldham, the director of the Geological Survey of India. He was educated at Rugby and Jesus College, Oxford, matriculating at Jesus College as a commoner in 1882. Whilst at Oxford, he rowed in the college boat and was president of the Debating Society. He graduated in 1886 with a second class honours degree in Animal Morphology.

== Career ==
On graduating from Oxford, Oldham took a post as a private tutor in France. This he followed with post-graduate studies at Paris University (1886-7), before becoming in turn an assistant master at Hulme Grammar School and then at Harrow School. After further post-graduate studies at Berlin University (1891–92) he became a lecturer in Geography at Owens College, Manchester. In 1893 he took up a post at King's College, Cambridge, where he was to remain for twenty-eight years.

== The Bedford Level experiment ==
In 1838 Samuel Rowbotham of the Universal Zetetic Society had claimed to demonstrate that a six-mile length of the Old Bedford River, Cambridgeshire, had a flat surface and not, as would be expected if the earth were a sphere, a curved one. In 1870 on the same spot the noted explorer Alfred Russel Wallace, a trained surveyor, soundly disproved the observation, but the mystery was not allowed to rest and Rowbotham's supporters continued to argue their case with great vigour in the courts, in scientific journals and in pamphlets. In 1901 Oldham used a plate camera and theodolite for his careful observations along the length of the river and he presented his results at an illustrated lecture held at the British Association for the Advancement of Science. His experiment, because of its photographic proof, is regarded as definitive and was taught in schools until images taken from orbiting satellites became available.

== Selected works ==
- Geography, Aims and Practice of Teaching
- Discovery of the Cape Verde Islands Royal Geographical Society (1892)
- A Pre-Columban Discovery Of America Royal Geographical Society (1894)
- Was America Discovered Before Columbus? Geographical Journal 5 221-339 (1898)
- The Experimental Demonstration of the Curvature of the Earth's Surface, as Recorded by Photography. Year Book of the Royal Society of London (1904)

== Honours and awards ==
- Fellow of the Royal Geographical Society

== Notes and references ==
- Who Was Who: Oldham, Henry Yule (2007). London, A & C Black
