= Elizabeth, Lady Blount =

English flat-earth advocate (1850–1935)

Elizabeth Blount
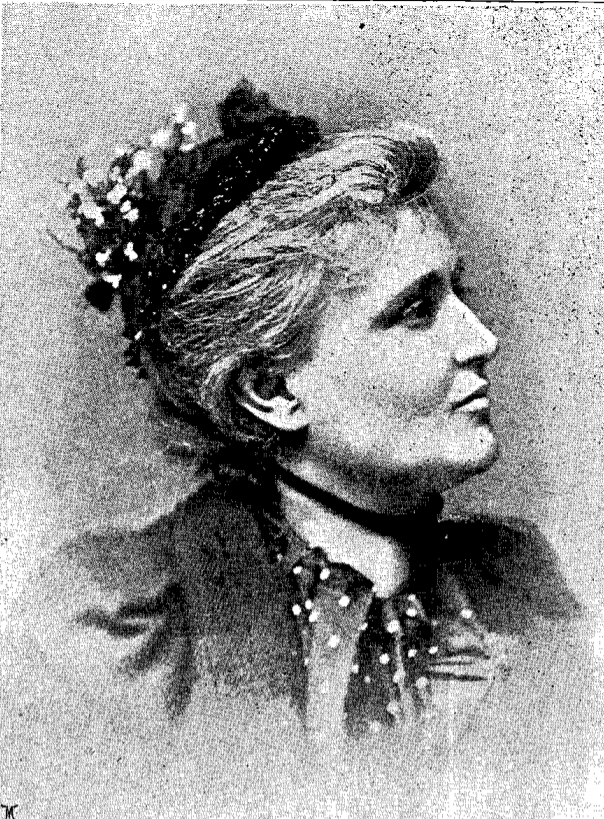
- from her 1898 novel
- Born: Elizabeth Anne Mould Williams; 7 May 1850; Lambeth
- Died: 2 January 1935 (aged 84); Hayling Island
- Known for: advocate for a flat earth
- Predecessor: Samuel Rowbotham
- Spouses: Sir Walter de Sodington Blount, 9th Baronet (m. 1873; died 1915) Stephen Morgan (m. 1928)
- Children: 4
- Parent(s): James Williams; Elizabeth Mould

Elizabeth Anne Mould, Lady Blount (born Elizabeth Anne Mould Williams lastly Elizabeth Anne Mould Morgan; 7 May 1850 – 2 January 1935) was an English pamphlet writer and flat earth activist. She was president of the Universal Zetetic Society, which promoted belief in a flat Earth, and conducted experiments that sought to prove this.

== Early life ==
Blount was born in Lambeth in 1850. Her parents were Elizabeth Ann (born Mould) and James Zacharias Williams, who was a keen supporter of London clubs and a pious Protestant. She was tutored at home, and developed wide interests in art, science, social responsibility, and London's society and intelligentsia. Influenced by her parents' religious views, Blount became convinced of Biblical literalism.

She married Sir Walter de Sodington Blount, 9th Baronet, a Roman Catholic aristocrat who was disowned by his family for marrying a Protestant, and they raised a family in the suburbs of London, where she was a fellow of the Royal Society of Literature and the Society of Antiquaries.

== Flat Earth advocacy ==
Blount's first documented interest in the flat earth occurred in 1892, when a series of letters by her were published in a Seventh-day Adventist newspaper. In the next few years, she would frequently contribute letters and poems to the Earth Review, a publication founded by Samuel Rowbotham.

After Rowbotham's death in 1884, Blount founded the Universal Zetetic Society (UZS) in 1893, whose objective was "the propagation of knowledge related to Natural Cosmogony in confirmation of the Holy Scriptures, based on practical scientific investigation," and eventually became its president. Her flat-earth beliefs were a direct result of her support for a literalist interpretation of the Bible, a justification which she also used to criticise Darwin's theory of evolution. Blount's title and money was said to have attracted an Anglican archbishop, several colonels, and a Major-General to the membership. Other notable members included Ethelbert William Bullinger and Edward Haughton, a moderator at Trinity College Dublin. The society published a magazine, The Earth Not a Globe Review, and remained active well into the early 20th century. A flat Earth journal, Earth: A Monthly Magazine of Sense and Science, was published between 1901 and 1904, edited by Lady Blount.

In 1898 she published a novel titled Adrian Galilio, or a Song Writer's Story. The novel was intended to popularise Blount's cosmology to a wider audience, and its plot detailed the life of Lady Alma, a Protestant noblewoman who escapes her unhappy marriage to a Catholic man, has an affair with a Catholic priest, and becomes a travelling flat-earth lecturer under the pseudonym "Madame Bianka". In the early 1900s, Lady Blount had moved to South Wimbledon, where she lived in a separate house next door to her husband.

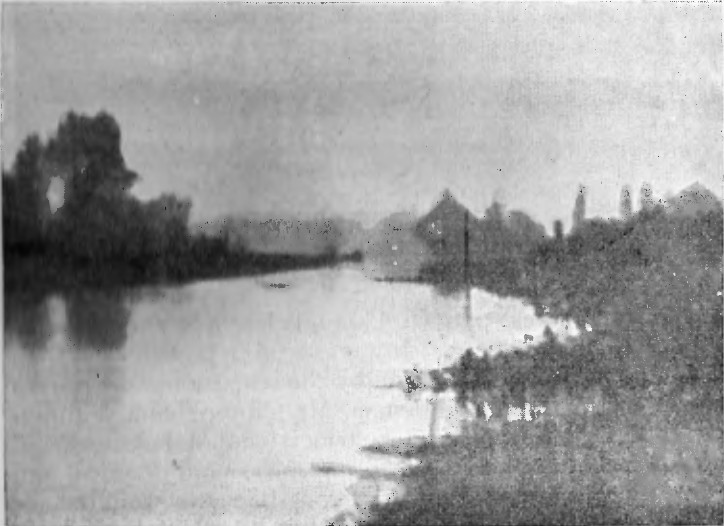
Picture of the Bedford Level: "Carried out in misty and very unsatisfactory weather, on May 11th, 1904, before Lady Blount and several scientific gentlemen."

Blount and her husband wanted to provide evidence of the earth's flat surface and they conducted experiments on the Old Bedford Level Canal over several weeks. On 11 May 1904, Lady Blount hired a photographer to use a telephoto-lens camera to take a picture from Welney of a large white sheet, which she had placed the bottom edge near the surface of the river at Rowbotham's original position 6 miles (9.7 km) away. The photographer, Edgar Clifton from Dallmeyer's studio, mounted his camera 2 feet (0.61 m) above the water at Welney and was surprised to be able to obtain a picture of the target, which he believed should have been invisible to him, given the low mounting point of the camera. Lady Blount published the pictures far and wide. Blount's letter did not discuss the effects of atmospheric refraction but the photographer noted a mirage which he described as "an aqueous shimmering vapour [appearing] to float unevenly on the surface of the canal."

These controversies became a regular feature in the English Mechanic magazine in 1904–05, which published Blount's photo and reported two experiments in 1905 that showed the opposite results. One of these, by Clement Stratton on the Ashby Canal, showed a dip on a sight-line only above the surface. In 1906, Blount published her own version of Rowbotham's Zetetic Astronomy, with her own additions. A year later, she sought to contact Alfred Russel Wallace, who had infamously attempted to debunk the flat earth decades prior, but was ignored by him.

== Other pursuits ==
Blount undertook various other pursuits during this period. She sold "Lady Blount's Muric Acid", which purported to cure rheumatism and gout, and published a pamphlet in 1905 promoted "magnetic corsets", which through magnetic currents she claimed helped against stomach ulcers, promoted the circulation and could cure a wide variety of ailments. She also claimed to have invented a type of airplane that would reportedly allow anyone who could use a bicycle to fly.

In 1909, she had founded Lady Blount’s Medical Aid Society along with Francis Sinclair Kennedy, a conman who enlisted famous accomplices under the guise of providing false teeth to the poor, and had them pay extortionate rates for sub-standard dental work. After Kennedy left the organisation in October 1909, Lady Blount continued operations from an office on Charing Cross, which also served as offices for the Universal Zetetic Society, until being evicted on January 1910. Patients had complained about having their teeth pulled by a dentist without any qualifications, and occasionally by her personal secretary and UZS vice-president Charles Watkyns de Lacy Evans, a practicing private physician without any qualifications in dentistry either, and not receiving any false teeth. She was investigated by police, and the Medical Aid Society was liquidated due to severe financial issues in 1911.

== Later life ==
In 1913, Blount and her ailing husband moved to Worthing, where she ran a business and published a book further elaborating on her cosmology. Sir Walter de Sodington Blount died in 1915 of bladder cancer, and Elizabeth Blount subsequently moved to Brighton. She continued publishing books on her ideas, including a 1921 book, titled The Dreamer, on the creation of humanity. Blount was a life-long young earth creationist, who believed the universe was created in six literal days around 6,000 years ago. This was followed the next year by a treatise on the human soul, and in 1923 by a highly controversial book on the origin of human sexes, which included the theory that Adam had two sexes.

When she was 73, on 28 August 1923, she married again to a builder and evangelist named Stephen Morgan who was forty years younger than her. In addition to her advocacy for a flat earth, Blount was a vegetarian and an anti-vivisectionist. She also became closely associated with British Israelism through her friend William Thomas Wiseman, who contributed to flat earth periodicals and edited a British Israelite publication of his own. She was a member of the "Society for the Protection of the Dark Races" and she gave that her active support, serving as its president in 1930.

Blount died on Hayling Island on 2 January 1935.

== See also ==
- Figure of the Earth
- Geodesy
- Hollow Earth
- Mark Sargent
- Modern flat Earth beliefs
- Samuel Rowbotham
- Samuel Shenton
- Spherical Earth § Effects and empirical confirmation (documenting why the flat Earth belief is mistaken)
- Wilbur Glenn Voliva

== Bibliography ==
- Garwood, Christine (2007). Flat Earth: The History of an Infamous Idea. Macmillan. ISBN 978-0-330-43289-4.
- Guimont, Edward (2026). The Power of the Flat Earth Idea: History from the Marginalised. Palgrave Macmillan. ISBN 978-3-032-23980-8.
- Schadewald, Bob; Schadewald, Wendy S. (2015). The Plane Truth.
