= Modern flat Earth beliefs =

Anti-scientific belief

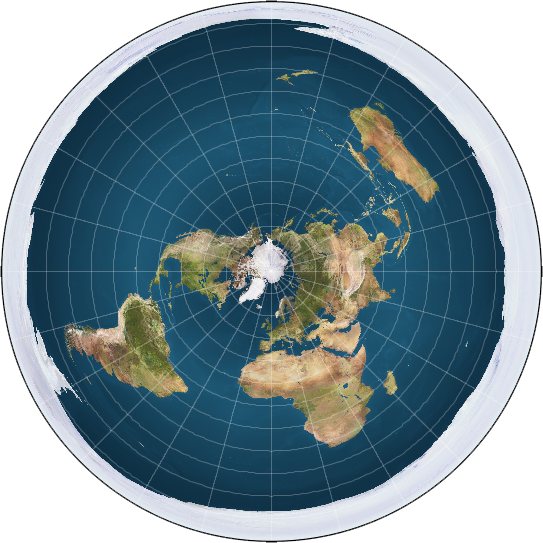
Projections of the sphere like the azimuthal equidistant projection have been co-opted as images of the flat Earth model depicting Antarctica as an ice wall surrounding a disk-shaped Earth.

Twenty-two images of Earth taken from space by the DSCOVR satellite, showing the contemporary scientific view of Earth as a spherical globe

Anti-scientific beliefs in a flat Earth are promoted by a number of organizations and individuals. The claims of modern flat Earth proponents are not based on scientific knowledge and are contrary to over two millennia of scientific consensus based on multiple confirming lines of evidence that Earth is roughly spherical. Flat Earth beliefs are classified by experts in philosophy and physics as a form of science denial.

Flat Earth groups of the modern era date from the middle of the 20th century; some adherents are serious and some are not. Those who are serious are often motivated by religion or conspiracy theories. Through the use of social media, flat Earth theories have been increasingly espoused and promoted by individuals unaffiliated with larger groups. Many believers make use of social media to spread their views.

== Background ==
Contrary to the popular belief that Earth was generally believed to be flat until a few hundred years ago, the spherical shape of Earth (and other celestial bodies) has been widely accepted in the Western world (and universally by scholars) since at least the Hellenistic period (323 BCE–31 BCE), with the first known measurement of Earth's circumference conducted by Eratosthenes.

It is only comparatively recently that the Flat Earth concept has grown widespread support, due to Samuel Rowbotham in the 19th century. Flat Earth beliefs have had a recent resurgence since 2015, due to the internet.

== 19th and early 20th centuries ==
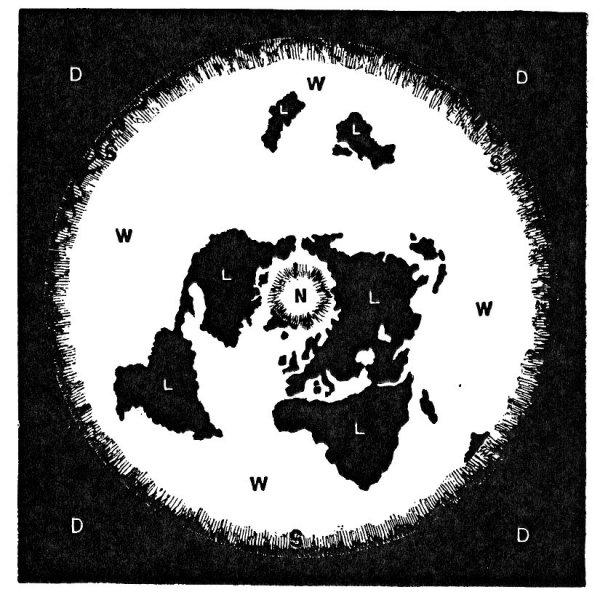
Rowbotham's flat Earth map

Modern flat Earth belief originated with the English writer Samuel Rowbotham (1816–1884). Based on conclusions derived from his 1838 Bedford Level experiment, Rowbotham published the 1849 pamphlet titled Zetetic Astronomy, writing under the pseudonym "Parallax". He later expanded this into the book Earth Not a Globe, proposing Earth is a flat disc centred at the North Pole and bounded along its southern edge by a wall of ice, Antarctica. Rowbotham further held that the Sun and Moon were 3,000 miles (4,800 km) above Earth and that the "cosmos" was 3,100 miles (5,000 km) above Earth. He also published a leaflet titled The Inconsistency of Modern Astronomy and its Opposition to the Scriptures, which argued that the "Bible, alongside our senses, supported the idea that Earth was flat and immovable and this essential truth should not be set aside for a system based solely on human conjecture".

Rowbotham and followers like William Carpenter gained attention by successful use of pseudoscience in public debates with leading scientists such as Alfred Russel Wallace. Rowbotham created a Zetetic Society in England and New York, shipping over a thousand copies of Zetetic Astronomy to the New York branch. Wallace repeated the Bedford Level experiment in 1870, correcting for atmospheric refraction and showing a spherical Earth.

In 1877, John Hampden produced a book A New Manual of Biblical Cosmography. Rowbotham also produced studies that purported to show that the effects of ships disappearing below the horizon could be explained by the laws of perspective in relation to the human eye.

After Rowbotham's death, Lady Elizabeth Blount established the Universal Zetetic Society in 1893, whose objective was "the propagation of knowledge related to Natural Cosmogony in confirmation of the Holy Scriptures, based on practical scientific investigation". The society published a magazine, The Earth Not a Globe Review, which sold for twopence and remained active well into the early 20th century. A flat Earth journal, Earth: A Monthly Magazine of Sense and Science, was published between 1901 and 1904, edited by Lady Blount. She held that the Bible was the unquestionable authority on the natural world and argued that one could not be a Christian and believe Earth is a globe. Well-known members included E. W. Bullinger of the Trinitarian Bible Society, Edward Haughton, senior moderator in natural science in Trinity College Dublin and an archbishop. She repeated Rowbotham's experiments, generating some counter-experiments, but interest declined after the First World War. The Universal Zetetic Society "was revived under different names over the years—in 1956, 1972, and 2004." The movement gave rise to several books that argued for a flat, stationary Earth, including Terra Firma by David Wardlaw Scott.

Other notable flat Earthers from this time period include:

- William Carpenter, a printer originally from Greenwich, was a supporter of Rowbotham. Carpenter published Theoretical Astronomy Examined and Exposed – Proving the Earth not a Globe in eight parts from 1864 under the name Common Sense. He later emigrated to Baltimore, where he published One Hundred Proofs the Earth is Not a Globe in 1885. He wrote: "There are rivers that flow for hundreds of miles towards the level of the sea without falling more than a few feet – notably, the Nile, which, in a thousand miles, falls but a foot. A level expanse of this extent is quite incompatible with the idea of the Earth's convexity. It is, therefore, a reasonable proof that Earth is not a globe", as well as: "If the Earth were a globe, a small model globe would be the very best – because the truest – thing for the navigator to take to sea with him. But such a thing as that is not known: with such a toy as a guide, the mariner would wreck his ship, of a certainty! This is a proof that Earth is not a globe."
- John Jasper, an American slave turned prolific preacher, and friend of Carpenter's, echoed his friend's sentiments in his most famous sermon The Sun Do Move, preached over 250 times, always by invitation. In a written account of his sermon, published in The Richmond Whig of March 19, 1878, Jasper says he would frequently cite the verse "I saw four angels standing on the four corners of the earth" and follow up by arguing: "So we are living on a four-cornered earth; then, my friends, will you tell me how in the name of God can an earth with four corners be round!" In the same article he argued: "if the earth is like others say, who hold a different theory, peopled on the other side, those people would be obliged to walk on the ground with their feet upward like flies on the ceiling of a room."
- In Brockport, New York, in 1887, M. C. Flanders argued the case of a flat Earth for three nights against two scientific gentlemen defending sphericity. Five townsmen chosen as judges voted unanimously for a flat Earth at the end. The case was reported in the Brockport Democrat.
- Joseph W. Holden of Maine, a former justice of the peace, gave numerous lectures in New England and lectured on flat-Earth theory at the Columbian Exposition in Chicago. His fame stretched to North Carolina, where the Statesville Semi-Weekly Landmark recorded at his death in 1900: "We hold to the doctrine that the Earth is flat ourselves and we regret exceedingly to learn that one of our members is dead."
- In 1898, during his solo circumnavigation of the world, Joshua Slocum encountered a group of flat-Earthers in Durban, South Africa. Three Boers, one of them a clergyman, presented Slocum with a pamphlet in which they set out to prove that the world was flat. Paul Kruger, President of the Transvaal Republic, advanced the same view: "You don't mean round the world, it is impossible! You mean in the world. Impossible!"
- From 1915 to 1942 Wilbur Glenn Voliva, who in 1906 took over the Christian Catholic Church, a Pentecostal sect that established a utopian community in Zion, Illinois, preached flat Earth doctrine. He used a photograph of a twelve-mile (19 km) stretch of the shoreline at Lake Winnebago, Wisconsin, taken three feet (91 cm) above the waterline to prove his point. When the airship Italia disappeared on an expedition to the North Pole in 1928, he warned the world's press that it had sailed over the edge of the world. He offered a $5,000 award (equivalent to $105,853 in 2025) for proving that Earth is not flat, under his own conditions. Teaching a globular Earth was banned in the Zion schools, and the message was transmitted on his WCBD radio station.
- Along with those who followed him, Frank Cherry (died 1963), the founder of the Black Hebrew Israelite religion, taught the existence of a flat Earth "surrounded by three layers of heaven."

== International Flat Earth Research Society ==
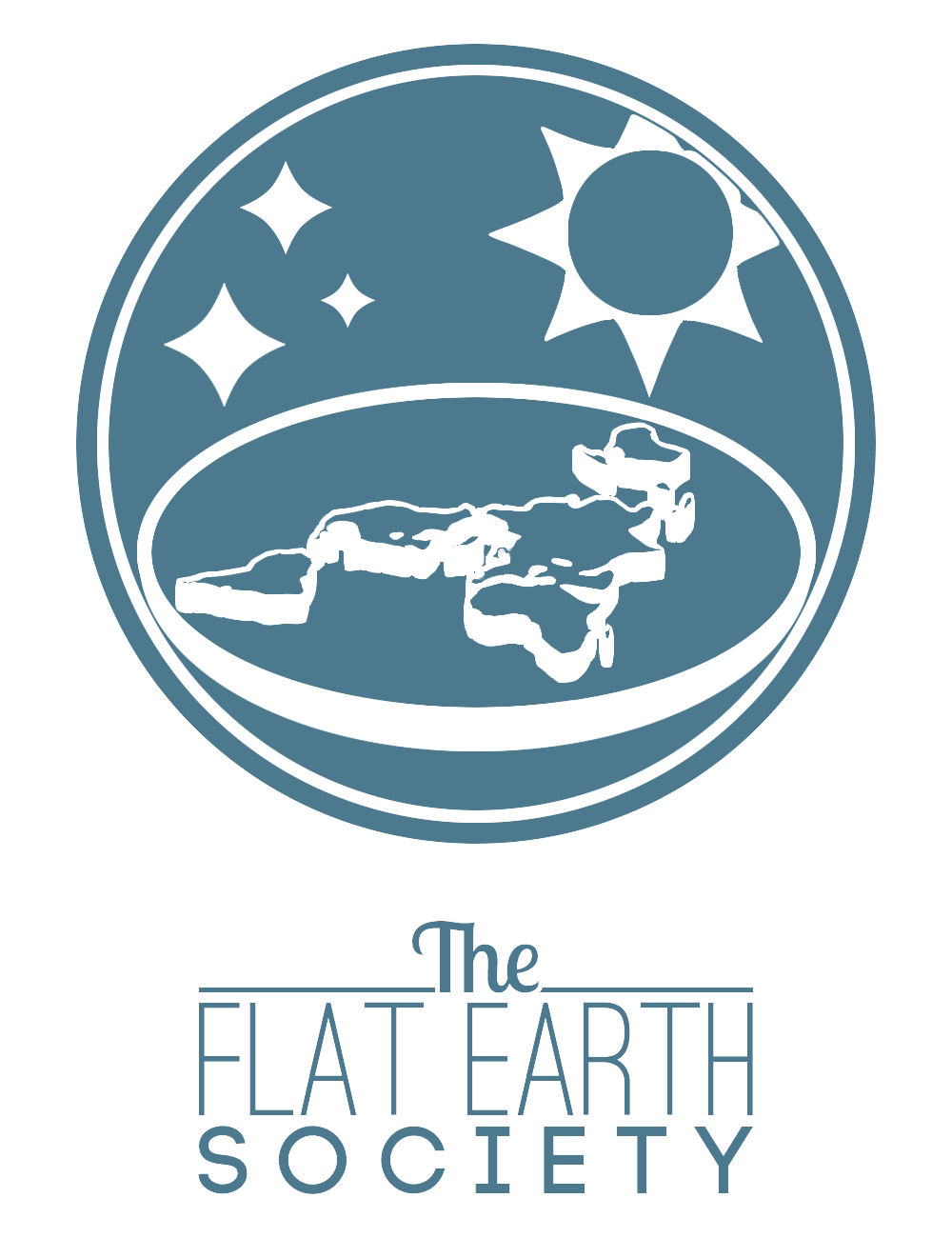
Logo of the Flat Earth Society

In 1956, Samuel Shenton created the International Flat Earth Research Society, better known as the "Flat Earth Society", as a successor to the Universal Zetetic Society, running it as "organising secretary" from his home in Dover, England. Given Shenton's interest in alternative science and technology, the emphasis on religious arguments was less than in the predecessor society. This was just before the Soviet Union launched the first artificial satellite, Sputnik; he responded: "Would sailing round the Isle of Wight prove that it were spherical? It is just the same for those satellites."

His primary aim was to reach children before they were convinced about a spherical Earth. Despite plenty of publicity, the space race eroded Shenton's support in Britain until 1967, when he started to gain attention during the Apollo program. When satellite images showed Earth as a sphere, Shenton remarked: "It's easy to see how a photograph like that could fool the untrained eye". Later asked about similar photographs taken by astronauts, he attributed curvature to the use of wide-angle lens, adding, "It's a deception of the public and it isn't right".

In 1969, Shenton persuaded Ellis Hillman, a Polytechnic of East London lecturer, to become president of the Flat Earth Society after attempts to convince Eden Thomas, a former chairman, to take on the role; but there is little evidence of any activity on his part until after Shenton's death, when he added most of Shenton's library to the archives of the Science Fiction Foundation he helped to establish.

Historical accounts and spoken history tell us the Land part may have been square, all in one mass at one time, then as now, the magnetic north being the Center. Vast cataclysmic events and shaking no doubt broke the land apart, divided the Land to be our present continents or islands as they exist today. One thing we know for sure about this world...the known inhabited world is Flat, Level, a Plain World.

— Flyer written by Charles K. Johnson, 1984.

Shenton died in 1971. Charles K. Johnson, a correspondent from California, inherited part of Shenton's library from Shenton's wife; he incorporated and became president of the International Flat Earth Research Society of America and Covenant People's Church in California. Over the next three decades, under his leadership, the Flat Earth Society grew to a reported 3,500 members.

Johnson spent years examining the studies of flat- and round-Earth theories and proposed evidence of a conspiracy against flat Earth: "The idea of a spinning globe is only a conspiracy of error that Moses, Columbus, and FDR all fought..." His article was published in the magazine Science Digest in 1980. It goes on to state: "If it is a sphere, the surface of a large body of water must be curved. The Johnsons have checked the surfaces of Lake Tahoe and the Salton Sea without detecting any curvature."

Johnson issued many publications and handled all membership applications. The most famous publication was Flat Earth News, a quarterly, four-page tabloid. Johnson paid for these publications through annual member dues costing US$6 to US$10 over the course of his leadership. Johnson cited the Bible for his beliefs, and he saw scientists as pulling a hoax which would replace religion with science.

The Flat Earth Society's most recent planet model is that humanity lives on a disc, with the North Pole at its centre and a 150-foot-high (46 m) wall of ice, Antarctica, at the outer edge. The resulting map resembles the symbol of the United Nations, which Johnson used as evidence for his position. In this model, the Sun and Moon are each 32 miles (51 km) in diameter.

The Flat Earth Society recruited members by speaking against the US government and all its agencies, particularly NASA. Much of the society's literature in its early days focused on interpreting the Bible to mean that Earth is flat, although they did try to offer scientific explanations and evidence.

=== Criticism ===
Eugenie Scott called the group an example of "extreme Biblical-literalist theology: The earth is flat because the Bible says it is flat, regardless of what science tells us."

According to some flat Earthers, the Flat Earth Society is a government-controlled organization whose true purpose is to make ridiculous claims about flat Earth and therefore discredit the flat Earth movement.

=== Decline and relaunch ===
According to Charles K. Johnson, the membership of the group rose to 3,500 under his leadership but began to decline after a fire at his house in 1997 which destroyed all of the records and contacts of the society's members. Johnson's wife, who helped manage the membership database, died shortly thereafter. Johnson himself died on 19 March 2001.

In 2004, Daniel Shenton (not related to Samuel) resurrected the Flat Earth Society, basing it around a web-based discussion forum. In the late 1990s, Thomas Dolby's 1984 album The Flat Earth had inspired Shenton to look into the Flat Earth Society, and he came to believe in its ideas. He believes that no one has provided proof that the world is not flat. This eventually led to the official relaunch of the society in October 2009, and the creation of a new website, featuring a public collection of flat Earth literature and a wiki. Moreover, the society began accepting new members for the first time since 2001. Dolby accepted Shenton's offer of membership number 00001, although he does not believe Earth is flat. As of July 2017, over 500 people had become members.

In 2013, part of this society broke away to form a new web-based group also featuring a forum and wiki.

== By country ==
=== Canada ===
The Flat Earth Society of Canada was established on 8 November 1970 by philosopher Leo Ferrari, writer Raymond Fraser and poet Alden Nowlan; and was active until 1984. Its archives are held at the University of New Brunswick.

Calling themselves "planoterrestrialists", their aims were quite different from other flat Earth societies. They claimed a prevailing problem of the new technological age was the willingness of people to accept theories "on blind faith and to reject the evidence of their own senses." The parodic intention of the Society appeared in the writings of Ferrari, as he attributed everything from gender to racial inequality on the globularist and the spherical Earth model. Ferrari also claimed to have nearly fallen off "the Edge" of Earth at Brimstone Head on Fogo Island.

Ferrari was interviewed as an "expert" in the 1990 flat Earth mockumentary In Search of the Edge by Pancake Productions (a reference to the expression "as flat as a pancake"). In the accompanying study guide, Ferrari is outed as a "globularist", a nonce word for someone who believes Earth is spherical. The real intent of the film, which was part-funded by the Ontario Arts Council and National Film Board of Canada, was to promote schoolchildren's critical thinking and media literacy by "[attempting] to prove in convincing fashion, something everyone knew to be false."

==== Relaunch ====
Multi-media artist Kay Burns re-created the Flat Earth Society of Canada as an art project with her alter ego Iris Taylor as its president. Burns created an installation entitled the Museum of the Flat Earth, which included some artefacts from the 1970 group. It was exhibited in 2016 at the Flat Earth Outpost Café in Shoal Bay, Newfoundland.

=== Italy ===
In Italy, there are no centralised societies on flat Earth. However, since the 2010s, small groups of conspiracy theorists, who carry out meetings, started to emerge and to spread flat Earth theories. Among these are Calogero Greco, Albino Galuppini and Agostino Favari, who in 2018–2019 organised several meetings in Palermo, Sicily, with an entry price of €20.

Among their claims are:

- NASA is similar to Disneyland and that astronauts are actors.
- The April 2019 photo of the supermassive black hole at the core of the supergiant elliptical galaxy Messier 87 is fake.
- The proof Earth is flat can be demonstrated with a filled bottle where, if placed horizontally, water never curves.

In addition to these, it is their common belief that the United States has a plan to create in Europe a new America open to everyone, where the only value is consumerism and that George Soros commands a satanic globalist conspiracy. They reject the past existence of dinosaurs, the Darwinian theory of evolution, and the authority of the scientific community, claiming scientists are Freemasons.

Former leader of the Five Star Movement political party Beppe Grillo showed interest in the group, admitting to admiring their free speech spirit and to wanting to participate at the May 2019 conference. However, Grillo did not appear.

== Internet-era resurgence ==
In November 2017 "more than five hundred people ... paid as much as $249 each to attend "the first-ever Flat Earth Conference", in a suburb of Raleigh, North Carolina, U.S. According to a 2018 YouGov opinion poll, "just 66% of millennials firmly believe" that Earth is round, with celebrities (rapper B.o.B., basketball players Kyrie Irving and Wilson Chandler) advocating for flatness.

=== Sociological explanations for counterfactual beliefs ===
A popular 2020 YouTube debate about the Flat Earth concept, between science advocate and atheist activist Aron Ra and flat-earther Nathan Thompson

In the Information Age, the availability of communications technology and social media such as YouTube, Facebook and Twitter have made it easy for individuals, famous or not, to spread disinformation and attract others to erroneous ideas. One of the topics that has flourished in this environment is that of the flat Earth. These sites have made it easier for like-minded theorists to connect with one another and mutually reinforce their beliefs. Social media has had a "levelling effect", in that experts have less sway in the public mind than they used to.

YouTube has faced criticism for allowing the spread of misinformation and conspiracy theories through its platform, specifically, flat Earth. In 2019, YouTube stated that it was making changes in its software to reduce the distribution of videos based on conspiracy theories including flat Earth. Professor Asheley Landrum "called on scientists themselves to fight back by using YouTube as a platform to communicate their own work. "We don't want YouTube to be full of videos saying here are all these reasons the Earth is flat," she said. "We need other videos saying here's why those reasons aren't real and here's a bunch of ways you can research it for yourself.""

In the documentary Behind the Curve (2018) (which follows prominent modern flat-Earthers including Mark Sargent and Patricia Steere, as well as astrophysicists and psychologists who attempt to explain the growing fad), professor of psychiatry Joe Pierre offers as explanations: the Dunning-Kruger effect (the phenomenon whereby ignorance in a given field makes people unable to recognize their own ignorance or lack of ability in that field); misunderstandings of simple observation; pseudoscientific practices which fail to separate reliable from unreliable conclusions; and a progressive divergence from reality that starts with a belief that conventional information sources and the government cannot be trusted.

Out of the necessity to explain photographs of Earth in space, the observations of astronauts, why all major institutions such as governments, media outlets, schools, scientists, and airlines assert that the world is a sphere, etc., modern flat-Earthers very commonly embrace some form of conspiracy theory. As Darryle Marble, a speaker at the Flat Earth Conference, told his audience, after watching hours of YouTube conspiracy videos on Sandy Hook, 9/11, false flags, the Bilderbergers, Rothschilds, Illuminati – "Each thing started to make that much more sense. I was already primed to receive the whole flat-Earth idea, because we had already come to the conclusion that we were being deceived about so many other things. So of course they would lie to us about this."

Conspiracy belief is often intertwined with conservative Christian belief. According to internet influencer Rob Skiba, "the ultimate motivation" of the (alleged) conspiracy of a round earth in space, "many of us have come to believe, is hiding God." Reading the Bible, "when you break down the text of what it represents, there's no way you can get a spinning heliocentric globe out of anything in the Bible." (According to author Alan Burdick, "in style and substance, the flat-Earth movement is a close cousin of creationism.")

Flat-Earthers tend to not trust observations they have not made themselves, and often distrust or disagree with each other. Patricia Steere admitted in Behind the Curve that she would not believe an event like the Boston Marathon bombing was real unless she had gotten her own leg blown off. Flat Earth believers in the documentary also professed belief in conspiracy theories about vaccines, genetically modified organisms, chemtrails, 9/11, and transgender people; some said dinosaurs and evolution were also fake, and that heliocentrism is a form of Sun worship.

The scientific experts in Behind the Curve pointed to confirmation bias as a way to maintain a counterfactual belief, by cherry-picking only supporting evidence, and dismissing any disconfirming evidence as part of the purported global conspiracy.

Some flat Earth believers, such as authors Zen Garcia and Edward Hendrie, cite the Christian Bible as evidence. Some critics of the flat Earth idea, such as astronomer Danny R. Faulkner, are young Earth creationists and attempt to explain away the Bible's supposed flat Earth language.

On 3 May 2018, Steven Novella analysed the modern belief in a flat Earth, and concluded that, despite what most people think about the subject, the believers are being sincere in their belief that Earth is flat, and are not "just saying that to wind us up". He stated that:

In the end that is the core malfunction of the flat-earthers, and the modern populist rejection of expertise in general. It is a horrifically simplistic view of the world that ignores (partly out of ignorance, and partly out of motivated reasoning) to [sic] real complexities of our civilisation. It is ultimately lazy, childish, and self-indulgent, resulting in a profound level of ignorance drowning in motivated reasoning.

The British sceptical activist Michael Marshall attended the annual Flat Earth UK Convention on 27–29 April 2018 and noted disagreement on several views among believers in a flat Earth. To Marshall, one of the most telling moments at the convention was the "Flat Earth Addiction" test that was based on a checklist used to determine whether someone is in a cult, without the convention attendees realising the possibility of themselves being in a cult.

=== Beliefs ===
Flat Earth Society believes the Earth is a disk, with the Sun and the Moon, both spherical, rotating above the disk.

Based on the speakers at the 2018 UK's Flat Earth UK Convention, believers in a flat Earth vary widely in their views. While most agree upon a disc-shaped Earth, some are convinced that Earth is diamond-shaped. Furthermore, while most believers do not believe in outer space and none believe humans have ever travelled there, they vary widely in their views of the universe. (Flat Earth International Conferences, organized by Robbie Davidson, are unaffiliated with the Flat Earth Society. According to Davidson, the "Earth is ... a stationary plane, with the sun, moon, and stars inside a dome", while the Flat Earth Society promotes a model in which Earth is "a disk flying through space", and which Davidson finds "incredibly ridiculous".)

Filmmakers of Behind the Curve attended another flat Earth conference at which a substantial number of people believed that Earth was an infinite plane, potentially with more continents beyond the purported circular ice wall of Antarctica. Members of the Flat Earth Society and other flat-Earthers claim that NASA and other government agencies conspire to fabricate evidence that Earth is spherical. According to the most widely spread version of current flat-Earth theory, NASA is guarding the Antarctic ice wall that surrounds Earth. Flat-Earthers argue that NASA manipulates and fabricates its satellite images, based on observations that the colour of the oceans changes from image to image and that continents seem to be in different places. The publicly perpetuated image is kept up through a large-scale practice of "compartmentalization", according to which only a select number of individuals have knowledge about the truth. Flat-Earthers have used footage from dust, ice and water particles escaping from spaceships to claim that the International Space Station is "underwater", akin to the NASA Neutral Buoyancy Laboratory swimming pool used as a training center for astronauts; as well as misrepresented and incomplete footage of objects floating inside the ISS in order to deny the weightlessness experienced by bodies in orbit.

Research by Carlos Diaz Ruiz and Tomas Nilsson on the arguments that flat Earthers wield, shows three factions, each one subscribing to its own set of beliefs.

The first faction subscribes to a faith-based conflict in which atheists use science to suppress the Christian faith. Their argument is that atheists use pseudo-science – evolution, Big Bang, and the round Earth – to make people believe that God is an abstract idea, not real. Instead, their arguments use the Scripture – word-by-word – to support an argument that enables God to really exist. This faction frames flat-Earth arguments as revelatory. (For example, a literal interpretation of Revelation 7 — "I saw four angels standing at the four corners of the earth ..." — indicates Earth must have four corners.) This is in spite of the fact that a circular flat earth would also not have corners, contradicting the central model of flat earth. This contradiction seems to imply that God created a 2D quadrilateral or 3D tetrahedral earth.

The second faction believes in an overarching conspiracy for knowledge suppression. Building upon the premise that knowledge is power, the flat Earth conspiracy argues that a shadowy group of "elites" control knowledge to remain in power. In their view, lying about the fundamental nature of Earth primes the population to believe a host of other conspiracies. This faction frames flat-Earth arguments as liberatory.

The third faction believes that knowledge is personal and experiential. They are dismissive of knowledge that comes from authoritative sources, especially book knowledge. This faction would like to find out themselves whether Earth truly is round or flat. Because they distrust book knowledge and mathematical proof, this faction believes that Earth is flat because their observations and lived experiences make it appear that Earth is a flat surface. This faction frames flat-Earth arguments as experimental.

Fellow flat earthers are not exempt from distrust and belief that they may be in cahoots with round earthers. In Behind the Curve, conference attendees were warned against attending by Math Powerland, also known as Matt Boylan, who posted videos alleging others were working for the CIA or Warner Brothers. At the 2017 Flat Earth conference:

[S]everal speakers made reference to "shills" within the community, people purporting to espouse the theory but who in fact belong to some deep-state counterintelligence program aimed at making the movement seem laughable. In 2016, Eric Dubay, of the "200 Proofs" video, called out Mark Sargent, Jeran Campanella, and other figures as "suspected controlled opposition shills," and last year in a radio interview he called the November conference a "shill-fest." Even the flat-Earth bureaucracy is suspect. At the end of the conference's second day, a panelist mentioned a plan to set up a nonprofit to carry on the work. This brought a rebuke from a woman in the audience. "You had me up until I heard the gentleman say, 'The reason we had to scramble to get the 501(c)(3),'" she said. "In my research, I found out that's a Luciferian contract."

=== Social and experimental activities of sceptics and believers ===
Organisations sceptical of fringe beliefs have occasionally performed tests to demonstrate the local curvature of Earth. One of these, conducted by members of the Independent Investigations Group of the Center for Inquiry, at the Salton Sea on 10 June 2018 was attended also by supporters of a flat Earth, and the encounter between the two groups was recorded by the National Geographic Explorer. This experiment successfully demonstrated the curvature of Earth via the disappearance over distance of boat-based and shore-based targets. IIG founder Jim Underdown reported that the flat Earth supporters in attendance immediately rejected the results, denying the validity of the demonstration after the fact, and the discussion degenerated into tangents about Moon landing conspiracy theories and alleged NASA cover-ups.

The 2018 documentary Behind the Curve followed two groups of American flat Earth believers who were attempting to gather first-hand empirical proof for that belief. One group from the YouTube show GlobeBusters used a ring laser gyroscope in an attempt to show that Earth was not rotating. Instead, they detected the actual 15-degree-per-hour rotation of Earth, a measurement they dismissed as corrupted by the device somehow picking up the rotation of the "firmament". Another group used lasers in an attempt to show a several-mile stretch of water is perfectly flat by measuring the distance between the water level and the laser beam along three vertical posts. They were unable to align the beam as they expected to because the surface of the still water was in fact bent by several feet over the distance measured; the experiment was dismissed as inconclusive. Similar experiments involving lasers projected across a long, flat surface are deemed unreliable due to not taking into account atmospheric refraction and the divergence of light.

Behind the Curve illustrated how flat Earth believers rely on poorly-verified claims. Mark Sargent claimed to have watched flightaware.com for a very long time to check if any flights travelled between continents in the southern hemisphere, which in his disc model would be much further apart than they are on the globe. He stated that he saw no such flights, and took this as evidence for the disc model. Caltech astrophysicist Hannalore Gerling-Dunsmore went to the site and immediately found flights that contradicted Sargent's claims.

Optical illusions of sufficiently translucent clouds appearing to "pass" behind the Sun due to the insufficient contrast sunlight directly in front of the Sun produces have been recorded on video and also used by flat-earthers to try to show that the Sun isn't in outer space and the Earth is flat. The solar eclipse of 21 August 2017 gave rise to numerous YouTube videos purporting to show how the details of the eclipse prove that Earth is flat.

In 2017, "the Tunisian and Arab scientific and educational world" had a scandal when a Ph.D. student at the University of Sfax in Tunisia submitted a Ph.D. dissertation "declaring Earth to be flat, unmoving, young (only 13,500 years of age), and the centre of the universe". In 2018, astronomer Yaël Nazé analysed the controversy over the dissertation. The dissertation, which had not been approved by the committee overseeing environmental studies theses, had been made public and denounced in 2017 by Hafedh Ateb, a founder of the Tunisian Astronomical Society, on his Facebook page.

In March 2019, social media personality Logan Paul released a satirical documentary film about the flat Earth called FLAT EARTH: To The Edge And Back.

On December 14, 2024, retired businessman and pastor Will Duffy paid to bring believers in the concept of a flat earth to Union Glacier Camp in Antarctica for them to witness day-long illumination. While participants of the so-called Final Experiment had to concede they witnessed the midnight sun in Antarctica, not all of them accepted on the spot that Earth is a sphere.

==== Mike Hughes ====
Mike Hughes, a daredevil/stuntman, planned to use a homebuilt crewed rocket to reach outer space. In a practice flight on 22 February 2020, the early deployment and separation of the return parachute allowed his rocket to fall unimpeded from an altitude of several hundred feet, killing him instantly.

After Hughes' death, his public relations representative Darren Shuster stated that Hughes "didn't believe in flat Earth" and that it was "a PR stunt" to get publicity, while Michael Linn, who worked on the documentary Rocketman: Mad Mike's Mission to Prove the Flat-Earth, said that Hughes' belief appeared genuine.

=== Social consequences and responses ===
Behind the Curve's filmmakers spoke with several people who said that as a result of their flat Earth beliefs they had lost romantic partners and no longer spoke to many friends and family. One said he was tired of being told he was an idiot. The Facebook group Flat Earth Match is a dating site used by some to find romantic partners who share these beliefs. Experts pointed out that after social ties to people outside the flat Earth community are lost, one consequence of abandoning the flat Earth belief would be loss of all remaining relationships.

Caltech physicist Spiros Michaelakis stated that instead of denigrating flat Earthers, scientists should do a better job of teaching scientific facts. Various scientific and medical experts in the documentary supported improving scientific literacy and avoiding marginalization of flat Earthers. They pointed out that people who distrust all of science, including truths about vaccines, evolution, and climate change, would make poorly informed decisions, and that people who do not exercise the skill of critical thinking can be easily manipulated. They also pointed out that some believers were motivated to spread false ideas, and that because these ideas are unconstrained by facts they can mutate and become less harmless than a mere belief about the shape of Earth.

=== Prevalence ===
In 2020, it was reported that based on polling by Datafolha, 7% of Brazilians believed in a flat Earth. A 2018 YouGov poll found that around 4% of the population of the United States believed in flat Earth, while the POLES 2021 Survey found around 10% of the United States population believed that Earth is flat. A 2019 YouGov survey found that around 3% of British people supported flat Earth.

== The term "flat-Earther" ==
The term flat-Earth-man, used in a derogatory sense to mean anyone who holds ridiculously antiquated or impossible views, predates the more compact flat-earther. It was recorded in 1908: "Fewer votes than one would have thought possible for any human candidate, were he even a flat-earth-man." According to the Oxford English Dictionary, the first use of the term flat-Earther was in 1934 in Punch magazine: "Without being a bigoted flat-earther, [Mercator] perceived the nuisance ... of fiddling about with globes ... in order to discover the South Seas."

== See also ==
- Empirical evidence for the spherical shape of Earth
- Figure of Earth
- Geodesy
- Hollow Earth
- Myth of the flat Earth
- Young Earth creationism
- Category:Flat Earth proponents
- Geocentrism#Religious and contemporary adherence to geocentrism

== Notes and references ==
=== References ===
- Garwood, Christine (2007). Flat Earth: the History of an infamous idea. Macmillan.
- Ambrose, Graham (7 July 2017). "These Coloradans say Earth is flat. And gravity's a hoax. Now they're being persecuted". The Denver Post.
- Valenzuela, S. (19 April 2019). History's most famous Flat Earth believers: Athletes, celebrities, and ancient Greeks. Retrieved 3 March 2020
- Lewis, D. (2016, January 28). The curious history of the International Flat Earth Society. Smithsonian Magazine. https://www.smithsonianmag.com/smart-news/curious-history-international-flat-earth-society-180957969/
