= Museum of the Flat Earth =

Flat earth museum

Coordinates: 49.6919°N 54.1893°W

The Museum of the Flat Earth is a small museum dedicated to the history of the Canadian Flat Earth Society, located on Fogo Island, Newfoundland. It has a variety of historical collections covering the life of Bartholomew Seeker, as well as other individuals associated with the Canadian Flat Earth Society, and a series of more contemporary displays which deal with debates around the notion of a Flat Earth.

== Overview ==
The Museum was formally opened in May 2016 by Dr Iris Taylor and Kay Burns as the culmination of 14 years formal research and public education.

It has a varied educational outreach programme, working with both the local community as well as visiting researchers, writers and creative practitioners. In 2017, the Museum launched a formal visiting artist programme, with the theme of the Great Auk. Artists participating in the programme included Yvonne Mullock, Marcus Coates and Michael Waterman.

It is based in a small building in Shoal Bay that includes a coffee bar and Museum Shop carrying unique flat earth items, with ample visitor parking. The Museum's location also has strong links to Flat Earth theory, with Brimstone Head, labelled as one of the corners of the Flat Earth, which is a prominent geological feature on Fogo Island.

== The History of the Museum ==
The Museum has its roots in the 1970s revival of the Flat Earth Society of Canada, by a group of academics at the St. Thomas University, New Brunswick, which included Leo Ferrari, Alden Nowlan and Ray Fraser. However, the Society's activities declined in the early 1980s and it was only revived in 2003 by independent researcher Iris Taylor as a result of several visits to Fogo Island and extensive research at the University of New Brunswick Special Collections archives.

== The Collections ==
The Museum's Collections cover several areas and include:

- Items relating to the historic Flat Earth Society of Canada
- Personal effects of Bartholomew Seeker, resident of Fogo Island
- Objects excavated in August 2017 at Brimstone Head
