= Blount baronets of Sodington (1642) =

Extinct baronetcy in the Baronetage of England

Blount baronets
- Blount baronets of Sodington
- Creation date: 1642
- Status: extinct
- Extinction date: 2004
- Motto: Lux tua via mea, Your light is my way

The Blount Baronetcy, of Sodington in the County of Worcester, was created in the Baronetage of England on 5 October 1642 for Walter Blount, High Sheriff of Worcestershire in 1619 and Member of Parliament for Droitwich from 1624 to 1625. He later fought as a Royalist in the Civil War. He was captured in 1645 and imprisoned in the Tower of London. In 1652 he was convicted of treason and his estates at Sodington Hall, Worcestershire, and at Mawley Hall, Shropshire were sequestrated. The family recovered the estates after the Restoration of Charles II.

The title descended in the direct line until the death of his grandson, the third Baronet, in 1717. The late Baronet was succeeded by his nephew, the fourth Baronet. He was succeeded by his elder son, the fifth Baronet. He died childless and was succeeded by his younger brother, the sixth Baronet. His grandson, the eighth Baronet, was high sheriff of Worcestershire in 1835. His son, the ninth Baronet, was a deputy lieutenant of Worcestershire. His eldest son, the tenth Baronet, died childless and was succeeded by his younger brother, the eleventh Baronet. The title became extinct on the death of the latter's son, the twelfth Baronet, in 2004.

== Blount baronets, of Sodington (1642) ==
- Sir Walter Blount, 1st Baronet (c. 1594–1654)
- Sir George Blount, 2nd Baronet (died 1667)
- Sir Walter Kirkham Blount, 3rd Baronet (died 1717)
- Sir Edward Blount, 4th Baronet (died 1758)
- Sir Edward Blount, 5th Baronet (c. 1724–1765)
- Sir Walter Blount, 6th Baronet (died 1785)
- Sir Walter Blount, 7th Baronet (1768–1803)
- Sir Edward Blount, 8th Baronet (1795–1881)
- Sir Walter de Sodington Blount, 9th Baronet (1833–1915), married to Lady Elizabeth Blount
- Sir Walter Aston Blount, 10th Baronet (1876–1958)
- Sir (Edward) Robert Blount, 11th Baronet (1884–1978)
- Sir Walter Edward Alpin Blount, 12th Baronet (1917–2004)

== Extended family ==
Sir Edward Charles Blount (1809–1905), son of Edward Blount, Member of Parliament for Steyning, second son of the sixth Baronet, was an important banker and railway promoter in France. Blount, Barons Mountjoy were descended from this branch of the family.

Lady Elizabeth Blount who had married the 9th baronet was a leading exponent of the Flat Earth idea.

== See also ==
- Blount baronets
