= Leo Ferrari =

Canadian flat earther

Leo Charles Ferrari
- Born: December 8, 1927; Bathurst, New South Wales, Australia
- Died: October 7, 2010 (aged 82); Fredericton, New Brunswick, Canada
- Education: University of Sydney (B.Sc) 1948; Laval University (Ph.D) 1957
- Occupation: Philosophy professor
- Years active: 1961–1995
- Employer: St. Thomas University
- Title: Professor emeritus
- Spouse: Lorna E. Drew

Leo Charles Ferrari (December 8, 1927 – October 7, 2010) was a St. Thomas University philosophy professor, noted Saint Augustine scholar, and founding member of the organization Flat Earth Society of Canada.

== Flat Earth Society activities ==
Leo Ferrari was a founding member and head of the Flat Earth Society of Canada, later renamed the Flat Earth Society (FES).

In Ferrari's writings in support of the FES and the Flat Earth, he attributed everything from gender to racial inequality on the globularist and the Spherical Earth model. Ferrari even claimed to have nearly fallen off "the Edge" of the Earth at Brimstone Head on Fogo Island.

Ferrari was a key figure in the 1990 flat earth "documentary", In Search of the Edge. In the accompanying study guide, Ferrari is outed as a "globularist," someone who believes the earth is spherical. The intent of the film was to promote critical thinking about media by "[attempting] to prove in convincing fashion, something everyone knew to be false."

== Bibliography ==
- The conversions of Saint Augustine. Villanova, Pennsylvania: Villanova University Press. 1984. ISBN 9780877230397. OCLC 17228498.
- Different Minds/ Living with Alzheimer Disease. (with Lorna Drew). Villanova, Pennsylvania: Villanova University Press. 2005. ISBN 9780864924438. OCLC 17228498.

Published Essays

- Ferrari, Leo (1975). "Feminism and Education in a Flat Earth Perspective". McGill Journal of Education. X (1): 77–81.

Human Rights Pamphlets

- The rise of human rights; a Canadian outline. Fredericton, New Brunswick: Human Rights Commission, Dept. of Labour, 1970. OCLC 107688
- Human rights and the Canadian Indian. Fredericton, New Brunswick: Human Rights Commission, Dept. of Labour, 1973. OCLC 3570417
- Human rights in a changing world : the problem of preserving human values in the upheavals caused by science and technology. Fredericton, New Brunswick: Human Rights Commission, Dept. of Labour, 1977. OCLC 3968828

Poetry

- The worm's revenge. Fredericton, New Brunswick: Mortuary Press, 1968. OCLC 18945843
- Over the Edge: Poems in Grateful Celebration of Fifty Years of Life, Love and of Laughter. Fredericton, New Brunswick: Owl and the Pussycat, 1977. OCLC 5488675
