= Kay Burns =

Canadian artist

Kay Burns is a multidisciplinary artist based in Fogo Island, Newfoundland.

Burns's work includes: performance art, locative media, audio, video, photography, sculpture, and installation. Her practice engages in site-specific responses to locations through a reinterpretation of local mythologies, histories, and the eccentricities of people who inhabit those places. Her work melds fact and fiction through alternative constructions of place and event, indirectly commenting on the authority associated with the dissemination of information.

A significant part of Burns's practice has been the reinstatement of the defunct Flat Earth Society of Canada through her performance persona, Iris Taylor, entailing presentations of an evolving 'recruitment lecture' and the ongoing development of flat earth artifacts. Her performance work also includes guided 'historical' walks as Iris Taylor, and an extended walking practice through her involvement as a founding member of the Ministry of Walking collective. Her work has been presented internationally in Reykjavík, Amsterdam, Belfast, New York City, and Los Angeles; and across Canada from Dawson to St. John's.

Burns previously held the post of curator at the Muttart Public Art Gallery in Calgary, and taught in the University of Calgary Fine Arts Department and the Alberta College of Art and Design Media Art Department prior to her move to Newfoundland. Burns continues to undertake freelance writing and curatorial projects, as well as mentorship and visiting teaching roles for various organizations and institutions.
