= Samuel Rowbotham =

English charlatan (1816–1884)

- Born: Samuel Birley Rowbotham; 1816; Stockport, England
- Died: 23 December 1884 (aged 67–68); London, England
- Known for: Flat earth proponent
- Spouse(s): Nancy ? (m. before 1861) Caroline Elizabeth West (m. 1861)
- Children: 15

Samuel Birley Rowbotham (/ˈroʊbɒtəm/; 1816 – 23 December 1884, in London) was an English inventor, writer, utopian socialist, quack doctor and flat Earther who wrote Zetetic Astronomy: Earth Not a Globe under the pseudonym Parallax. His work was originally published as a 16-page pamphlet (1849), and later expanded into a book (1865).

Rowbotham's method, which he called zetetic astronomy, models the Earth as a flat disc centered at the North Pole and bounded along its perimeter by a wall of ice, with the Sun, Moon, planets, and stars moving only several thousand miles above its surface. Rowbotham's work is generally credited with the modern revival of belief in a flat Earth.

== Early life ==
Samuel Birley Rowbotham was born in 1816 in Stockport. His father was a merchant from a prominent local family, and his mother hailed from a wealthy family of industrialists. According to a likely self-aggrandized autobiographical account published in 1872, Rowbotham had begun to question the theories of Isaac Newton at the age of 7, and had been expelled from school after having snuck out of a astronomy lecture with a friend. He was sent to live with his grandfather, who introduced him to astronomy to a skeptical Rowbotham, who vowed to one day disprove the established wisdom about the universe. In his younger years, he vacilitated in ideology between strict Biblical literalism and the utopian socialist teachings of Robert Owen, becoming an itinerant lecturer on various socialist and scientific topics.

In 1842, Rowbotham, under the pseudonym Tryon, published his first pamphlet, An Inquiry into the Cause of Natural Death, which was published in book form by the socialist publisher Abel Heywood in 1845. In it, he proposed that aging and death were the result of "earthly matter", namely phosphate and sulphate of lime, building up within the body. By avoiding foods containing such earthly matter, including salt and wheat bread (nicknamed the "Staff of Death" by Rowbotham) and eating plenty of fruits, vegetables, and meat, one could halt the aging process and become almost immortal.

Despite holding no medical credentials of any kind, Rowbotham in his 1842 pamphlet claimed to have personally cured 320 patients with a 100% success rate of various ailments, including heart palpitations, rheumatism and paralysis, using a combination of "Tartaric, Hydro-chloric, and Nitric acids". This claim was dropped in the 1845 book version, which replaced it with support for the health and longevity benefits of "free phosphorus", contained within phosphoric acid. Taking phosphoric acid would also combat the use alcohol and opium as well as sexual desire, while simultaneously restoring one's sexual virility.

== Career ==
Rowbotham started out as an organiser of an Owenite community at Manea in the Fens, where he formulated his ideas about the Earth. He left the commune however following accusations that he had engaged in human trafficking and "free love". According to Rowbotham in 1872, he had joined the community purely as a means of gathering evidence proving the flat Earth, and had left after his fellow commune members threatened him due to his views.

Rowbotham's flat earth views were preceded and likely based upon the ideas of an anonymous 1819 pamphlet titled The Anti-Newtonian, which first proposed a flat earth surrounded by an ice wall. After measuring a lack of curvature on the long straight drainage ditches of the Bedford Levels, located close to the Manea commune, in his first Bedford Level experiment in 1838, he was convinced of the flatness of the Earth and began to lecture on the topic. He took some time to learn his trade, running away from a lecture in Blackburn when he could not explain why the hulls of ships disappeared before their masts when sailing out to sea. However, as he persisted in filling halls by charging sixpence a lecture, his quick-wittedness and debating skills were honed so much that he could "counter every argument with ingenuity, wit and consummate skill". In 1849, he published his first work in support of the flat earth titled Zetetic Astronomy, which outlined six experiments supposedly proving the absence of Earth's curvature. The term 'zetetic' originated from the Greek verb zeteo, meaning to enquire, and had previously been used by Pythagoras as well as figures within radical, free-thinking British circles in the 18th century, which provided. This was followed by The Inconsistency of Modern Astronomy and its Opposition to the Scriptures, which supplemented Rowbotham's experiments with a literalist analysis of the Bible that proves the earth to be a flat, immovable plane.

Rowbotham strongly opposed the concept of scientific theories in general as "fatal to the full development of truth", and condemning Newtonian physics in particular as a "juggle and jumble" of lies meant to deceive the public. He saw empiricism, similarly to the Baconian method and the 18th century Scottish 'common-sense' school of realism, as the only true way of verifying facts in order to disabuse the public of the erroneous theories which had convinced the public that the earth was a sphere, a proposition that Rowbotham considered completely unproven. The 'zetetic method' emphasised that anyone could reach the truth through doing one's own research and conducting experiments, a reliance on common sense, and condemned conventional scientists as elitist.

Rowbotham spent much of the 1850s traveling Great Britain and holding lectures on his theories. These were followed by question and answer sections, where critics would attempt to debate him. When his debaters were unsatisfied with his stock responses to frequent objections, Rowbotham would summarily dismiss them and move on to another question. By the 1860s, Rowbotham had become widely known for his flat-earth theories.

When finally pinned down to a challenge in Plymouth in 1864 by allegations that he would not agree to a test, Rowbotham appeared on Plymouth Hoe at the appointed time, witnessed by Richard A. Proctor, a writer on astronomy, and proceeded to the beach where a telescope had been set up. His opponents had claimed that only the lantern of the Eddystone Lighthouse, some 14 miles out to sea, would be visible. In fact, only half the lantern was visible, yet Rowbotham claimed his opponents were wrong and that it proved the Earth was indeed flat so that many Plymouth folk left the Hoe agreeing that "some of the most important conclusions of modern astronomy had been seriously invalidated".

In 1856, Rowbotham married for a second time and had two children, one of whom died in infancy. In 1861, when he was 46, Rowbotham married Caroline Elizabeth West, a 16-year-old girl (with whom he was living at the time of the marriage) and settled in London, producing 15 known children, of whom only four survived. He was named in numerous cases of wrongful deaths, including a "death by misadventure" for accidentally poisoning one of his own children. He was named responsible for other deaths using his quack cures of phosphorus. Augustus De Morgan refers to him as S. Goulden. He patented a number of inventions, including a "life-preserving cylindrical railway carriage". He is not known to have held any medical degrees and his professions are named at different times "chemist, physician, journalist, soap boiler".

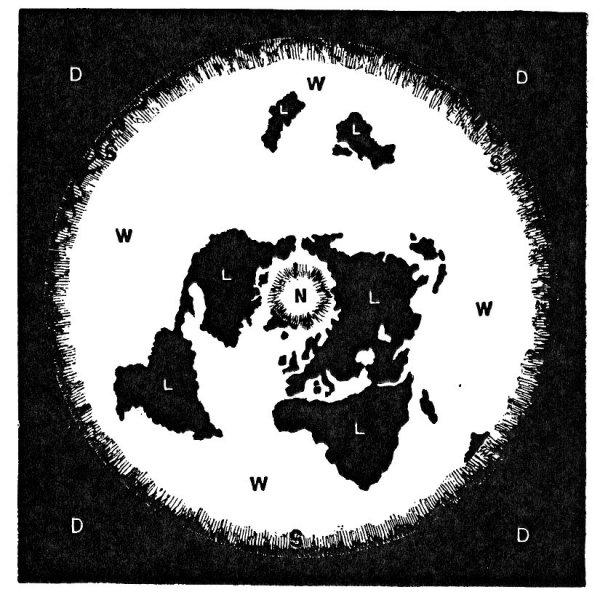
Rowbotham's flat Earth map

His book Zetetic Astronomy: The Earth not a Globe appeared in 1865. His lectures continued and concerned citizens addressed letters to the Astronomer Royal seeking rebuttals for his claims. A correspondent to the Leeds Times observed that "One thing he did demonstrate was that scientific dabblers unused to platform advocacy are unable to cope with a man, a charlatan if you will (but clever and thoroughly up in his theory), thoroughly alive to the weakness of his opponents".

In the middle of the 1870s, Rowbotham gradually began to wind down his flat Earth advocacy in favour of his medical practice, operating from a 12-roomed house in North London, and the lucrative sale of his patent medicine Dr. Birley's Syrup of Free Phosphorus, which purported to aid longevity and cure diseases of all kinds. Several of his followers, including John Hampden and William Carpenter, also helped sell Rowbotham's patent medicine. In 1883, Rowbotham was made president of the Zetetic Society, an organisation based around his flat-earth beliefs.

Samuel Rowbotham died on 23 December 1884 due to complications which had arisen after he had fallen from a carriage.

== Influence ==
One of Rowbotham's followers, John Hampden, a Christian polemicist, gained notoriety by engaging in raucous public debates with leading scientists of the day. A bet involving the prominent naturalist Alfred Russel Wallace in the famous Bedford Level experiment led to several lawsuits for fraud and libel and Hampden's imprisonment.

In the United States, Rowbotham's ideas were taken up by the Christian Catholic Apostolic Church in 1914, and were promoted widely when the church added a radio station in 1923. His work in the United States was continued by William Carpenter. Carpenter, a printer originally from Greenwich, England, a supporter of Rowbotham and published Theoretical Astronomy Examined and Exposed — Proving the Earth not a Globe in eight parts from 1864 under the name Common Sense. He later emigrated to Baltimore where he published A Hundred Proofs the Earth is not a Globe in 1885.

== Legacy ==
After Rowbotham's death, Lady Elizabeth Blount founded the Universal Zetetic Society in 1893, a continuation of the Zetetic Society founded by Rowbotham in 1883. The Society published a magazine entitled The Earth Not a Globe Review and remained active well into the early part of the 20th century. After World War I, the movement underwent a slow decline, but it was revived in 1956 as The Flat Earth Society.

== See also ==
- Figure of the Earth
- Geodesy
- Hollow Earth
- Lady Elizabeth Blount
- Mark Sargent
- Modern flat Earth beliefs
- Samuel Shenton
- Empirical evidence for the spherical shape of Earth
- Wilbur Glenn Voliva

== Bibliography ==
- Garwood, Christine (2007). Flat Earth: The History of an Infamous Idea. Macmillan. ISBN 978-0-330-43289-4.
- Schadewald, Bob; Schadewald, Wendy S. (2015). The Plane Truth.
