= Zetetic Astronomy: The Earth not a Globe =

1865 book by Samuel Rowbotham

Zetetic Astronomy: The Earth not a Globe is a book published by Samuel Rowbotham in 1865. It is considered one of the foundational works of the modern-day flat Earth movement, containing the sum of Rowbotham's ideas on the subject.

== Content ==
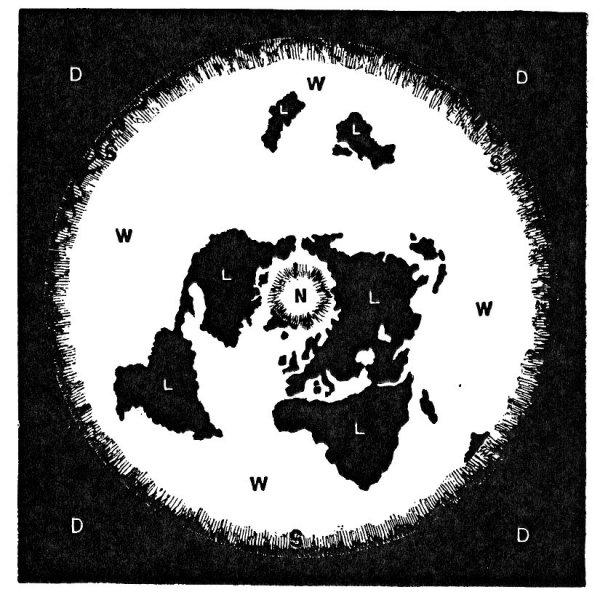
Map of the Earth according to Zetetic Astronomy, 1881

In his book, Rowbotham expanded his ideas from his 1849 pamphlet Zetetic Astronomy and proposed that Earth is a flat disc centred at the North Pole and bounded along its southern edge by a wall of ice, Antarctica. Rowbotham further held that the Sun and Moon were 3,000 miles (4,800 km) above Earth and that the "cosmos" was 3,100 miles (5,000 km) above Earth.

== See also ==
- Bedford Level experiment

== Sources ==
- Garwood, Christine (2007). Flat Earth: The History of an Infamous Idea. Pan Books. ISBN 1-4050-4702-X.
- Schadewald, Bob; Schadewald, Wendy S. (2015). The Plane Truth.
