= In Search of the Edge =

1990 film

- Directed by: Scott Barrie
- Produced by: Scott Barrie
- Narrated by: Robert Marsh
- Production company: Pancake Productions
- Distributed by: Bullfrog Films
- Release date: 1990
- Running time: 26 minutes
- Country: Canada
- Language: English

In Search of the Edge is a Canadian short documentary film, directed by Scott Barrie and released in 1990. Conceived in part as an educational film on media literacy and critical thinking skills, the film is a mockumentary that aims to debunk flat earth theory by presenting it as if it were true, thus exposing its contradictions and absurdities. It is based in part on the story of Andrea Barnes, a fictional scientist who purportedly disappeared in Antarctica while searching for the edge of the earth, and is claimed by the film's participants to have fallen off the edge.

The film received a Genie Award nomination for Best Short Documentary at the 12th Genie Awards in 1991.
