= Bedford Level experiment =

Experiment to determine the shape of the Earth

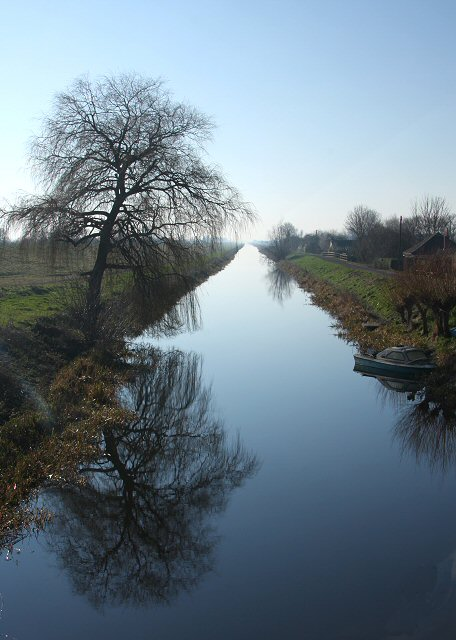
The Old Bedford River, photographed from the bridge at Welney, Norfolk (2008); the camera is looking downstream, south-west of the bridge

The Bedford Level experiment was a series of observations carried out along a 6-mile (10 km) length of the Old Bedford River on the Bedford Level of the Cambridgeshire Fens in the United Kingdom. They were performed during the 19th and early 20th centuries to deny the curvature of the Earth through measurement.

Samuel Birley Rowbotham, who conducted the first observations starting in 1838, claimed that he had proven the Earth to be flat. However, in 1870, after adjusting Rowbotham's method to allow for the effects of atmospheric refraction, Alfred Russel Wallace found a curvature consistent with a spherical Earth.

== The Bedford Level ==
At the point chosen for all the experiments, the river is a slow-flowing drainage canal running in an uninterrupted straight line for a 6-mile (10 km) stretch to the north-east of the village of Welney. This makes it an ideal location to directly measure the curvature of the Earth, as Rowbotham wrote in Zetetic Astronomy:

If the earth is a globe, and is 25,000 English statute miles in circumference, the surface of all standing water must have a certain degree of convexity—every part must be an arc of a circle. From the summit of any such arc there will exist a curvature or declination of 8 inches in the first statute mile. In the second mile the fall will be 32 inches; in the third mile, 72 inches, or 6 feet, as shown in the following diagram:

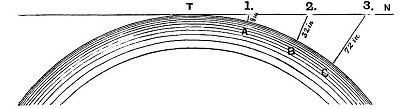
Earth's rate of curvature as shown in Zetetic Astronomy. Vertical exaggeration 1000×.

...[A]fter the first few miles the curvature would be so great that no difficulty could exist in detecting either its actual existence or its proportion... In the county of Cambridge there is an artificial river or canal, called the "Old Bedford". It is upwards of twenty miles in length, and ... passes in a straight line through that part of the Fens called the "Bedford Level". The water is nearly stationary—often completely so, and throughout its entire length has no interruption from locks or water-gates of any kind; so that it is, in every respect, well adapted for ascertaining whether any or what amount of convexity really exists.

== Experiments ==
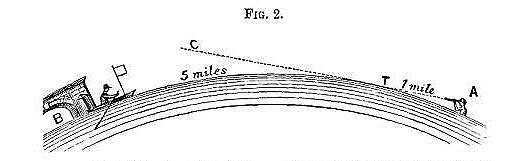
Diagram of Rowbotham's experiment on the Bedford Level, taken from his book "Earth not a globe"

The first experiment at this site was conducted by Rowbotham in the summer of 1838. He waded into the river and used a telescope held 8 inches (20 cm) above the water to watch a boat, with a flag on its mast 3 feet (0.9 m) above the water, row slowly away from him. He reported that the vessel remained constantly in his view for the full 6 miles (10 km) to Welney Bridge, whereas, had the water surface been curved with the accepted circumference of a spherical Earth, the top of the mast should have been about 11 feet (3.4 m) below his line of sight. He published this observation using the pseudonym Parallax in 1849 and subsequently expanded it into a book, Earth Not a Globe published in 1865.

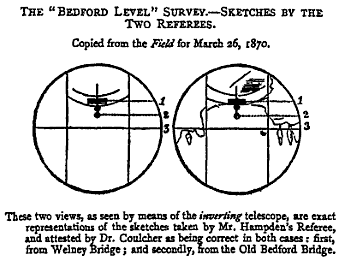
The view through Wallace's level as reproduced in his autobiography

Rowbotham repeated his experiments several times over the years, but his claims received little attention until, in 1870, a supporter by the name of John Hampden offered a wager that he could show, by repeating Rowbotham's experiment, that the Earth was flat. The naturalist and qualified surveyor Alfred Russel Wallace accepted the wager. Wallace, by virtue of his surveyor's training and knowledge of physics, avoided the errors of the preceding experiments and won the bet. The crucial steps were:

1. To set a sight line 13 feet (4.0 m) above the water, and thereby reduce the effects of atmospheric refraction.
2. To add a pole in the middle of the length of the canal that could be used to see the "bump" caused by the curvature of the Earth between the two end points.

Despite Hampden initially refusing to accept the demonstration, Wallace was awarded the bet by the referee, John Henry Walsh, editor of The Field sports magazine. Hampden subsequently published a pamphlet alleging that Wallace had cheated, and sued for his money. Several protracted court cases ensued, with the result that Hampden was imprisoned for threatening to kill Wallace and for libel.

The same court ruled that the wager had been invalid because Hampden retracted the bet and required that Wallace return the money to Hampden. Wallace, who had been unaware of Rowbotham's earlier experiments, was criticized by his peers for "his 'injudicious' involvement in a bet to 'decide' the most fundamental and established of scientific facts".

In 1901, Henry Yule Oldham, a reader in geography at King's College, Cambridge, reproduced Wallace's results using three poles fixed at equal height above water level. When viewed through a theodolite, the middle pole was found to be about 6 feet (1.8 m) higher than the poles at each end. This version of the experiment was taught in schools in England until photographs of the Earth from space became available, and it remains in the syllabus for the Indian Certificate of Secondary Education for 2023.

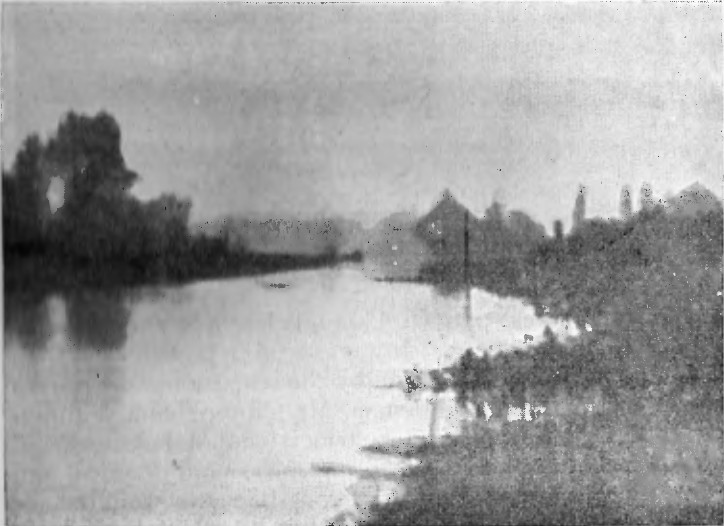
Clifton's photograph: The pale patch (centre) represents the bridge with some trees behind it. The small, square dots are the sheet and its reflection in the water.

On 11 May 1904 Lady Elizabeth Anne Blount, who was later influential in the formation of the Flat Earth Society, hired a commercial photographer to use a telephoto-lens camera to take a picture from Welney of a large white sheet she had placed, the bottom edge near the surface of the river, at Rowbotham's original position 6 miles (10 km) away. The photographer, Edgar Clifton from Dallmeyer's studio, mounted his camera 2 feet (0.6 m) above the water at Welney and was surprised to be able to obtain a picture of the target, which he believed should have been invisible to him, given the low mounting point of the camera. Lady Blount published the pictures far and wide.

These controversies became a regular feature in the English Mechanic magazine in 1904–05, which published Blount's photo and reported two experiments in 1905 that showed the opposite results. One of these, by Clement Stretton conducted on the Ashby Canal, mounted a theodolite on the canal bank aligned with the cabin roof of a boat. When the boat had moved one mile distant, the instrument showed a dip from the sight-line of about eight inches.

== Refraction ==
Atmospheric refraction can produce the results noted by Rowbotham and Blount. Because the density of air in the Earth's atmosphere decreases with height above the Earth's surface, all light rays travelling nearly horizontally bend downward, so that the line of sight is a curve. This phenomenon is routinely accounted for in levelling and celestial navigation.

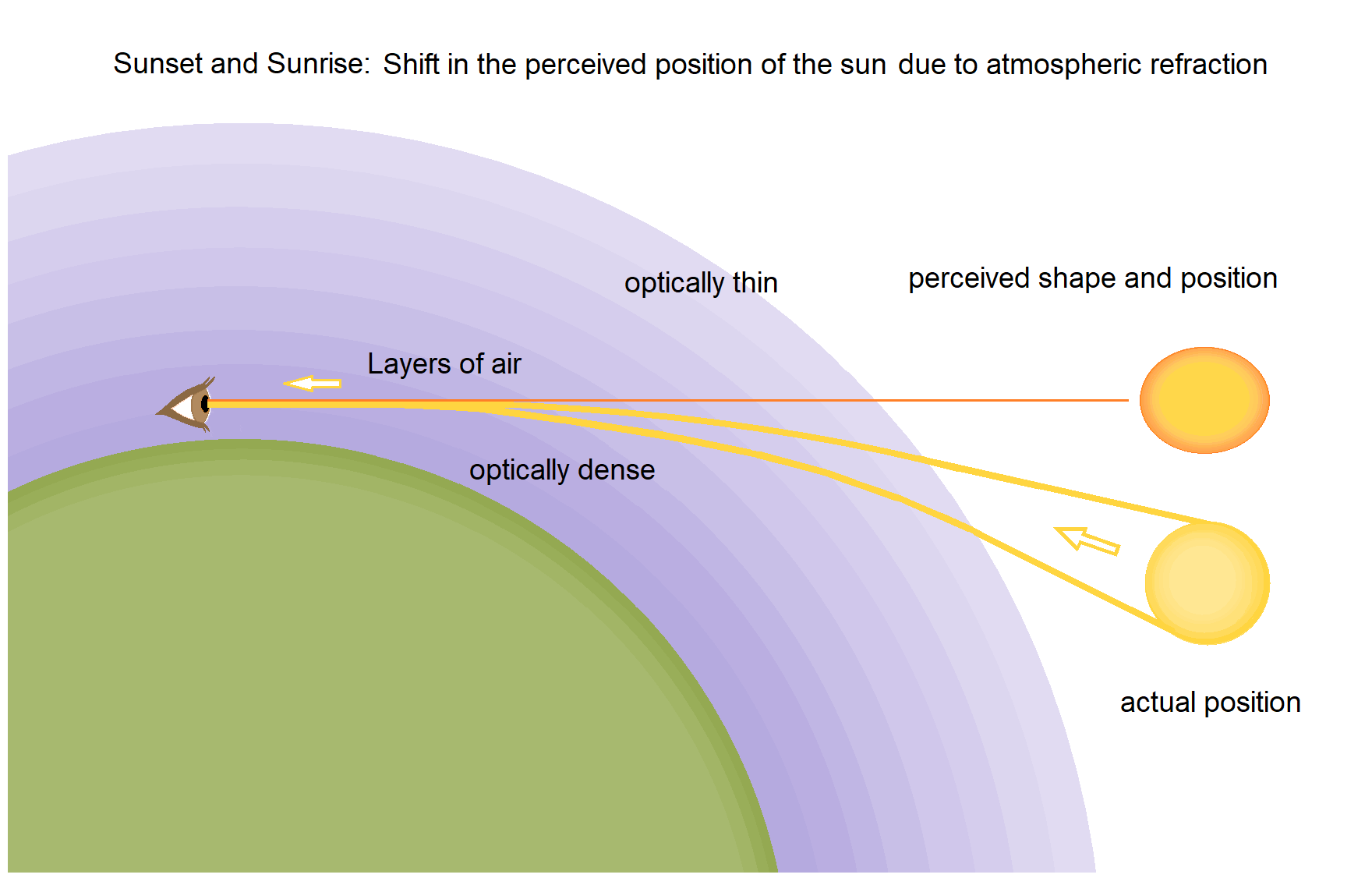
Atmospheric refraction causing an object below the horizon to be visible

If the measurement is close enough to the surface, this downward curve may match the mean curvature of the Earth's surface. In this case, the two effects of assumed curvature and refraction could cancel each other out, and the Earth will then appear flat in optical experiments.

This would have been aided, on each occasion, by a temperature inversion in the atmosphere with temperature increasing with altitude above the canal, similar to the phenomenon of the superior image mirage. Temperature inversions like this are common. An increase in air temperature or lapse rate of 0.11 Celsius degrees per metre of altitude would create an illusion of a flat canal, and all optical measurements made near ground level would be consistent with a completely flat surface. If the lapse rate were higher than this (temperature increasing with height at a greater rate), all optical observations would be consistent with a concave surface, a "bowl-shaped Earth". Under average conditions, optical measurements are consistent with a spherical Earth approximately 15% less curved than in reality. Repetition of the atmospheric conditions required for each of the many observations is not unlikely, and warm days over still water can produce favourable conditions.

== Similar experiments conducted elsewhere ==
On 25 July 1896, Ulysses Grant Morrow, a newspaper editor, conducted a similar experiment on the Old Illinois Drainage Canal, Summit, Illinois. Unlike Rowbotham, he was seeking to demonstrate that the surface of the Earth was curved: when he too found that his target marker, 18 inches (46 cm) above water level and 5 miles (8 km) distant, was clearly visible, he concluded that the Earth's surface was concavely curved, in line with the expectations of his sponsors, the Koreshan Unity society. The findings were dismissed by critics as the result of atmospheric refraction.

== See also ==
- History of geodesy
- The Final Experiment (expedition)
