= Wilbur Glenn Voliva =

American cult leader and Flat Earth theorist (1870–1942)

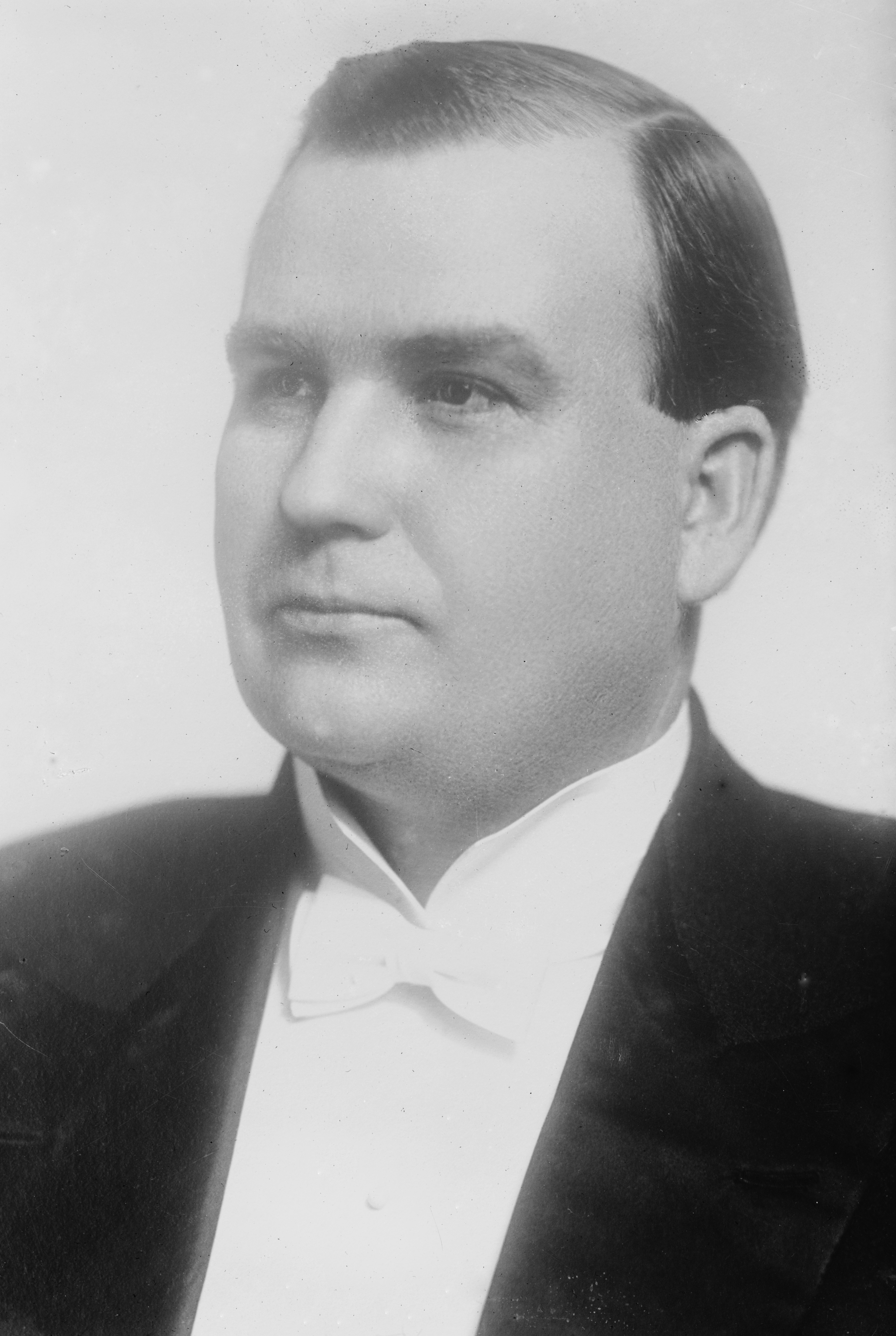
- Wilbur Glenn Voliva in 1924
- Installed: February 1906
- Term ended: October 1942

Personal details
- Born: March 10, 1870 Indiana
- Died: October 11, 1942 (aged 72) Billings Memorial Hospital, Chicago, Illinois
- Denomination: Christian Catholic Apostolic Church
- Residence: Zion, Illinois
- Spouse: Mary Mollie Steele (m. 1892; died 1915) Ida Ruby Emanuelson (m. 1916)
- Children: 2
- Education: Hiram College

Wilbur Glenn Voliva (March 10, 1870 – October 11, 1942) was an American cult leader and Flat Earth theorist who controlled the town of Zion, Illinois, during the early 20th century.

== Early life and education ==
Voliva was born on a farm in Indiana on March 10, 1870. In 1897, he graduated from Hiram College in Ohio with a degree in divinity, and became a minister in Washington Court House. In late 1898 he had considered abandoning his ministry in favor of a legal career, but was handed a copy of Leaves of Healing, a periodical ran by faith healer John Alexander Dowie and became drawn to his teachings. The next year, Voliva left his church in Ohio and traveled to Chicago to join his congregation, becoming an elder of the Christian Catholic Church in April 1899 and being made head of the North Side branch of the church. After engaging in proselytizing work for the church in Chicago and Cincinnati, in 1901 he emigrated to Australia to become overseer-in-charge of the Christian Catholic Church's Australian branch.

== Leadership of church ==
In September 1905, Dowie suffered a stroke while preaching to his congregation and left for Jamaica to recuperate, claiming US$2,000 (equivalent to $71,667 in 2025) a month in expenses from his followers, and asked Voliva to return to oversee the city of Zion in his absence. Voliva arrived in Zion in February 1906, and discovered that Dowie's extravagant lifestyle, including spending more than US$75,000 (equivalent to $2,687,500 in 2025) on a Chicago townhouse, had left Zion essentially bankrupt. Voliva began writing articles in Leaves of Healing slamming Dowie's corruption and accusing him of polygamy, claiming to have discovered a secret harem in Dowie's US$90,000 (equivalent to $3,225,000 in 2025) Zion mansion and obtaining letters from his wife revealing Dowie planned to leave her for a Swiss woman thirty years younger than him. After a year-long legal battle, Voliva seized control of Zion and was chosen as head of the church, which he then renamed to the "Christian Catholic Apostolic Church."

Voliva first sought to rescue Zion, which had gone into receivership in 1907, from bankruptcy, which he accomplished through a combination of austerity measures and exhorting his followers to donate their possessions to the church. He sought to extend his power in Zion through the Theocratic Party, composed of followers of Voliva, which was opposed by the Independent faction of generally more liberal members of other Christian denominations. In 1909, after a contentious campaign during which Voliva had labeled the Independents "the Devil's Ticket", who supported "free theatre", doctors, and dancing among other perceived evils, the Independents won that year's municipal elections. In response, Voliva accused the Independents of voter fraud and threatened to use violence to remain in office, but was forced to relinquish control after 300 Independents, led by the Independent mayor-elect, stormed Zion's city hall. Voliva was nevertheless quickly able to restore his powers by buying back city property from the state property receivership, and by 1910 he had been able to buy back the city's entire estate. The Theocratic Party frequently used political fraud to remain in power, once nominating a Republican ticket at the behest of Voliva without the knowledge of the state party.

Once in power, Voliva kept tight control on some 6,000 followers who made up the community, even up to the point of dictating their choice of marriage partners. The city of Zion was effectively controlled by the church; all of its real estate, while sold at market rates, was conveyed under an 1,100-year lease, subject to many restrictions and to termination at the whim of the General Overseer. Any citizen who left the church stood the risk of social exclusion as well as severe financial loss, as Voliva owned most businesses in Zion.

Religions other than the Christian Catholic Apostolic Church were effectively banned – visiting preachers from rival sects were harassed and hounded out of town by the city's 800-men police force, named the Zion Guard, who carried Bibles in their holsters. Voliva publicly attacked the independent denominations in Zion in speeches and on billboards as "monkey houses" and "spiritual whorehouses" and referred to one independent preacher as "little Grinny Granny Goodwin", as well as a "little pimp" and a "pukescooper". Children from independent families were banned from Zion's schools as well as its parks, which were owned personally by Voliva.

Voliva diversified Zion Industries, an industrial concern owned by the church that manufactured Scottish lace, to include a bakery which produced the popular Zion brand fig bar cookies and White Dove chocolates. Zion was a company town, its workers were paid substandard wages and were encouraged to donate 10% of their wages to the church.

As General Overseer of Zion, Voliva introduced many new rules for its residents. Movie theaters, dancing, chewing gum, driving faster than five miles per hour were all banned, and on Sunday any leisure activities including whistling or newspaper reading were prohibited as well. Women's clothing was subject to particularly strict regulation, with various types of "immodest" clothing, make-up, high heels and bathing suits all being prohibited. All women and girls from the age of 12 were required by law to keep their shoulders covered. While intoxicants of all kinds including alcohol were banned in Zion, Voliva was a particularly vociferous opponent of tobacco. Throughout the 1920s, he launched several national campaigns opposing smoking. The Zion Guard would regularly board any incoming trains to arrest any smoking passengers.

Notices were placed around the town with stern warnings that the Independents resented and often burned. As Voliva's followers became increasingly marginalized in the outside world, the city was established as a safe space for members of the Christian Catholic Apostolic Church, with any incursion by outsiders seen as a religious attack.

== Flat Earth and other views ==
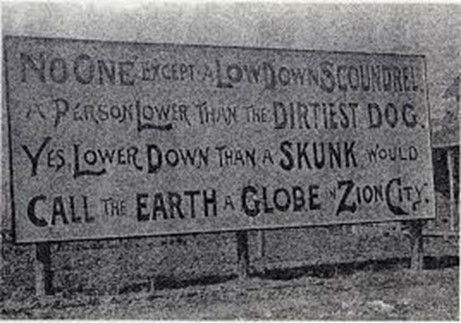
Flat Earth sign by Voliva

From 1914, Voliva gained nationwide notoriety by his vigorous advocacy of the flat Earth doctrine, holding a sermon where he introduced his congregation to the idea. That year, he had ordered one of his subordinates, Anton Darms, to search the Bible for verses proving the Earth was flat, which he published in Leaves of Healing in 1916. Darms was also put in charge of the city's church-run school system, where he mandated the teaching of the flat earth.

He offered a widely publicized $5,000 challenge for anyone to disprove the flat Earth theory, but due to what Voliva saw as the "appalling ignorance" of any challengers he never paid out anything. In 1923 Voliva became the first evangelical preacher in the world to own his own radio station, WCBD, which could be heard as far away as Central America. His radio station broadcast his diatribes against round Earth astronomy, and the evils of evolution. He was quoted about the Sun as follows:

The idea of a sun millions of miles in diameter and 91,000,000 miles [146,000,000 km] away is silly. The sun is only 32 miles [51 km] across and not more than 3,000 miles [4,800 km] from the earth. It stands to reason it must be so. God made the sun to light the earth, and therefore must have placed it close to the task it was designed to do. What would you think of a man who built a house in Zion and put the lamp to light it in Kenosha, Wisconsin?

He became increasingly focused on destroying the 'trinity of evils': modern astronomy, evolution and higher criticism, insisting on a strict interpretation of 24-hour days for creation and travelling to Dayton, Tennessee to appear as a witness at the Scopes trial, even hinting at one point he intended to run for president alongside William Jennings Bryan to fight the "twin evils" of evolution and the globe, despite the fact that he was not called to testify. He undertook several extended journeys to foreign countries in the late 1920s and early 1930s to spread his ideas. Voliva also predicted the end of the world would come in 1923, 1927, 1930, 1934 and 1935.

== Decline and death ==
Like his predecessor, Voliva increasingly developed an overtly lavish lifestyle, amassing a US$5,000,000 (equivalent to $92,672,414 in 2025) personal fortune through his ownership of Zion Industries by 1927. In the 1920s, Voliva and his financial activities had been investigated by the Illinois General Assembly, which had unsuccessfully sought his prosecution. This began to alienate his followers, especially after the hardships brought on by the Great Depression which forced Zion Industries into bankruptcy. In 1935 Voliva tried to revive the flagging fortunes of the church by instituting the annual Zion Passion Play, along the lines of the famous one in Oberammergau. However, in 1937, a disgruntled employee set ablaze the church's huge Shiloh Tabernacle where the play took place. Shortly thereafter, Voliva was forced into personal bankruptcy and he was reduced to being the honorary president of Zion Industries. The governance of the city reverted to the independents and the new authorities selected a globe for the compulsory car sticker that Voliva was forced to put on his car.

Voliva spent most of his time in Florida where he hoped to establish another religious colony, but after being diagnosed with terminal cancer, Voliva made a tearful public confession to his followers that he had misappropriated church funds for his personal use and committed other misdeeds. He died shortly thereafter on October 11, 1942 (though he had previously stated that he would live to 120 due to his diet of Brazil nuts and buttermilk), and the church all but dissolved. A small remnant was reorganized under the leadership of Michael Mintern. It was later renamed "Christ Community Church."
