= 1096 =

1096 in various calendars
- Gregorian calendar: 1096; MXCVI
- Ab urbe condita: 1849
- Armenian calendar: 545; ԹՎ ՇԽԵ
- Assyrian calendar: 5846
- Balinese saka calendar: 1017–1018
- Bengali calendar: 502–503
- Berber calendar: 2046
- English Regnal year: 9 Will. 2 – 10 Will. 2
- Buddhist calendar: 1640
- Burmese calendar: 458
- Byzantine calendar: 6604–6605
- Chinese calendar: 乙亥年 (Wood Pig); 3793 or 3586 — to — 丙子年 (Fire Rat); 3794 or 3587
- Coptic calendar: 812–813
- Discordian calendar: 2262
- Ethiopian calendar: 1088–1089
- Hebrew calendar: 4856–4857
- Hindu calendars
- Vikram Samvat: 1152–1153
- Shaka Samvat: 1017–1018
- Kali Yuga: 4196–4197
- Holocene calendar: 11096
- Igbo calendar: 96–97
- Iranian calendar: 474–475
- Islamic calendar: 488–490
- Japanese calendar: Kahō 3 / Eichō 1 (永長元年)
- Javanese calendar: 1000–1001
- Julian calendar: 1096; MXCVI
- Korean calendar: 3429
- Minguo calendar: 816 before ROC 民前816年
- Nanakshahi calendar: −372
- Seleucid era: 1407/1408 AG
- Thai solar calendar: 1638–1639
- Tibetan calendar: ཤིང་མོ་ཕག་ལོ་ (female Wood-Boar); 1222 or 841 or 69 — to — མེ་ཕོ་བྱི་བ་ལོ་ (male Fire-Rat); 1223 or 842 or 70

The University of Oxford is established.

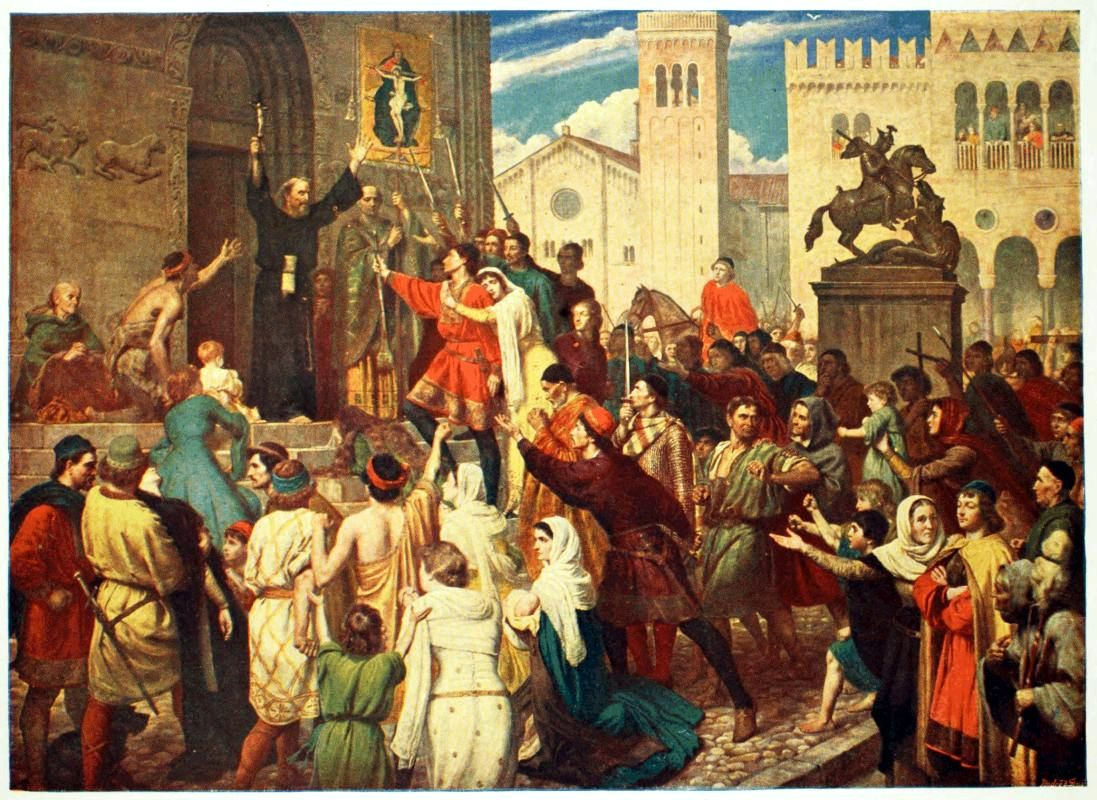
Peter the Hermit preaching in Cologne, to gather followers for the People's Crusade.

Year 1096 (MXCVI) was a leap year starting on Tuesday of the Julian calendar.

== Events ==
=== By place ===
==== First Crusade ====
- Spring – Peter the Hermit begins his preaching of the First Crusade, traveling from Berry (in central France) across Champagne, and down the Meuse Valley to Cologne (modern Germany). He gathers the People's Crusade (some 40,000 supporters), which departs about April 20. Peter's speeches appeal not only to nobles and knights, but also laborers, tradesmen and peasants (among them are former brigands and criminals).
- May – The People's Crusade, under Peter the Hermit, arrives at Sopron. Coloman, King of Hungary ("the Learned"), gives them permission to pass through Hungary, and to use the markets. Peter and his followers (some 20,000 men and women) travel from Budapest southwards supported by knights, while lumbering wagons carry stores and a chest of money that he has collected for the journey.
- May – The Rhineland massacres: Members of the People's Crusade led by Count Emicho destroy most of the Jewish communities along the Rhine in a series of large pogroms in France and Germany. Thousands of Jews are massacred, driven to suicide or forced to convert to Christianity. Estimates of the number of Jewish men, women and children murdered are 2,000 to 12,000.
- May 8 – French members of the People's Crusade led by Walter Sans Avoir enter Hungary without incident, arrive at Semlin, and cross the Sava into Byzantine at Belgrade. Meanwhile, Walter demands food but he is refused entry, and the crusaders are forced to pillage the countryside. Eventually Walter is allowed to carry on to Niš, where he is provided with food.
- May 18–26 – The Worms massacre: Members of the People's Crusade under Emicho besiege Worms in the Rhineland before killing at least 800 Jews, despite the intervention of Bishop Adalbert II. He tries to hide some of them in the bishop's palace; others chose to remain outside its walls. One of the victims is Minna of Worms, an influential Jew among the Christian nobility.
- May 27 – Members of the People's Crusade under Emicho massacre at least 1,000 Jews in Mainz. Archbishop Ruthard tries to hide some of them in the cellars of Mainz Cathedral but the crusaders learn of this and murder most of then. Men, women and children of all ages are slaughtered indiscriminately.
- May 30 – Members of the People's Crusade led by the priest Folkmar from Saxony persecute Jews in Prague, despite the opposition of the local Catholic hierarchy. Local citizens try to hide them in their own houses. Later the Jews manage to escape to safety in neighboring villages, but are slaughtered by the hundreds.
- June – Members of the People's Crusade under Emicho set out up the Main (river) towards Hungary. Some followers break off from Emicho's army at Mainz and travel to Metz – where many Jews are persecuted and murdered. They proceed down the Rhine, massacring the Jews at Neuss, Wevelinghofen and Xanten.
- June – The People's Crusade under Emicho is refused entry to Hungary on orders of Coloman, who sends troops to defend the bridge at Wieselburg. Emicho decides to build an alternative bridge and crosses the Danube. He besieges the fortress of Wieselburg, but is defeated and routed by the Hungarian army.
- June – Siege of Semlin: The People's Crusade led by Peter the Hermit arrives at Semlin. Hearing rumors of an attack from the Hungarian count Guz of Semlin on the rearguard, Geoffrey Burel assaults the castle, captures it by surprise, and defeats the Hungarian army. He plunders its supplies, herds and horses.
- June 26 – The People's Crusade (some 30,000 men) led by Peter the Hermit crosses the Sava (stealing boats from the local fishermen) but is attacked by Pechenegs and Hungarian forces. The citizens of Belgrade flee and the crusaders pillage and burn the city. Peter travels for seven days, and arrives at Niš.
- July – The People's Crusade led by Peter the Hermit is defeated by the Byzantine army (mostly Hungarian and Bulgar mercenaries) in battle near Niš. The crusader supply train of some 2,000 wagons and Peter's treasury chest is captured by the Byzantines. About a quarter of the People's Crusade is lost.
- July 12 – The People's Crusade led by Peter the Hermit reaches Sofia, where it meets envoys from Constantinople with orders to keep them supplied along the road. At Philippopolis the Greeks are so deeply moved by the suffering of Peter and his followers that the locals give them money, food and horses.
- August 1 – The People's Crusade led by Peter the Hermit arrives at Constantinople. He is received by Emperor Alexios I Komnenos, who gives him financial support. The crusaders commit endless thefts in the suburbs. Peter combines his forces with Walter Sans Avoir and camps outside the city.
- August 2–6 – The People's Crusade reorganizes its forces and gathers supplies. Alexios I advises Peter the Hermit to wait for reinforcements but he ignores the advice. The People's army (some 30,000 men) is transported across the Bosporus by the Byzantine fleet to Civetot (modern Turkey).
- August – Hugh "the Great", count of Vermandois (a brother of King Philip I), departs to join the First Crusade. He travels with a small army via the Alps to Rome. While sailing the Adriatic Sea from Bari to Dyrrachium his fleet is reduced by shipwreck. Hugh's own ship is stranded on the shore near Epirus.
- August – Godfrey of Bouillon, duke of Lower Lorraine, accompanied by his younger brother Baldwin, sets off to join the First Crusade (called by Pope Urban II) at the head of an army of some 40,000 men. He pledges his allegiance to Emperor Henry IV who issues an order not to harm Jewish communities.
- September – French forces (7,000 infantry and 300 knights) led by Geoffrey Burel raid around Nicaea (the capital of the Rum Seljuk Turks), plundering livestock and villages in the suburbs. They commit atrocities against local Christian peasants. Children are tortured and dismembered by the crusaders.
- September – German forces (5,000 infantry and 200 knights) led by Rainald of Breis raid the region of Nicaea. They advance eastward and assault the Seljuk garrison in the castle of Xerigordos which they manage to capture and find well stocked with provisions. The Greek Christians inside are spared.
- September 29 – Siege of Xerigordos: Sultan Kilij Arslan I sends a Seljuk expeditionary force to assault and recapture the castle of Xerigordos. They cut off the water supply, and Rainald of Breis is forced to surrender. Many of the crusaders are killed but others convert to Islam and become slaves.
- October – Robert Curthose, duke of Normandy (a brother of King William II of England), sets off to join the First Crusade. He assembles his army at Pontarlier and travels through Italy to Rome. To raise money for the Crusade Robert mortgages the Norman duchy to William, for the sum of 10,000 pennies.
- October – Raymond IV ("Saint-Gilles"), count of Toulouse, sets off to join the First Crusade. He travels with his army, accompanied by his wife Elvira and Bishop Adhemar of Le Puy, via Provence through the Balkan route (along the coast of Croatia). He arrives at Dyrrachium to march to Thessaloniki.
- October – Bohemond I, Italo-Norman prince of Taranto (the son of Duke Robert Guiscard), departs to join the First Crusade. He crosses the Adriatic Sea from Brindisi with his army (some 4,000 men), and arrives in Vorë. While traveling, Bohemond gives strict orders not to plunder Byzantine villages.
- October 21 – Battle of Civetot: The Seljuk Turks led by Kilij Arslan I defeat the People's army (20,000 men) near Nicaea. The crusaders are slaughtered, and the camp at Civetot is captured. Only children are spared and sent into slavery. Around 3,000 manage to escape back to Constantinople.
- December – The last of the four planned Crusader armies arrives at Constantinople, bringing the total numbers to 60,000 infantry and knights, though no king among the Crusaders' leaders. At this time Philip I, William II and Henry IV are all under excommunication by Urban II.
- December 25 – Godfrey of Bouillon is appointed the primary leader of the First Crusade, making it a largely French war in practice and causing the inhabitants of the Holy Land to refer to Europeans generally as "Franks". Godfrey and the other leaders agree to take an oath of loyalty to Alexios I.

==== Europe ====
- King Alfonso VI ("the Brave") of Castile arranges to marry his daughter Theresa to Henry of Burgundy (House of Burgundy). Theresa's dowry includes the County of Portugal, given to Henry with Porto as the capital.
- Reconquista: King Peter I of Aragon conquers Huesca from the Moors of the Taifa of Zaragoza. He expands his domains to the south, conquering land from Al Andalus (modern Spain). The capital is moved from Jaca to Huesca.

==== Asia ====
- Phayao, a modern-day province of Thailand, is founded as a city-state kingdom.

=== By topic ===
==== Religion ====
- February – Robert of Arbrissel founds a monastery at La Roë.
- The first documented teaching at the University of Oxford in England occurs.
- Norwich School is founded in England as an episcopal grammar school.
- In Ireland, the Diocese of Waterford is established.

== Births ==
- January 15 – Theodora Komnene, Byzantine princess
- March 12 – Canute Lavard, duke of Schleswig (d. 1131)
- April 9 – Al-Muqtafi, caliph of the Abbasid Caliphate (d. 1160)
- December 31 – Al-Amir bi-Ahkam Allah, Fatimid caliph (d. 1130)
- Ermengol VI ("el de Castilla"), count of Urgell (d. 1154)
- Galdino della Sala (or Galdinus), Archbishop of Milan (d. 1176)
- Henry of Blois, bishop of Winchester (approximate date)
- Hugh of Saint Victor, German scholar and theologian (d. 1141)
- Iziaslav II Mstislavich, Grand Prince of Kiev (d. 1154)
- Minamoto no Tameyoshi, Japanese nobleman (d. 1156)
- Peter Lombard, French bishop and theologian (d. 1160)
- Stephen of Blois, king of England (approximate date)
- Taira no Tadamori, Japanese nobleman (d. 1153)
- Wang Ximeng, Chinese landscape painter (d. 1119)
- William VI, count of Auvergne and Velay (d. 1136)

== Deaths ==
- January 2 – William de St-Calais, Norman bishop and chief councilor
- January 11 – Adelaide II, German princess and abbess (b. 1045)
- May – Worms massacre:
  - Kalonymus ben Meshullam, French Jewish martyr
  - Minna of Worms, German-Jewish female moneylender and martyr
- October 21 – Walter Sans Avoir, French leader of the First Crusade
- November 11 – Werner I, German nobleman (House of Habsburg)
- December 23 – Hugh I of Le Puiset, French nobleman
- Eudokia Makrembolitissa, Byzantine empress and regent
- Fariburz I, Persian ruler of Shirvan (House of Shirvanshah)
- Gao Shengtai, Chinese ruler of the Dazhong Kingdom
- Geoffrey III, Count of Anjou ("the Bearded"), French nobleman (b. 1040)
- Henry III, count of Luxembourg (House of Luxembourg)
- Ralph de Gael, Norman nobleman (approximate date)
- Sarakhsi, Persian scholar, jurist and writer (approximate date)
- Stephen II, German nobleman (House of Sponheim)
