= Timeline of the Seljuk Sultanate of Rum =

The timeline of the Seljuk Sultanate of Rum (1077–1307) is summarized below.

== Background ==
After the battles of Pasinler in 1048 and Malazgirt in 1071 Turks founded a number of states in Anatolia. These were the vassals of Great Seljuk Empire. In fact one of the most powerful of these vassal states had been founded by a member of Seljuk house and the name of this state was the Sultanate of Rum.

The founder of the state was Süleyman I. Paternal grandfathers of the sultan Melik Shah of Great Seljuk Empire and Suleyman I were brothers. But soon, the Seljuks of Rûm began to act independently of the Great Seljuk Empire and annexed the territories of other Turkish states in Anatolia. Their history is notable for:

- They were adversaries of the first three Crusades.
- Ottoman principality, the future Ottoman Empire emerged within their realm.

== 11th century ==
Year	Event
1071	Alp Arslan of the Great Seljuk Empire defeats Romanos IV Diogenis of the Byzantine Empire at Malazgirt, near Muş, Byzantine Armenia.
1077	Suleyman I is appointed as a governor in Seljuk possessions in Anatolia, but he acts independently and founds a state.
1081	Suleyman takes control of Nicaea (modern İznik, Bursa Province) after supporting the rebellion of Nikephoros Melissenos, making the city his capital. Suleyman then makes a treaty with Alexios Komnenos who acknowledges his reign and both decide on the river Draco as a border river. At the same time, Tzachas an independent Turkmen bey (not a member of Seljuk house, but the father in law of Kılıç Arslan I) founds a principality in Smyrna, (modern İzmir), being the first Turkmen to content for the Aegean Sea.
1084	Conquest of Antioch (modern Antakya) by Suleyman. At the same time, another Turkmen warlord named Elchanes takes control of Apollonias and Kyzikios.
1086	Suleyman I tries to add Syria to his realm, but is defeated by his cousin Tutush I in the Battle of Ain Salm, Syria. His appointed governor of Nicaea, Abu'l-Qasim, takes control of the realm and tries unsuccessfully to expand the realm but he has to content with punitive expeditions under Bozan send by the Great Seljuk Sultan Malik Shah.
1092	Kılıç Arslan I escapes prison after the death of Malik Shah in November 1092 and claims Nicaea and the sultanate from Poulchanes, the brother of Abu'l-Qasim. He reigns until his death in 1107.
1094/1095	Kılıç Arslan I murders his father-in-law Tzachas at a banquet.
1096	Kılıç Arslan I defeats Walter Sans Avoir and Peter the Hermit of People's Crusade at the battles of Xerigordon and Battle of Civetot both in Northwest Anatolia.
1097	Bohemund of Taranto, Godfrey of Bouillon and Adhemar of Le Puy of First Crusade defeat Kılıç Arslan I two times, first in a battle before Nicaea and then in the battle of Dorylaeum (near modern Eskişehir, Central Anatolia). The capital Nicaea is lost to the Byzantines who retake the city with the help of the First Crusade. A few years later, Iconium (modern Konya), becomes the new capital.
1100	Gazi Gümüshtigin, the independent bey of the Danishmend realm, defeats Bohemond I of Antioch in the battle of Melitene (Malatya).

== 12th century ==
Year	Event
1101	Kılıç Arslan I defeats Stephen of Blois and Hugh of Vermandois of the second wave of First Crusades at the Battle of Mersivan (near modern Merzifon, Amasya Province, Central Anatolia.)
1107	Kılıç Arslan conquers Musul, Iraq, but is defeated in the battle.
1110	Şahinşah (1107–1116) (also called Melikşah, not to be confused with the sultan of Great Seljuk Empire with the same name) Continuous struggle with the Crusades weakens the state.
1116	Mesut I (1116–1156) During the early years of his reign he has to accept the dominance of Danishmends a rival Turkish state in Anatolia.
1142	Mehmed of Danishmends dies and the Sultanate of Rum becomes the leading power of Anatolia for the second time.
1147	Mesut I defeats Holy Roman Emperor Conrad III of Second Crusade in the Second battle of Dorylaeum (near modern Eskişehir)
1147	Mesud I defeats French king Louis VII of Second Crusade at Laodicea (near modern Denizli, West Anatolia).
1156	Kılıç Arslan II (1156–1192)
1176	Kılıç Arslan defeats Manuel I Komnenos of Byzantine Empire in the battle of Myriokephalon
1178	Kılıç Arslan II annexes Danishmend realm. (Sivas, and the surrounding territory, Central Anatolia.)
1186	Kılıç Arslan II partitions the country into 11 provinces, each governed by one of his sons
1190	Holy Roman Emperor Frederick I Barbarossa of Third Crusade crosses West Anatolia. While main Turkish army avoids conflict, several irregular troops try to fight, but are repelled. Temporary German occupation of capital Konya.
1190	Frederick Barbarossa of Third Crusade dies near Silifke, Mersin province in South Anatolia.
1192	Keyhüsrev I (1192–1196)
1194	After the collapse of Great Seljuk Empire, the Sultanate of Rum become the sole surviving branch of Seljuks.
1196	Süleyman II (1196–1204)

== 13th century ==
Year	Event
1202	Süleyman II annexes Saltukid realm (Erzurum, and the surrounding territory, Eastern Anatolia.)
1202	Kingdom of Georgia defeats Süleyman II at the Battle of Micingerd
1204	Kılıç Arslan III (1204–1205)
1205	Keyhüsrev I (1205–1211) (second time)
1207	Capture of Antalya, access to Mediterranean Sea
1211	Keykavus I (1211–1220)
1214	Capture of Sinop, Black Sea coast
1220	Alaaddin Keykubat I (1220–1237)
1221	Capture of Alanya, Antalya province, Mediterranean coast
1223	Construction of an arsenal in Alanya, a sign of Alaaddin Keykubat's interest in maritime trade
1224	Alaaddin Keykubat annexes a part of Artuqid realm (Harput and surrounding territory .)
1227	Sudak in Crimea is captured. This is the most notable overseas campaign of Seljuks.
1228	Mongol conquests in Iran result in a flux of refugees to Anatolia, one of the refuges is Mevlana
1228	Alaaddin Keykubat I annexes Mengucek realm (Erzincan and the surrounding territory), Eastern Anatolia .
1230	Alaaddin Keykubat defeats Celaleddin Harzemşah of Harzemşah Empire in the Battle of Yassıçemen, near Erzincan
1237	Keyhüsrev II (1237–1246)
1238	Sadettin Köpek the vizier of the inexperienced sultan who has executed some members of Seljuk house and becomes the de facto ruler of the sultanate is killed.
1239	Revolt of Baba Ishak. A revolt of Turkmen (Oguz) and Harzem refugees who have recently arrived in Anatolia. The revolt is suppressed. But the sultanate loses power.
1240	Capture of Diyarbakır in Southeast Anatolia.
1243	Bayju of Mongols defeats Keyhüsrev II in the battle of Kösedağ, Eastern Anatolia. From now on, the sultanate is a vassal of Ilkhanids.
1246	Keykavus II (1246–1262) Governs together with his two brothers. But the real ruler is vizier Pervâne who has married to late sultan's widow Gürcü Hatun.
1256	Mongols defeat Seljuk Turks at the Battle of Sultanhanı, Aksaray Province, Central Anatolia.
1258	Mongols partition the country . Double sultanate
1262	Kılıç Arslan IV 1260–1266
1266	Keyhüsrev III 1266–1284
1277	Karamanoğlu Mehmet Bey, a semi independent bey, allies himself with the Mameluk sultan Baybars who invades a part of Anatolia.
1277	Karamanoğlu Mehmed Bey conquers Konya and enthrones his puppet Jimri. But Ilkhanids intervene and reestablish Keyhüsrev's reign. (During his short stay in Konya Mehmed Bey declares Turkish as the official language in his realm).
1284	Mesut II 1284–1297
1289	Seljuk-Ilkhanid coalition defeats the tribes of Germiyanids
1297	Alaaddin Kekubat III 1297–1302

== 14th century ==
Year	Event
1302	Mesut II 1302–1307 (second time)
1328	The Karamanids conquer the final holdings and put an end to the sultanate

== See also ==
- Timeline of Turks (500-1300)
- Timeline of Turkish history
