= Rainald of Broyes =

Rainald of Broyes was an Italian lord who participated in the People's Crusade as a leader in the army of Peter the Hermit. After defeat to the Seljuks in 1096, Rainald converted to Islam from Christianity.

== Life ==
After crossing the Bosphorus and pillaging homes and churches along the way to Nicodemia, Rainald took leadership of the German and Italian portion of Peter the Hermit's followers, including newly joined Italian pilgrims.

After the German-Italian army of Rainald captured the Xerigordos castle, Kilij Arslan I, the Seljuk Sultan of Rûm, ordered a large force of Turks to recapture it, with the Turkish army arriving on September 29th (St Michael's Day). Rainald sent an ambush to the Turks, but it failed. With the Turkish control of the valley below Xerigordos, the Germans were besieged within their castle. Soon they grew desperate from thirst, sucking moisture from the earth, drinking blood from the veins of their horses and donkeys, and even imbibing one another's urine; all the while, priests failed to comfort and encourage the besieged.

After eight days, Rainald surrendered, opened the gates to the enemy, and converted to Islam along with a group of his entourage. While Rainald and the fellow apostastizers survived (although sent in captivity to Antioch, Aleppo, and even as far as Khorasan), the rest were taken captives. Rainald's fate is unknown, but he likely died in captivity.

== See also ==
- List of converts to Islam
- Walter Sans Avoir
