= October 21 =

October 21 this year in various calendars
- Wednesday, 21 October 2026
Akan	Nwonawukuo
Armenian	3 Trē 1476
Aztec	Izcalli 19, 12 Malīnalli
Babylonian	8 Tashritu, 2337 SE
Balinese pawukon	Menga, Beteng, Laba, Umanis, Aryang, Buda of Dukut, Brahma, Tulus, Suka
Bengali	5 Kartik, BS 1433
Chinese	Yang Earth Dragon・Winnowing Basket Mansion; Fire Horse Year, Month 9, Day 12 (Hanlu, 2 days until Shuangjiang)
Common Era	21 October 2026 CE
Coptic	11 Paopi, AM 1743
Egyptian	8 Phamenoth, 2775 NE
Ethiopian	11 Ṭeqemt, 2019 Amätä Məhrät
French Republican	Décade III, Nonidi de Vendémiaire de l'Année 235 de la République
Gregorian	21 October, AD 2026
Hebrew	10 Cheshvan, AM 5787
Hindu	Dhaniṣṭhā・Gaṇḍa; Solar: 4 Kārtika, 1948 SE; Lunisolar: Daśamī, Śukla pakṣa of Āśvina, 2083 VE; Rāudra・5127 KY・1,872,869
Icelandic	Miðvikudagur, 28 Haustmánuður 2026
Islamic	9 Jumada al-awwal, AH 1448 (using tabular method)
ISO week date	2026-W43-3
Japanese	11 Nagatsuki, Reiwa 8 (Kanro, 2 days until Sōkō)
Julian	8 October, AD 2026 (AM 7535)
Julian day	2461335
Korean	11 Gaedal, 4359 DE
Maya	13.0.14.0.12; 5 Zac, 12 Eb
Roman	ante diem VIII Idus Octobres, MMDCCLXXIX AUC
Solar Hijri	29 Mehr, SH 1405
Tibetan	10 tha skar, me pho rta 2153 or 1772 or 1000

<<	October					>>
Su	Mo	Tu	We	Th	Fr	Sa
				1	2	3
4	5	6	7	8	9	10
11	12	13	14	15	16	17
18	19	20	21	22	23	24
25	26	27	28	29	30	31
2026

October 21 in recent years
2026 (Wednesday)
2025 (Tuesday)
2024 (Monday)
2023 (Saturday)
2022 (Friday)
2021 (Thursday)
2020 (Wednesday)
2019 (Monday)
2018 (Sunday)
2017 (Saturday)

October 21 is the 294th day of the year (295th in leap years) in the Gregorian calendar; 71 days remain until the end of the year.

== Events ==
=== Pre-1600 ===
- 310 – Sixty-five days after being exiled by the Emperor Maxentius to Sicily, Pope Eusebius dies.
- 685 – Election of Pope Conon following the death of Pope John V.
- 1094 – El Cid and his forces defeat a larger army of the Almoravids in the battle of Cuarte.
- 1096 – A Seljuk Turkish army successfully ambushes the People's Crusade at the Battle of Civetot.
- 1097 – First Crusade: Crusaders led by Godfrey of Bouillon, Bohemund of Taranto, and Raymond IV, Count of Toulouse, begin the Siege of Antioch.
- 1139 – Zengi, atabeg of Aleppo, takes Baalbek from the Burid dynasty.
- 1187 – Election of Gregory VIII following the death of Pope Urban III.
- 1392 – Japanese Emperor Go-Kameyama abdicates in favor of rival claimant Go-Komatsu.
- 1512 – Martin Luther joins the theological faculty of the University of Wittenberg.
- 1520 – João Álvares Fagundes discovers the islands of Saint Pierre and Miquelon, bestowing on them their original name of "Islands of the 11,000 Virgins".
- 1600 – Tokugawa Ieyasu defeats the leaders of rival Japanese clans in the Battle of Sekigahara and becomes shōgun of Japan.

=== 1601–1900 ===
- 1639 – A Dutch fleet under Admiral Maarten Tromp defeats a large Spanish fleet at the Battle of the Downs, dealing a heavy blow to Spanish naval power.
- 1797 – In Boston Harbor, the 44-gun United States Navy frigate USS Constitution is launched.
- 1805 – Napoleonic Wars: A British fleet led by Lord Nelson defeats a combined French and Spanish fleet under Admiral Villeneuve in the Battle of Trafalgar.
- 1824 – Portland cement is patented.
- 1854 – Florence Nightingale and a staff of 38 nurses are sent to the Crimean War.
- 1861 – American Civil War: Union forces under Colonel Edward Baker are defeated at Ball's Bluff by Confederate troops in the second major battle of the war.
- 1867 – The Medicine Lodge Treaty is signed by southern Great Plains Indian leaders. The treaty requires Native American Plains tribes to relocate to a reservation in the western Indian Territory.
- 1879 – Thomas Edison applies for a patent for his design for an incandescent light bulb.
- 1888 – The Swiss Social Democratic Party is founded.
- 1892 – Opening ceremonies for the World's Columbian Exposition are held in Chicago, though because construction was behind schedule, the exposition did not open until May 1, 1893.
- 1895 – The capitulation of Tainan completes the Japanese conquest of Taiwan.

=== 1901–present ===
- 1907 – The 1907 Qaratog earthquake hits the borders of Uzbekistan and Tajikistan, killing between 12,000 and 15,000 people.
- 1910 – HMS Niobe arrives in Halifax Harbour to become the first ship of the Royal Canadian Navy.
- 1912 – First Balkan War: The Greek navy completes the capture of the island of Lemnos for use as a forward base against the Dardanelles.
- 1921 – President Warren G. Harding delivers the first speech by a sitting U.S. president against lynching in the Deep South.
- 1931 – A secret society in the Imperial Japanese Army launches an abortive coup d'état attempt.
- 1940 – The first edition of the Ernest Hemingway novel For Whom the Bell Tolls is published.
- 1941 – World War II: The Kragujevac massacre against Serbian men and boys takes place.
- 1943 – World War II: The Provisional Government of Free India is formally established in Japanese-occupied Singapore.
- 1944 – World War II: The first kamikaze attack damages HMAS Australia as the Battle of Leyte Gulf begins.
- 1944 – World War II: The Nemmersdorf massacre against German civilians takes place.
- 1944 – World War II: The city of Aachen falls to American forces after three weeks of fighting, the first German city to fall to the Allies.
- 1945 – In the 1945 French legislative election French women vote for the first time.
- 1950 – Korean War: Heavy fighting begins between British and Australian forces and North Koreans during the Battle of Yongju.
- 1956 – The Mau Mau Uprising in Kenya is defeated.
- 1959 – In New York City, the Solomon R. Guggenheim Museum opens to the public.
- 1959 – President Dwight D. Eisenhower approves the transfer of all US Army space-related activities to NASA, including most of the Army Ballistic Missile Agency.
- 1965 – Comet Ikeya–Seki approaches perihelion, passing 450,000 kilometers (279,617 miles) from the sun.
- 1966 – A colliery spoil tip slips onto houses and a school in the village of Aberfan in Wales, killing 144 people, 116 of whom were schoolchildren.
- 1967 – The National Mobilization Committee to End the War in Vietnam organizes a march of fifty thousand people from the Lincoln Memorial to the Pentagon.
- 1969 – The 1969 Somali coup d'état establishes a Marxist–Leninist administration.
- 1971 – A gas explosion kills 22 people at a shopping centre near Glasgow, Scotland.
- 1973 – Fred Dryer of the Los Angeles Rams becomes the first player in NFL history to score two safeties in the same game.
- 1978 – Australian civilian pilot Frederick Valentich vanishes over the Bass Strait south of Melbourne, after reporting contact with an unidentified aircraft.
- 1979 – Moshe Dayan resigns from the Israeli government because of strong disagreements with Prime Minister Menachem Begin over policy towards the Arabs.
- 1981 – Andreas Papandreou becomes Prime Minister of Greece, ending an almost 50-year-long system of power dominated by conservative forces.
- 1983 – The metre is defined as the distance light travels in a vacuum in 1/299,792,458 of a second.
- 1984 – Niki Lauda claims his third and final Formula One Drivers' Championship Title by half a point ahead of McLaren team-mate Alain Prost at the Portuguese Grand Prix.
- 1986 – In Lebanon, pro-Iran kidnappers claim to have abducted American writer Edward Tracy (he is released in August 1991).
- 1987 – The Jaffna hospital massacre is carried out by Indian peacekeeping forces in Sri Lanka, killing 70 Tamil patients, doctors and nurses.
- 1989 – In Honduras, 131 people are killed when a Boeing 727 crashes on approach to Toncontín International Airport near the nation's capital Tegucigalpa.
- 1994 – North Korea and the United States sign an Agreed Framework that requires North Korea to stop its nuclear weapons program and agree to inspections.
- 1994 – In Seoul, South Korea, 32 people are killed when a span of the Seongsu Bridge collapses.
- 2003 – Images of the dwarf planet Eris are taken and subsequently used in documenting its discovery.
- 2007 – Finnish driver Kimi Räikkönen of Scuderia Ferrari won the Brazilian Grand Prix in Formula One. With this result, Räikkönen became world champion, surpassing McLaren drivers Lewis Hamilton and Fernando Alonso by one point in the drivers' standings.
- 2011 – Iraq War: President Barack Obama announces that the withdrawal of United States troops from Iraq will be complete by the end of the year.
- 2018 – A passenger train derails in Yilan County, Taiwan, killing 18 people and injuring 187.
- 2019 – Thirty people are killed in a fiery bus crash in western Democratic Republic of the Congo.
- 2019 – In Canada, the 2019 Canadian federal election ends, resulting in incumbent Prime Minister Justin Trudeau remaining in office, albeit with the Liberal Party in a minority government.
- 2021 – A shooting occurs on the set of the film Rust, in which actor Alec Baldwin discharged a prop weapon which had been loaded, killing the director of photography, Halyna Hutchins, and injuring director Joel Souza.

== Births ==
=== Pre-1600 ===
- 1328 – Hongwu Emperor of China (died 1398)
- 1409 – Alessandro Sforza, Italian condottiero (died 1473)
- 1449 – George Plantagenet, 1st Duke of Clarence, Irish-English son of Cecily Neville, Duchess of York (died 1478)
- 1527 – Louis I, Cardinal of Guise (died 1578)
- 1536 – Joachim Ernest, Prince of Anhalt (died 1586)
- 1581 – Domenichino, Italian painter (died 1641)

=== 1601–1900 ===
- 1650 – Jean Bart, French admiral (died 1702)
- 1658 – Henri de Boulainvilliers, French nobleman (died 1722)
- 1675 – Emperor Higashiyama of Japan (died 1710)
- 1687 – Nicolaus I Bernoulli, Swiss mathematician and theorist (died 1759)
- 1712 – James Steuart, Scottish economist and author (died 1780)
- 1725 – Franz Moritz von Lacy, Austrian field marshal (died 1801)
- 1757 – Pierre Augereau, French general (died 1816)
- 1762 – Herman Willem Daendels, Dutch general, lawyer, and politician, 36th Governor-General of the Dutch East Indies (died 1818)
- 1772 – Samuel Taylor Coleridge, English poet, philosopher, and critic (died 1834)
- 1775 – Giuseppe Baini, Italian priest, composer, and critic (died 1844)
- 1790 – Alphonse de Lamartine, French poet and politician, French Head of State (died 1869)
- 1809 – James Clark, American Jesuit (died 1885)
- 1811 – Filippo Colini, Italian operatic baritone (died 1863)
- 1821 – Sims Reeves, English tenor and actor (died 1900)
- 1833 – Alfred Nobel, Swedish chemist and engineer, invented dynamite and founded the Nobel Prize (died 1896)
- 1845 – Will Carleton, American poet and journalist (died 1912)
- 1847 – Giuseppe Giacosa, Italian poet and playwright (died 1906)
- 1851 – George Ulyett, English cricketer and footballer (died 1898)
- 1868 – Ernest Swinton, British Army officer (died 1951)
- 1874 – Tan Kah Kee, Chinese businessman, community leader, communist and philanthropist (died 1961)
- 1877 – Oswald Avery, Canadian-American physician and microbiologist (died 1955)
- 1884 – Claire Waldoff, German singer and actress (died 1957)
- 1886 – Eugene Burton Ely, American soldier and pilot (died 1911)
- 1887 – Krishna Singh, Indian lawyer and politician, 1st Chief Minister of Bihar (died 1961)
- 1894 – Edogawa Ranpo, Japanese author and critic (died 1965)
- 1895 – Paavo Johansson, Finnish javelin thrower and decathlete (died 1983)
- 1895 – Edna Purviance, American actress (died 1958)
- 1896 – Esther Shumiatcher-Hirschbein, Russian-Canadian poet and screenwriter (died 1985)
- 1898 – Eduard Pütsep, Estonian wrestler and actor (died 1960)
- 1900 – Andrée Boisson, French Olympic fencer (died 1973)

=== 1901–present ===
- 1902 – Eddy Hamel, American footballer (died 1943)
- 1907 – Nikos Engonopoulos, Greek painter and poet (died 1985)
- 1908 – Niyazi Berkes, Cypriot-English sociologist and academic (died 1988)
- 1911 – Mary Blair, American illustrator and animator (died 1978)
- 1912 – Don Byas, American saxophonist and educator (died 1972)
- 1912 – Alfredo Pián, Argentine race car driver (died 1990)
- 1912 – Georg Solti, Hungarian-English conductor and director (died 1997)
- 1914 – Martin Gardner, American mathematician and author (died 2010)
- 1915 – Owen Bradley, American country music record producer (died 1998)
- 1917 – Dizzy Gillespie, American trumpet player, composer, and bandleader (died 1993)
- 1918 – Milton Himmelfarb, American sociologist and author (died 2006)
- 1918 – Albertina Sisulu, South African anti-apartheid activist (died 2011)
- 1919 – Jim Wallwork, English-Canadian sergeant and pilot (died 2013)
- 1921 – Malcolm Arnold, English composer (died 2006)
- 1921 – Bruce Beeby, Australian-English actor (died 2013)
- 1921 – Robert Clothier, Canadian actor (died 1999)
- 1921 – Jim Shumate, American fiddler and composer (died 2013)
- 1921 – Ingrid van Houten-Groeneveld, Dutch astronomer and academic (died 2015)
- 1922 – Liliane Bettencourt, French businesswoman and philanthropist (died 2017)
- 1923 – Samuel Khachikian, Iranian director, screenwriter, and author (died 2001)
- 1924 – Joyce Randolph, American actress (died 2024)
- 1924 – Julie Wilson, American actress and singer (died 2015)
- 1925 – Celia Cruz, Cuban-American singer (died 2003)
- 1925 – Louis Robichaud, Canadian Premier of New Brunswick (died 2005)
- 1925 – Virginia Zeani, Romanian soprano and educator (died 2023)
- 1926 – Bob Rosburg, American golfer (died 2009)
- 1926 – Leonard Rossiter, English actor (died 1984)
- 1927 – Fritz Wintersteller, Austrian mountaineer (died 2018)
- 1927 – Howard Zieff, American director and photographer (died 2009)
- 1928 – Whitey Ford, American baseball player and coach (died 2020)
- 1928 – Eudóxia Maria Froehlich, Brazilian zoologist (died 2015)
- 1928 – Vern Mikkelsen, American basketball player and coach (died 2013)
- 1929 – Pierre Bellemare, French radio and television host (died 2018)
- 1929 – Fritz Hollaus, Austrian footballer (died 1994)
- 1929 – Ursula K. Le Guin, American author and critic (died 2018)
- 1929 – George Stinney Jr., wrongfully convicted African-American inmate; second youngest person in the U.S. to be executed (died 1944)
- 1930 – Ivan Silayev, Russian engineer and politician, 19th Prime Minister of Russia (died 2023)
- 1931 – Shammi Kapoor, Indian actor and director (died 2011)
- 1931 – Jim Parks Jr., English cricketer and manager (died 2022)
- 1932 – Pál Csernai, Hungarian footballer and manager (died 2013)
- 1933 – Maureen Duffy, English author, poet, playwright and activist (died 2026)
- 1933 – Francisco Gento, Spanish footballer and manager (died 2022)
- 1935 – Derek Bell, Irish harp player, pianist, and songwriter (died 2002)
- 1935 – Mel Street, American country music singer-songwriter and guitarist (died 1978)
- 1937 – Said Afandi al-Chirkawi, Russian spiritual leader and scholar (died 2012)
- 1937 – Hank Nelson, Australian historian and academic (died 2012)
- 1938 – Carl Brewer, Canadian ice hockey player (died 2001)
- 1940 – Geoffrey Boycott, English cricketer and sportscaster
- 1940 – Frances FitzGerald, American journalist and author
- 1940 – Manfred Mann, South African-English keyboard player and producer
- 1940 – Marita Petersen, Faroese educator and politician, Prime Minister of the Faroe Islands (died 2001)
- 1941 – Steve Cropper, American guitarist, songwriter, producer, and actor (died 2025)
- 1942 – Elvin Bishop, American singer-songwriter and guitarist
- 1942 – Allan Grice, Australian race car driver and politician
- 1942 – Lou Lamoriello, American ice hockey player, coach, and manager
- 1942 – Judy Sheindlin, American judge and television host
- 1942 – Christopher A. Sims, American economist and statistician, Nobel Prize laureate
- 1942 – John Stevens, Baron Stevens of Kirkwhelpington, English police officer and academic
- 1942 – Thomas Cavalier-Smith, English academic and biologist (died 2021)
- 1943 – Tariq Ali, Pakistani historian and author
- 1943 – Ron Elliott, American singer-songwriter, guitarist, and composer
- 1944 – Mandy Rice-Davies, English model and actress (died 2014)
- 1944 – Jean-Pierre Sauvage, French chemist, (Nobel Prize for Chemistry, 2016, for the development of molecular machines)
- 1944 – Michael Tugendhat, English lawyer and judge
- 1945 – Everett McGill, American actor
- 1945 – Nikita Mikhalkov, Russian filmmaker
- 1945 – Michael White, English journalist
- 1946 – Jane Heal, English philosopher and academic
- 1946 – Jim Hill, American football player and sportscaster
- 1946 – Lux Interior, American singer-songwriter (died 2009)
- 1946 – Lee Loughnane, American singer-songwriter and trumpet player
- 1947 – Dominique Braye, French politician
- 1948 – Shaye J. D. Cohen, American historian and academic
- 1948 – Allen Henry Vigneron, American archbishop
- 1949 – Michel Brière, Canadian ice hockey player (died 1971)
- 1949 – Mike Keenan, Canadian ice hockey player and coach
- 1949 – Benjamin Netanyahu, Israeli captain and politician, 9th Prime Minister of Israel
- 1950 – Ronald McNair, American physicist and astronaut (died 1986)
- 1950 – Leela Vernon, Belizean musician and cultural conservationist (died 2017)
- 1952 – Patti Davis, American actress and author
- 1952 – Allen Hoey, American poet and author (died 2010)
- 1952 – Brent Mydland, German-American keyboard player (died 1990)
- 1953 – Charlotte Caffey, American guitarist and songwriter
- 1953 – Eric Faulkner, Scottish singer-songwriter and guitarist
- 1953 – Keith Green, American singer-songwriter, pianist, and minister (died 1982)
- 1953 – Marc Johnson, American bassist, composer, and bandleader
- 1953 – Peter Mandelson, English journalist and politician, Secretary of State for Northern Ireland
- 1954 – Brian Tobin, Canadian journalist and politician, 6th Premier of Newfoundland
- 1955 – Dick DeVos, American businessman
- 1955 – Catherine Hardwicke, American film director, producer, and screenwriter
- 1955 – Fred Hersch, American pianist and composer
- 1955 – Rich Mullins, American singer-songwriter (died 1997)
- 1956 – Carrie Fisher, American actress and screenwriter (died 2016)
- 1956 – Mike Tully, American pole vaulter
- 1957 – Julian Cope, English singer-songwriter
- 1957 – Irene Edgar, Scottish lawn bowler
- 1957 – Wolfgang Ketterle, German physicist and academic, Nobel Prize laureate
- 1957 – Steve Lukather, American singer-songwriter, guitarist, and producer
- 1958 – Andre Geim, Russian-English physicist and academic, Nobel Prize laureate
- 1959 – George Bell, Dominican baseball player
- 1959 – Rose McDowall, Scottish singer-songwriter and guitarist
- 1959 – Andy Picheta, English director, producer, and screenwriter
- 1959 – Kevin Sheedy, Welsh-Irish footballer and manager
- 1959 – Ken Watanabe, Japanese actor and producer
- 1959 – Melora Walters, American actress, director, and writer
- 1962 – David Campese, Australian rugby player and coach
- 1964 – Jon Carin, American singer-songwriter, guitarist, and producer
- 1965 – Ion Andoni Goikoetxea, Spanish footballer and manager
- 1965 – Horace Hogan, American wrestler
- 1965 – Hisashi Imai, Japanese singer-songwriter and guitarist
- 1966 – Phillip Price, Welsh golfer
- 1966 – Igor Prins, Estonian footballer and manager
- 1966 – Arne Sandstø, Norwegian footballer and manager
- 1967 – Georgi Dakov, Bulgarian high jumper (died 1996)
- 1967 – Paul Ince, English footballer and manager
- 1967 – Gavin Lovegrove, New Zealand javelin thrower and graphic designer
- 1967 – Krzysztof Sitko, Polish association football player (died 2018)
- 1968 – Alexandros Alexandris, Greek footballer and manager
- 1968 – Kerstin Andreae, German politician
- 1969 – Michael Hancock, Australian rugby league player
- 1969 – Mo Lewis, American football player
- 1970 – Louis Koo, Hong Kong actor and singer
- 1971 – Hal Duncan, Scottish author and poet
- 1971 – Damien Martyn, Australian cricketer
- 1971 – Nick Oliveri, American singer-songwriter and bass player
- 1971 – Conor O'Shea, Irish rugby player and coach
- 1971 – Paul Telfer, Scottish footballer and coach
- 1971 – Thomas Ulsrud, Norwegian curler (died 2022)
- 1972 – Ashutosh Agashe, Indian businessman and cricketer
- 1972 – Matthew Friedberger, American singer-songwriter and guitarist
- 1972 – Orlando Thomas, American football player (died 2014)
- 1972 – Evhen Tsybulenko, Ukrainian scholar and academic
- 1973 – Lera Auerbach, Russian-American pianist and composer
- 1973 – Charlie Lowell, American pianist and songwriter
- 1974 – Costel Busuioc, Romanian tenor
- 1975 – Toby Hall, American baseball player
- 1975 – Henrique Hilário, Portuguese footballer
- 1976 – Henrik Gustavsson, Swedish footballer
- 1976 – Jeremy Miller, American actor and singer
- 1976 – Lavinia Miloșovici, Romanian gymnast
- 1976 – Josh Ritter, American singer-songwriter and guitarist
- 1976 – Andrew Scott, Irish actor
- 1976 – Mélanie Turgeon, Canadian skier
- 1978 – Will Estes, American actor
- 1978 – Joey Harrington, American football player and sportscaster
- 1978 – Henrik Klingenberg, Finnish singer and keyboard player
- 1978 – Michael McMillian, American actor
- 1979 – Khalil Greene, American baseball player
- 1979 – Gabe Gross, American baseball player
- 1980 – Kim Kardashian, American reality television personality, actress, model, businesswoman and socialite
- 1980 – Brian Pittman, American bass player
- 1981 – Martin Castrogiovanni, Argentine-Italian rugby player
- 1981 – Olivier Pla, French racing driver
- 1981 – Nemanja Vidić, Serbian footballer
- 1982 – Matt Dallas, American actor
- 1982 – Jim Henderson, American baseball player
- 1982 – Antony Kay, English footballer
- 1982 – Hari Kondabolu, American comedian, actor, and podcaster
- 1982 – Ray Ventrone, American football player
- 1982 – Lee Chong Wei, Malaysian badminton player
- 1982 – James White, American basketball player
- 1983 – Casey Fien, American baseball player
- 1983 – Zack Greinke, American baseball player
- 1983 – Brent Hayden, Canadian swimmer
- 1983 – Gonzalo Klusener, Argentine footballer
- 1983 – Andy Marte, Dominican baseball player (died 2017)
- 1983 – Amber Rose, American model
- 1983 – Chris Sherrington, English-Scottish martial artist
- 1983 – Charlotte Sullivan, Canadian actress
- 1983 – Ninet Tayeb, Israeli singer
- 1983 – Shelden Williams, American basketball player
- 1984 – Anna Bogdanova, Russian heptathlete
- 1984 – Tom Brandstater, American football player
- 1984 – Kenny Cooper, American soccer player
- 1984 – Anouk Leblanc-Boucher, Canadian speed skater
- 1984 – José Lobatón, Venezuelan baseball player
- 1984 – Marvin Mitchell, American football player
- 1984 – Kieran Richardson, English footballer
- 1985 – Simone Bracalello, Italian footballer
- 1985 – Dean Collis, Australian rugby league player
- 1985 – Hadise, Belgian-Turkish singer-songwriter and dancer
- 1986 – Almen Abdi, Swiss footballer
- 1986 – Chibuzor Chilaka, Nigerian footballer
- 1986 – Scott Rendell, English footballer
- 1987 – Tonje Brenna, Norwegian politician
- 1987 – Justin De Fratus, American baseball player
- 1987 – Andrey Grechin, Russian swimmer
- 1988 – Hope Hicks, Donald Trump's Former White House Communications Director
- 1988 – Ricki Olsen, Danish footballer
- 1988 – Glen Powell, American actor
- 1988 – Daniel Schorn, Austrian cyclist
- 1989 – Mads Dahm, Norwegian footballer
- 1989 – Festus Ezeli, Nigerian-American basketball player
- 1989 – Luke Murphy, English footballer
- 1989 – Jonathan Viera, Spanish footballer
- 1989 – Sam Vokes, English-Welsh footballer
- 1990 – Bengali-Fodé Koita, French footballer
- 1990 – Mathieu Peybernes, French footballer
- 1990 – Ricky Rubio, Spanish basketball player
- 1990 – Kristján Þórður Snæbjarnarson, Icelandic politician
- 1991 – Alexander Burmistrov, Russian ice hockey player
- 1991 – Tom Eastman, English footballer
- 1991 – Geoffry Hairemans, Belgian footballer
- 1991 – Rob Keogh, English cricketer
- 1991 – Vadaine Oliver, English footballer
- 1991 – Harry Pell, English footballer
- 1992 – Natasha Bassett, Australian actress
- 1992 – Marzia Kjellberg, Italian businessperson and former YouTuber
- 1992 – Damion Lee, American basketball player
- 1992 – Bernard Tomic, German-Australian tennis player
- 1993 – Kane Brown, American singer and songwriter
- 1995 – Cameron Burgess, Scottish-Australian footballer
- 1995 – Doja Cat, American rapper, singer and songwriter
- 1995 – Antoinette Guedia Mouafo, Cameroonian swimmer
- 1998 – Kerem Aktürkoğlu, Turkish footballer
- 1999 – Matteo Gabbia, Italian footballer
- 2002 – Thierno Barry, French footballer

== Deaths ==
=== Pre-1600 ===
- 645 – Zhenzhu Khan, khan of Xueyantuo
- 1023 – Gero, Archbishop of Magdeburg
- 1096 – Walter Sans Avoir, a leader of the First Crusade
- 1125 – Cosmas of Prague, Bohemian priest and historian (born 1045)
- 1204 – Robert de Beaumont, 4th Earl of Leicester, English politician
- 1221 – Alix, Duchess of Brittany (born 1201)
- 1266 – Birger Jarl, Swedish politician (born 1210)
- 1314 – Geoffrey de Geneville, 1st Baron Geneville
- 1422 – Charles VI of France (born 1368)
- 1500 – Emperor Go-Tsuchimikado of Japan (born 1442)
- 1505 – Paul Scriptoris, German mathematician and educator (born 1460)
- 1556 – Pietro Aretino, Italian author (born 1492)
- 1558 – Julius Caesar Scaliger, Italian physician and scholar (born 1484)
- 1600 – Ōtani Yoshitsugu, Japanese samurai (born 1558)

=== 1601–1900 ===
- 1623 – William Wade, English politician and diplomat, Lieutenant of the Tower of London (born 1546)
- 1662 – Henry Lawes, English composer (born 1595)
- 1687 – Edmund Waller, English poet and politician (born 1606)
- 1765 – Giovanni Paolo Panini, Italian painter and architect (born 1691)
- 1775 – Peyton Randolph, American lawyer and politician, 1st President of the Continental Congress (born 1721)
- 1777 – Samuel Foote, English actor and playwright (born 1720)
- 1803 – Thomas Russell, executed Irish rebel (born 1767)
- 1805 – John Cooke, English captain (born 1763)
- 1805 – George Duff, Scottish captain (born 1764)
- 1805 – Horatio Nelson, 1st Viscount Nelson, English admiral (born 1758)
- 1821 – Dorothea Ackermann, German actress (born 1752)
- 1835 – Muthuswami Dikshitar, Indian poet and composer (born 1775)
- 1861 – Edward Dickinson Baker, American congressman and colonel (born 1811)
- 1872 – Jacques Babinet, French physicist, mathematician, and astronomer (born 1794)
- 1873 – Johan Sebastian Welhaven, Norwegian author, poet, and critic (born 1807)
- 1886 – José Hernández, Argentine writer (born 1834)
- 1896 – James Henry Greathead, South African-English engineer (born 1844)

=== 1901–present ===
- 1903 – Jinmaku Kyūgorō, Japanese sumo wrestler, the 12th Yokozuna (born 1829)
- 1904 – Isabelle Eberhardt, Swiss explorer and journalist (born 1877)
- 1907 – Jules Chevalier, French priest, founded the Missionaries of the Sacred Heart (born 1824)
- 1927 – Borisav Stanković, Serbian author (born 1876)
- 1931 – Arthur Schnitzler, Austrian author and playwright (born 1862)
- 1938 – Dorothy Hale, American actress (born 1905)
- 1939 – Hendrik Wortman, Dutch civil engineer (born 1859)
- 1940 – William G. Conley, American journalist, lawyer, and politician, 18th Governor of West Virginia (born 1866)
- 1941 – Alexander Greenlaw Hamilton, Australian biologist (born 1852)
- 1944 – Alois Kayser, German-French missionary (born 1877)
- 1952 – Hans Merensky, South African geologist and philanthropist (born 1871)
- 1963 – Józef Franczak, Polish sergeant (born 1918)
- 1965 – Bill Black, American bass player and bandleader (born 1926)
- 1969 – Jack Kerouac, American novelist and poet (born 1922)
- 1969 – Wacław Sierpiński, Polish mathematician and academic (born 1882)
- 1970 – Li Linsi, Chinese educator and diplomat (born 1896)
- 1971 – Minnie Evans, American artist (born 1888)
- 1973 – Nasif Estéfano, Argentine race car driver (born 1932)
- 1975 – Charles Reidpath, American runner and general (born 1887)
- 1977 – Ferit Tüzün, Turkish composer (born 1929)
- 1978 – Anastas Mikoyan, Armenian-Russian civil servant and politician (born 1895)
- 1980 – Hans Asperger, Austrian physician and psychologist (born 1906)
- 1982 – Radka Toneff, Norwegian singer-songwriter (born 1952)
- 1983 – Joseph P. Lordi, American government official (born 1919)
- 1984 – François Truffaut, French actor, director, producer, and screenwriter (born 1932)
- 1985 – Dan White, American assassin and politician (born 1946)
- 1986 – Lionel Murphy, Australian jurist and politician, 22nd Attorney-General of Australia (born 1922)
- 1989 – Jean Image, Hungarian-French director, producer, and screenwriter (born 1910)
- 1990 – Dany Chamoun, Lebanese engineer and politician (born 1934)
- 1990 – Prabhat Ranjan Sarkar, Indian spiritual guru, philosopher and author (born 1921)
- 1991 – Lorenc Antoni, Albanian composer, conductor, and musicologist (born 1909)
- 1992 – Ante Ciliga, Croatian politician, writer and publisher (born 1898)
- 1992 – Jim Garrison, American lawyer and judge (born 1921)
- 1993 – Sam Zolotow, American journalist and critic (born 1899)
- 1995 – Maxene Andrews, American singer (born 1916)
- 1995 – Jesús Blasco, Spanish author and illustrator (born 1919)
- 1995 – Nancy Graves, American sculptor and painter (born 1939)
- 1995 – Shannon Hoon, American singer-songwriter and guitarist (born 1967)
- 1996 – Georgios Zoitakis, Greek general and politician (born 1910)
- 1998 – Francis W. Sargent, American soldier and politician, 64th Governor of Massachusetts (born 1915)
- 1999 – Lars Bo, Danish author and illustrator (born 1924)
- 1999 – Ahmet Taner Kışlalı, Turkish political scientist, lawyer, and politician (born 1939)
- 2002 – Edward J. Mortola, American academic and president of Pace University (born 1917)
- 2003 – Louise Day Hicks, American politician (born 1916)
- 2003 – Luis A. Ferré, Puerto Rican engineer and politician, 3rd Governor of Puerto Rico (born 1904)
- 2003 – Elliott Smith, American singer-songwriter and guitarist (born 1969)
- 2006 – Sandy West, American singer-songwriter and drummer (born 1959)
- 2007 – Paul Fox, English singer-songwriter and guitarist (born 1951)
- 2010 – A. Ayyappan, Indian poet and translator (born 1949)
- 2011 – Hikmet Bilâ, Turkish journalist and author (born 1954)
- 2011 – Tone Pavček, Slovenian poet and author (born 1928)
- 2012 – Yash Chopra, Indian director, producer, and screenwriter (born 1932)
- 2012 – Antoni Dobrowolski, Polish educator (born 1904)
- 2012 – Jaroslav Kozlík, Czech volleyball player and educator (born 1907)
- 2012 – Alf Kumalo, South African photographer and journalist (born 1930)
- 2012 – George McGovern, American historian, lieutenant, and politician (born 1922)
- 2013 – Bud Adams, American businessman (born 1923)
- 2013 – Gianni Ferrio, Italian composer and conductor (born 1924)
- 2013 – Rune T. Kidde, Danish author, poet, and illustrator (born 1957)
- 2013 – Colonel Robert Morris, American singer-songwriter and drummer (born 1954)
- 2013 – Major Owens, American librarian and politician (born 1936)
- 2013 – Tony Summers, Welsh swimmer (born 1924)
- 2013 – Oscar Yanes, Venezuelan journalist and author (born 1927)
- 2014 – Ben Bradlee, American journalist and author (born 1921)
- 2014 – Nelson Bunker Hunt, American businessman (born 1926)
- 2014 – Mohammad-Reza Mahdavi Kani, Iranian cleric and politician, Prime Minister of Iran (born 1931)
- 2014 – Edith Kawelohea McKinzie, Hawaiian genealogist, author, and hula expert (born 1925)
- 2014 – Gough Whitlam, Australian lieutenant, lawyer, and politician, 21st Prime Minister of Australia (born 1916)
- 2015 – France Bučar, Slovenian lawyer and politician (born 1923)
- 2015 – Marty Ingels, American actor (born 1936)
- 2015 – Norman W. Moore, English conservationist and author (born 1923)
- 2015 – Sheldon Wolin, American philosopher, theorist, and academic (born 1922)
- 2020 – Frank Bough, English television presenter (born 1933)
- 2021 – Bernard Haitink, Dutch conductor and violinist (born 1929)
- 2023 – Bobby Charlton, English footballer and manager (born 1937)
- 2023 – Bobi, Portuguese dog (born 1992)
- 2023 – Bill Hayden, Australian politician, 21st Governor General of Australia (born 1933)
- 2024 – Mimi Hines, Canadian singer and comedian (born 1933)
- 2025 – Francisco Pinto Balsemão, Portuguese politician, former Prime Minister of Portugal (born 1937)

== Holidays and observances ==
- Armed Forces Day (Honduras)
- Christian feast day:
  - Céline of Laon
  - Blessed Charles of Austria (Roman Catholic Church)
  - Fintán of Taghmon
  - Hilarion
  - John of Bridlington
  - Laura of Saint Catherine of Siena
  - Malchus of Syria
  - Pedro Calungsod
  - Peter Yu Tae-chol
  - Severinus of Bordeaux
  - Tuda of Lindisfarne
  - Ursula
  - Viator of Lyons
  - October 21 (Eastern Orthodox liturgics)
- Egyptian Naval Day (Egypt)
- Indian Police Commemoration Day (India)
- National Nurses' Day (Thailand)
- Ndadaye Day (Burundi)
- Overseas Chinese Day (Republic of China)
- Trafalgar Day (the British Empire in the 19th and early 20th century)
- Birth of the Báb (2017) (Baháʼí Faith)
