= Volkmar (crusader) =

11th-century German crusader

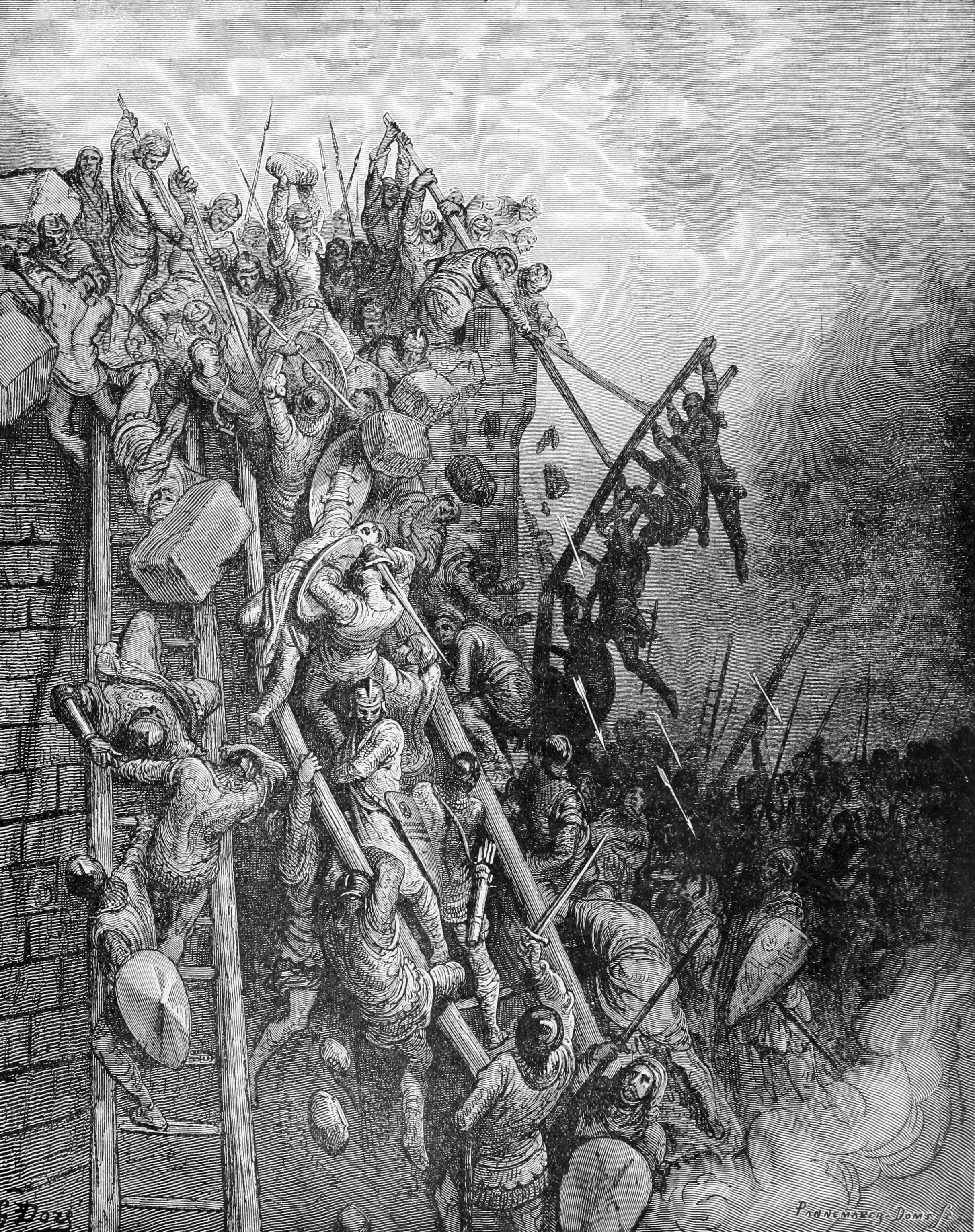
- The Army of Priest Volkmar and Count Emicio Attacks Mersbourg by Gustave Doré, c. 19th century
- Born: 11th century Germany (likely Saxony or Bohemia)
- Died: 1096
- Allegiance: People's Crusade

Volkmar was a preacher-crusader who traveled in the People's Crusade movement initiated by Peter the Hermit. He, alongside Emicho, are most infamous for their leadership in massacring the Jewish civilians on their way to the Jerusalem. Volkmar and his men were subsequently defeated by the Kingdom of Hungary.

== Life and crusading ==
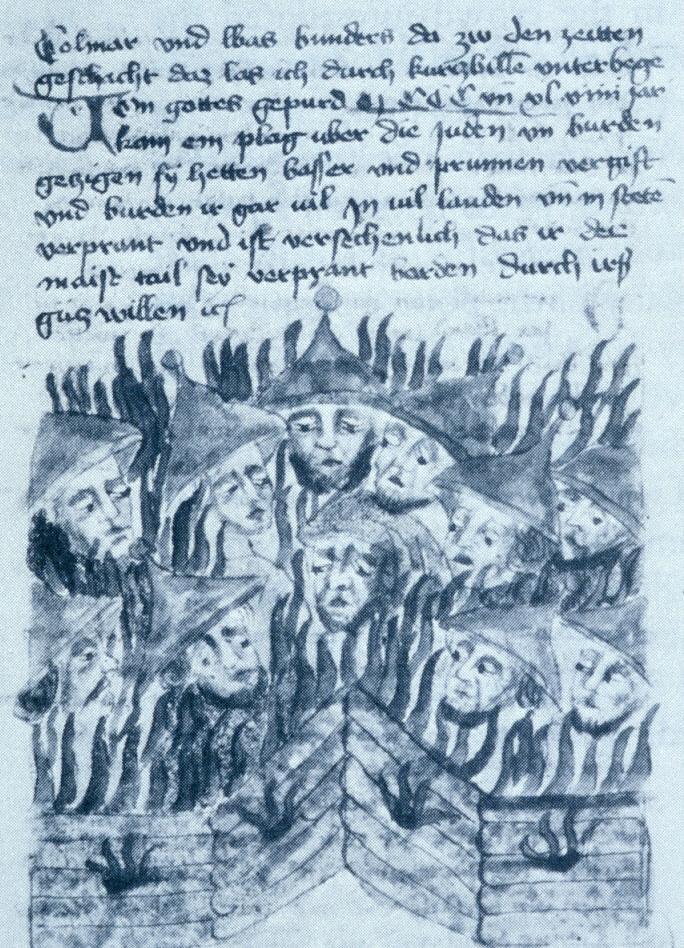
Burning and killing of Jews by Volkmar at the time of the First Crusade (Prague)

The origins of Volkmar are unknown, but his name suggests he emerged among the German pilgrims of the People's Crusade. Volkmar set out from the Rhineland with over 10,000 Crusaders, taking a route through Bohemia. Though Volkmar's army exhibited less strength and brigandry than Emicho's, he was nonetheless inspired by the count's persecution of Jewish people. Arriving in Prague at the end of May, Volkmar and his men began massacring the city's Jewish citizens by the end of June, resisting all local authorities and the protests of Bishop Cosmas.

After their sojourn in Prague, Volkmar and his followers traveled into the Kingdom of Hungary. But the Hungarians had no patience for Volkmar and his bloodshed and so, by order of Coloman of Hungary, proceeded to attack and break their ranks, slaying and imprisoning many. Volkmar's fate is unknown, though he was likely killed or captured.

== Legacy ==
The fall of Volkmar's Crusade (alongside the parallel destruction of Gottschalk's) was perceived by some Christians as righteous punishment for their massacring or as the natural result of such bloodthirsty actions.

== See also ==
- Worms massacre (1096)
