= Solières Abbey =

Former nunnery in Liège Province, Belgium

Coordinates: 50°28′37″N 5°10′44″E

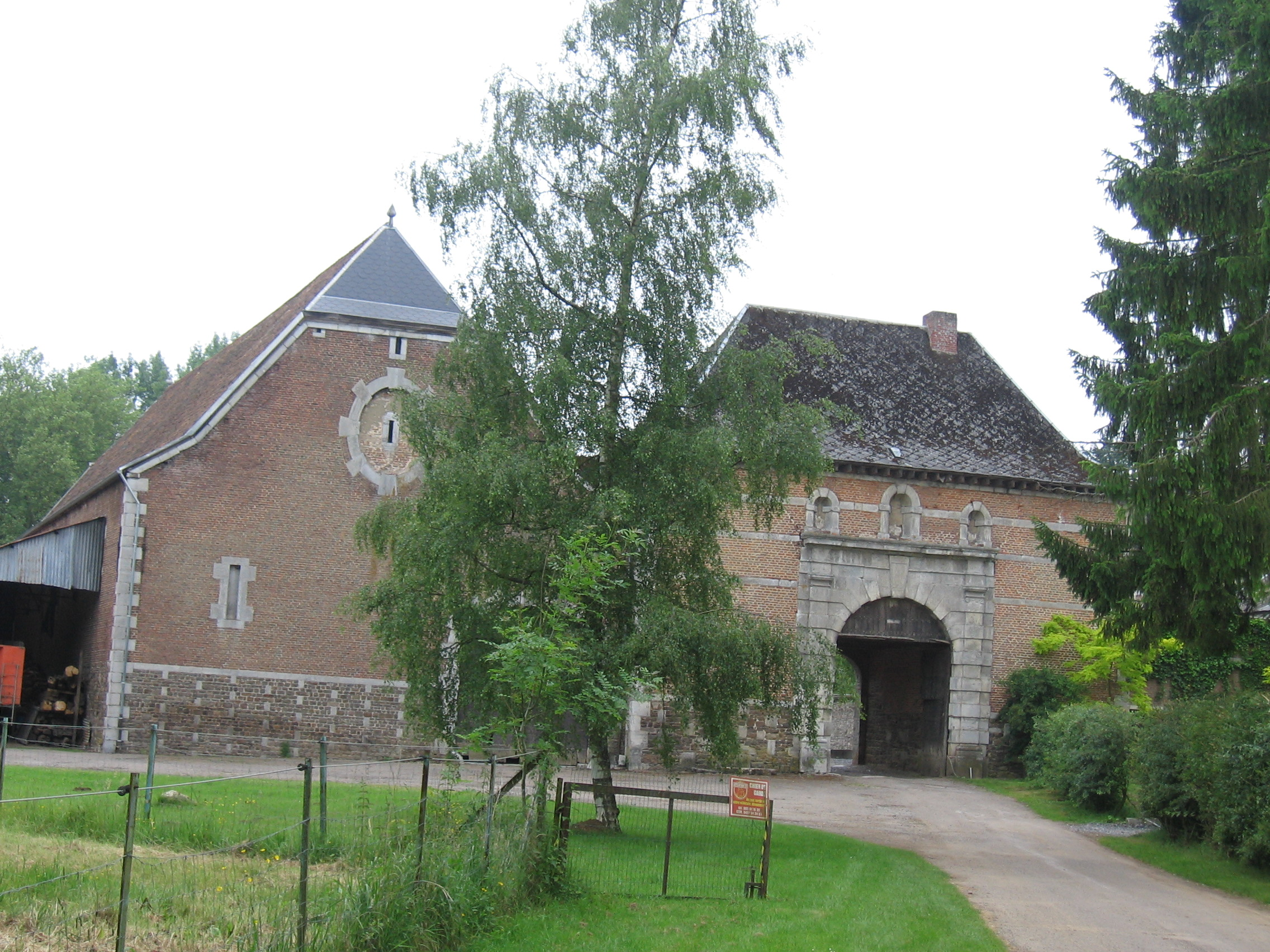
Gateway of the former abbey

Solières Abbey (French: Abbaye de Solières) is a former Cistercian nunnery located in Wallonia in the district of Ben-Ahin, municipality of Huy, province of Liège, Belgium.

== History ==
The abbey was founded in the late 12th century as an Augustinian community, which affiliated itself to the Cistercians in 1229. It is said the abbey was founded in 1100AD by Peter the Hermit, on his return from the First Crusade.

The abbey was dissolved in 1795 during the French Revolution and sold off as a national asset in 1797.

== Château ==
The church and most of the conventual buildings were demolished but the purchaser of the abbess's residence, built in 1658, converted it into a mansion for his own use, from which time it was known as the Château de l'Abbaye de Solières.

In 1935 it was purchased by the insurance co-operative of the Belgian Socialist Party, who used it as a home for mentally and physically handicapped boys, under the name L'Heureux Abri. It returned to private ownership in 1999, and is again known as the Château de l'Abbaye de Solières. The building is a protected Walloon monument but is conspicuously in a very poor state of repair.

== Bibliography ==
- Sacre, M. F., 1881-82: Documents pour servir à l'histoire de l'abbaye de Solières in BCHSBA, pp 35–68
- Depaquier, W., 1896: Histoire de l'abbaye de Solières in BSAH, Liège I. X, p 50 ff
- Ereve, P., 1980: Histoire de l'Abbaye de Solières, Ben-Ahin-lez-Huy, L'Heureux Abri (40 pp)
- Mardaga, P. (ed.), 1990: Le patrimoine monumental de la Belgique, vol. 15: Wallonie, Liège, entité de Huy. Liège ISBN 2-8021-0097-1
