= Siege of Xerigordos =

Battle in the People's (First) Crusade

Coordinates: 40.3925°N 29.8042°E

- Part of the People's Crusade
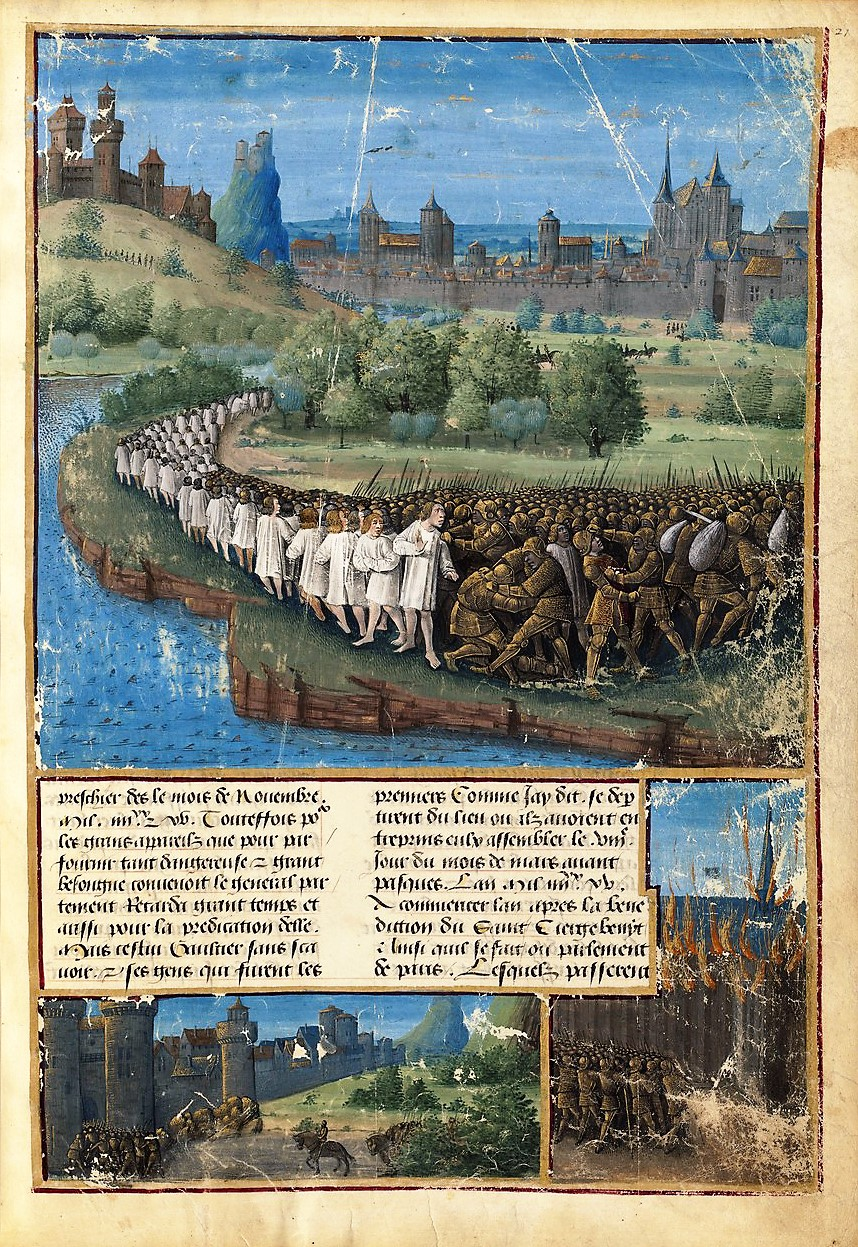
- The defeat of the People's Crusade
Date	21–29 September 1096
Location	Xerigordos, near Nicaea (modern-day İznik, Bursa, Turkey)
Result	Seljuk victory
Territorial changes	Xerigordos is recaptured from the Crusaders

Belligerents
People's Crusade	Seljuk Turks

Commanders and leaders
Rainald of Broyes	Kilij Arslan I Elchanes

Strength
Unknown	Unknown

Casualties and losses
Heavy	Relatively low

The siege of Xerigordos in 1096 (often Xerigordon in modern historical literature) pitted 6,000 Germans of the People's Crusade under Rainald of Broyes against the Turks commanded by Elchanes, general of Kilij Arslan, the Seljuk Sultan of Rûm. The Crusader raiding party captured the Turkish fort of Xerigordos, about four days' march from Nicaea, in an attempt to set up a pillaging outpost. Elchanes arrived three days later and besieged the Crusaders. The defenders had no water supply, and after eight days of siege, they surrendered on September 29. Some of the Crusaders converted to Islam, while others who refused were killed.

== Background ==
The army of the People's Crusade landed in Asia Minor on August 6, 1096, and camped at Helenopolis (Civetot/Civetote) to the north-west of Nicaea, at that time capital of the Seljuk Sultanate of Rûm. The young Sultan Kilij Arslan I was in the middle of a military campaign to the east, fighting the Danishmend emirate.

While waiting for the main Crusader army, the disorganized army began to attack the villages surrounding Nicaea. The raiding party returned unhindered many times with their booty, at some point even defeating the garrison of Nicaea when it tried to stop them. Reinald led 6,000 Germans including 200 knights, on similar raids. Reinald was unsatisfied with the pillaging results near Nicaea and went farther to Xerigordos, a fortress four days' march to the east, to set up a pillaging base. On September 18, 1096, Reinald easily defeated the Xerigordos garrison.

Kilij Arslan ordered his general, Elchanes, to deal with the Crusader's raiding parties with his troops, mostly mounted archers.

== Battle ==
Elchanes arrived three days after Reinald occupied Xerigordos, on September 21 and besieged the Crusaders tightly. The speed of the Turkish mounted troops surprised the Germans; they had not expected to be besieged and were unprepared and without adequate supplies. Moreover, there was no water system inside the fortress:

Our people were in such distress from thirst that they bled their horses and asses and drank the blood; others let their girdles and handkerchiefs down into the cistern and squeezed out the water from them into their mouths; some urinated into one another's hollowed hands and drank; and others dug up the moist ground and lay down on their backs and spread the earth over their breasts to relieve the excessive dryness of thirst.

Relief forces never came. Some accounts mention that Turks sent two spies to the Crusaders' camp at Civetot to make them think that Xerigordos was still safe, and even that Nicaea had been conquered by Reinald. Other accounts mention that Crusader leaders on the field were forced by their troops to advance but could not make the decision until news of the Xerigordos surrender arrived on October.

For eight days, the Crusaders resisted thirst and a rain of arrows and smoke from the Turks. Rainald offered surrender of the fort on September 29, 1096. Some of the Crusaders who converted to Islam became slaves, while others who refused to abandon their faith were killed.

== Aftermath ==
Kilij Arslan became more confident and sent his army to ambush the People's Crusade army at the Battle of Civetot en route to Nicaea. While the People's Crusade essentially ended at Civetot, the survivors join Peter the Hermit and the Prince's Crusade toward Jerusalem.
