= Peter the Hermit =

French leader of the People's Crusade (1050–1115/31)

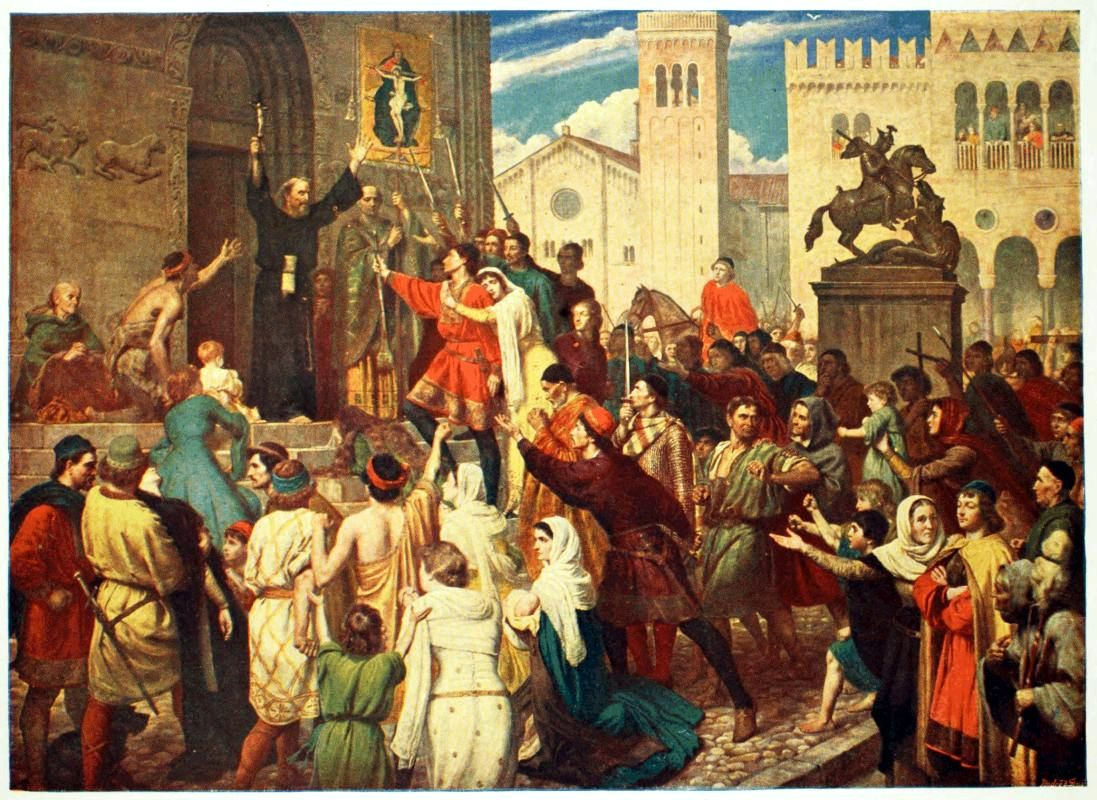
- Peter the Hermit preaching the Crusade to a crowd

Personal life
- Born: c. 1050 Amiens, Kingdom of France
- Died: 8 July 1115 or 1131
- Other names: Cucupeter, Little Peter, Peter of Amiens, Peter of Achères
- Occupation: Priest

Religious life
- Church: Catholic Church

Military service
- Battles/wars: People's Crusade: European Jewish Massacre; Siege of Xerigordos; Battle of Civetot; Prince's Crusade

Peter the Hermit (French: Pierre l'Ermite; c. 1050 – 8 July 1115 or 1131), also known as Little Peter (Petit Pierre), Peter of Amiens (Pierre d'Amiens), or Peter of Achères (Pierre d'Achères), was a Catholic priest of Amiens and a key figure during the military expedition from France to Jerusalem in 1096 known as the People's Crusade. Amongst Jews he is identified with the Rhineland massacres that occurred during his leadership and the precedent they set for subsequent Crusades. He has sometimes been called "Blessed" Peter the Hermit, although he has not been beatified in the Catholic Church.

After leading his followers through Europe, Peter's armies were almost entirely annihilated by the Seljuk Turks, forcing him to winter in Constantinople and join up with the Prince's Crusade. After that, he continued to have a leadership role in varying degrees of significance as the Crusaders invaded the Levant and took Jerusalem.

== Family ==
He is called Pierre l'Ermite in French. The structure of this name in French, unlike its English translation, has led some Francophone scholars to treat l'Ermite as a surname rather than a title.

According to some authors, Peter was born around 1050, the son of Renauld L'Ermite of Auvergne and his wife Alide Montaigu of Picardie. Others claim he was a member of the L'Hermite family of Auvergne in the Netherlands. These claims are disputed by still other authors, who argue that no evidence can confirm that "the Hermit" was an actual surname, and that surnames did not develop until after his time.

== Prior to 1096 ==
According to Anna Komnene's Alexiad (1148), Peter attempted a pilgrimage to Jerusalem before 1096, but was prevented by the Seljuk Turks from reaching his goal and was reportedly mistreated. He was said to have witnessed scenes that disturbed him during this pilgrimage.

When he finally reached the Church of the Holy Sepulchre,

He saw many forbidden and wicked things occurring there... so he sought out the patriarch of the holy church of Jerusalem and asked why gentiles and evil men were able to pollute holy places and steal away offerings from the faithful, using the church as if a stable, beating up Christians, despoiling pilgrims through unjust fees, and inflicting on them many sufferings. The frustrated patriarch threw up his hands in exasperation: "Why do you reprimand me and disturb me in the midst of my fatherly cares? I have but the strength and power of a tiny ant when compared to those proud men. We have to redeem our lives here by regular tribute payments (jizya) or else face death-dealing punishment."

This experience caused Peter to preach inflammatory statements about the Turks to upset Christians. However, doubts remain whether he ever made such a journey.

Sources differ as to whether Peter the Hermit was present at Pope Urban II's Council of Clermont in 1095, where the Pope made his military strategy for the First Crusade public. It is certain that he was one of the preachers of the armed pilgrimage in France afterwards, and his own experience may have helped to give fire to the Roman Catholic cause. Tradition in Huy holds that he was there when the call for war was announced and he began his preaching at once. He soon leapt into fame as an emotional revivalist, and the vast majority of sources and historians agree that thousands of serfs and peasants eagerly took the cross at his bidding, partly because of promises he did make.

This part of the First Crusade was also known as the Crusade of the Paupers. Peter organized and guided the paupers as a spiritually purified and holy group of pilgrims who would—supposedly—be protected by the Holy Ghost. Peter did not train his army, nor did he supply weapons or food. Some historians think it possible that the People's Crusade also included well-armed soldiers and nobles. A list of known participants in Peter's army can be found at The Digital Humanities Institute.

== Crusade to the Holy Land ==
The leader of the Roman Catholic Church, Pope Urban II, commissioned Peter to command an armed pilgrimage to Jerusalem. Before Peter went on his military expedition he received permission from Patriarch Simeon II of Jerusalem. Peter was able to recruit from England, Lorraine, France, and Flanders. He arrived in Cologne, Germany, on Holy Saturday, 12 April 1096.

=== Massacre of Jewish civilians ===
In the spring of 1096, Peter was one of the prominent involved in the Rhineland massacres against Jews. Peter and his troops participated in the torture and slaughter of Jews in Lorraine, Cologne, Worms, Speyer and Mainz. In Mainz, Peter's followers killed a large group of Jews that had been granted refuge by a local bishop in exchange for money. Estimates of the death toll generally vary from 2,000–2,800 civilians, though some claim about 5,000 or even 10,000 people killed.

These killings are known as Gzerot Tatnó (גזרות תתנ"ו; Edicts of 4856). Another group had been led by the knight count Emicho of Leiningen who provoked the group to the massacres.

=== Hungary, Belgrade, and Sofia ===
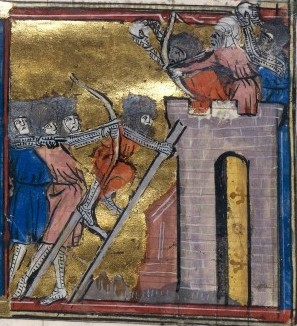
1096 Siege of Nish (1337)

Before reaching Constantinople, Peter and his followers began to experience difficulty. In Zemun, the governor, who was a descendant of a Ghuzz Turk, and a colleague, were frightened by the army's size and decided to tighten regulations on a frontier. This would have been fine if a dispute about the sale of a pair of shoes had not occurred. This led to a riot and against Peter's wishes the town was attacked and the citadel was stormed.

This resulted in 4,000 Hungarians being killed and many provisions being stolen. Then on 26 June 1096 Peter's army was able to cross the Sava river. Then the army marched into Belgrade, set the town on fire, and pillaged it. The army then made its way into and through Nish (Niš) after an eight-day delay. After riding through Nish, the Crusaders made their way towards Sofia, when they were attacked on the road by Byzantine soldiers. The Crusaders took heavy losses, losing a quarter of their army. They arrived in Sofia on 12 July nonetheless.

=== Constantinople ===
Leading the first of the five sections of the People's Crusade to the destination of their pilgrimage, the Church of the Holy Sepulchre, he started (with 40,000 men and women) from Cologne in April 1096 and arrived (with 30,000 men and women) at Constantinople at the end of July. Byzantine emperor Alexios I Komnenos was less than pleased with their arrival, for along with the head of the Eastern Orthodox Church—Patriarch Nicholas III of Constantinople—he was now required to provide for the care and sustenance of the vast host of paupers for the remainder of their journey.

The forces then arrived in Constantinople on 1 August 1096. After a while, they arrived at a castle called Xerigordon and captured it by taking possession of the castle's spring and well. After setting off to Civetot, they set up camp near a village called Dracon. This is where the Turks ambushed Peter and his forces. This was the final battle of the People's Crusade that Peter led.

Most of the paupers failed to make their way out of Catholic jurisdiction. The majority were incapable of being provided for by the various lordships and dioceses along the way and either starved, returned home or were put into servitude, while a substantial number were captured and sold into slavery by the various Slavic robber barons in the Balkans, kindling the view of the Balkan Slavs as unredeemed robbers and villains.

Peter gathered the only other section which had succeeded in reaching Constantinople, that of Walter Sans Avoir, into a single group and encamped the still numerous pilgrims around Constantinople while he negotiated transport of the People's Crusade to the Holy Land. The Emperor meanwhile had failed to provide for the pilgrims adequately and the camp made itself a growing nuisance, as the increasingly hungry paupers turned to pilfering imperial stores.

Alexios, worried at the growing disorder and fearful of his standing before the coming armed Crusader armies, quickly concluded negotiations and shipped them across the Bosporus to the Asiatic shore at the beginning of August, with promises of guards and passage through the Turkish lines. He warned the People's Crusade to await his orders, but in spite of his warnings, the paupers entered Turkish territory. The Turks began skirmishing with the largely unarmed host. Peter returned in desperation to Constantinople, seeking the Emperor's help.

In Peter's absence, the pilgrims were ambushed and cut to pieces in detail by the Turks, who were more disciplined, at the Battle of Civetot. Despite Peter's pronunciations of divine protection, the vast majority of the pilgrims were slaughtered by the swords and arrows of the Turks or were enslaved. Left in Constantinople with the small number of surviving followers, during the winter of 1096–1097, with little hope of securing Byzantine support, the People's Crusade awaited the coming of the armed crusaders as their sole source of protection to complete the pilgrimage.

=== Jerusalem ===
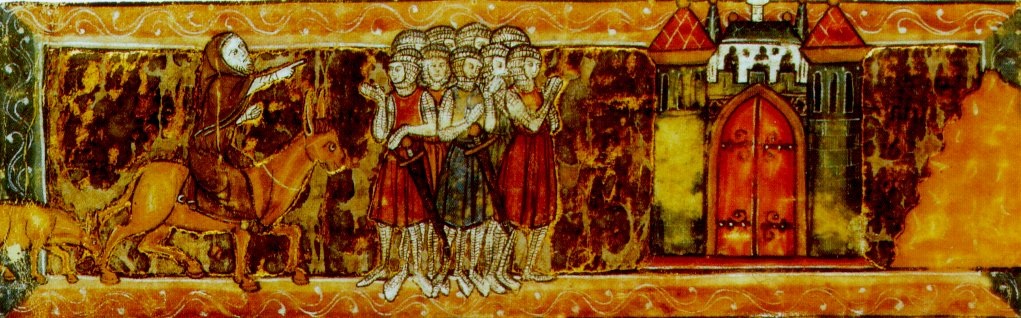
Peter the Hermit shows the crusaders the way to Jerusalem, French illumination, c. 1270.

When the princes arrived, Peter joined their ranks as a member of the council in May 1097, and with the little following which remained they marched together through Asia Minor to Jerusalem. While his "paupers" never regained the numbers prior to the Battle of Civetot, his ranks were increasingly replenished with disarmed, injured, or bankrupted crusaders. Nonetheless, aside from a few rousing speeches to motivate the Crusaders, he played a subordinate part in the remaining history of the First Crusade which at this point clearly settled on a military campaign as the means to secure the pilgrimage routes and holy sites in Palestine.

Peter appears, at the beginning of 1098, as attempting to escape from the privations of the siege of Antioch—showing himself, as Guibert of Nogent says, a "fallen star". Guibert and other sources go on to write that Peter was responsible for the speech before the half-starved and dead Crusaders which motivated their sally from the gates of Antioch and their subsequent victory over the overwhelmingly superior Muslim army besieging the city. Thus, having recovered his stature, in the middle of the year he was sent by the princes to invite Kerbogha to settle all differences via a duel, which the emir subsequently declined.

In 1099 Peter appears as the treasurer of the alms at the siege of Arqa, and as leader of the supplicatory processions around the walls of Jerusalem before it fell, and later within Jerusalem which preceded the Crusaders' surprising victory at the Battle of Ascalon (August). At the end of 1099, Peter went to Latakia, and sailed thence for the West. From this time he disappears from the historical record. Albert of Aix records that he died in 1131, as prior of a church of the Holy Sepulchre which he had founded in France.

== Role in preaching the First Crusade ==
Albert of Aix in his Historia Hierosolymitanae Expeditionis claims that Peter the Hermit was the true author and originator of the First Crusade. This story later appears in the pages of William of Tyre, which indicates that even a few generations after the crusade, the descendants of the crusaders believed Peter was its originator. This myth was dismissed by modern historians beginning with Heinrich von Sybel. Various historical sources also recount that during an early visit to Jerusalem sometime before 1096, Jesus appeared to Peter the Hermit in the Church of the Holy Sepulchre, and bade him preach the crusade.

The origins of these legend is a matter of some interest. Von Sybel suggested that in the camp of the paupers (which existed side by side with that of the knights, and grew increasingly large as the crusade took a heavier toll on the purses of the crusaders) some idolization of Peter the Hermit had already begun, parallel to the similar glorification of Godfrey of Bouillon by the Lorrainers.

== Later life ==
There is very little concrete record for Peter's life after returning to Europe and much of what is known is speculation or legend. However, Albert of Aix records that he died in 1131, as prior of a church of the Holy Sepulchre which he had founded in France or Flanders. It is thought that during the days of famine and cold weather at the Siege of Antioch, Peter attempted to flee only to be captured by the Norman prince Tancred and placed back on the battlefield in 1097. Peter also held services of intercession for Latin and native recruits. Peter advised Greeks and Latins to form processions as well.

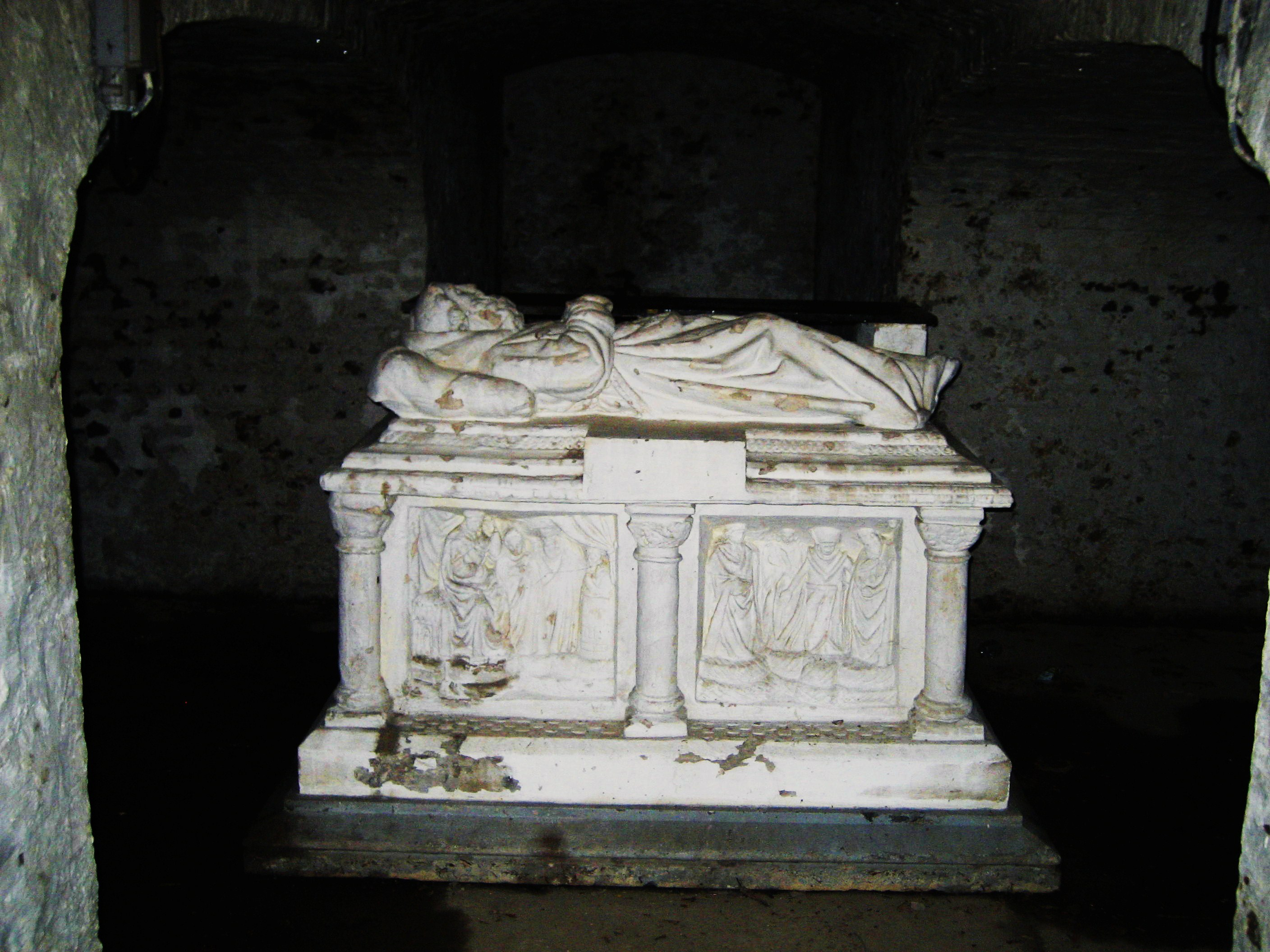
The tomb of Pierre l'Ermite

It is generally quoted that he founded an Augustinian monastery in France named for the Church of the Holy Sepulchre. However, it was actually in Flanders at Neufmoustier near Huy, or in Huy itself which may have been his home town. His tomb is in Neufmoustier Abbey, so it is presumed that this was his abbey but in another tradition the nearby Solières Abbey claims that it was his foundation.

Peter's obituary is in the chronicle of Neufmoustier Abbey. On its page entry of 8 July 1115 the chronicle says that this day saw "the death of Dom Pierre, of pious memory, venerable priest and hermit, who deserved to be appointed by the Lord to announce the first to the holy Cross" and the text continues with "after the conquest of the holy land, Pierre returned to his native country" and also that "he founded this church [...] and chooses them a decent burial". This record further supports Neufmoustier's claim as his foundation.

== Legend ==
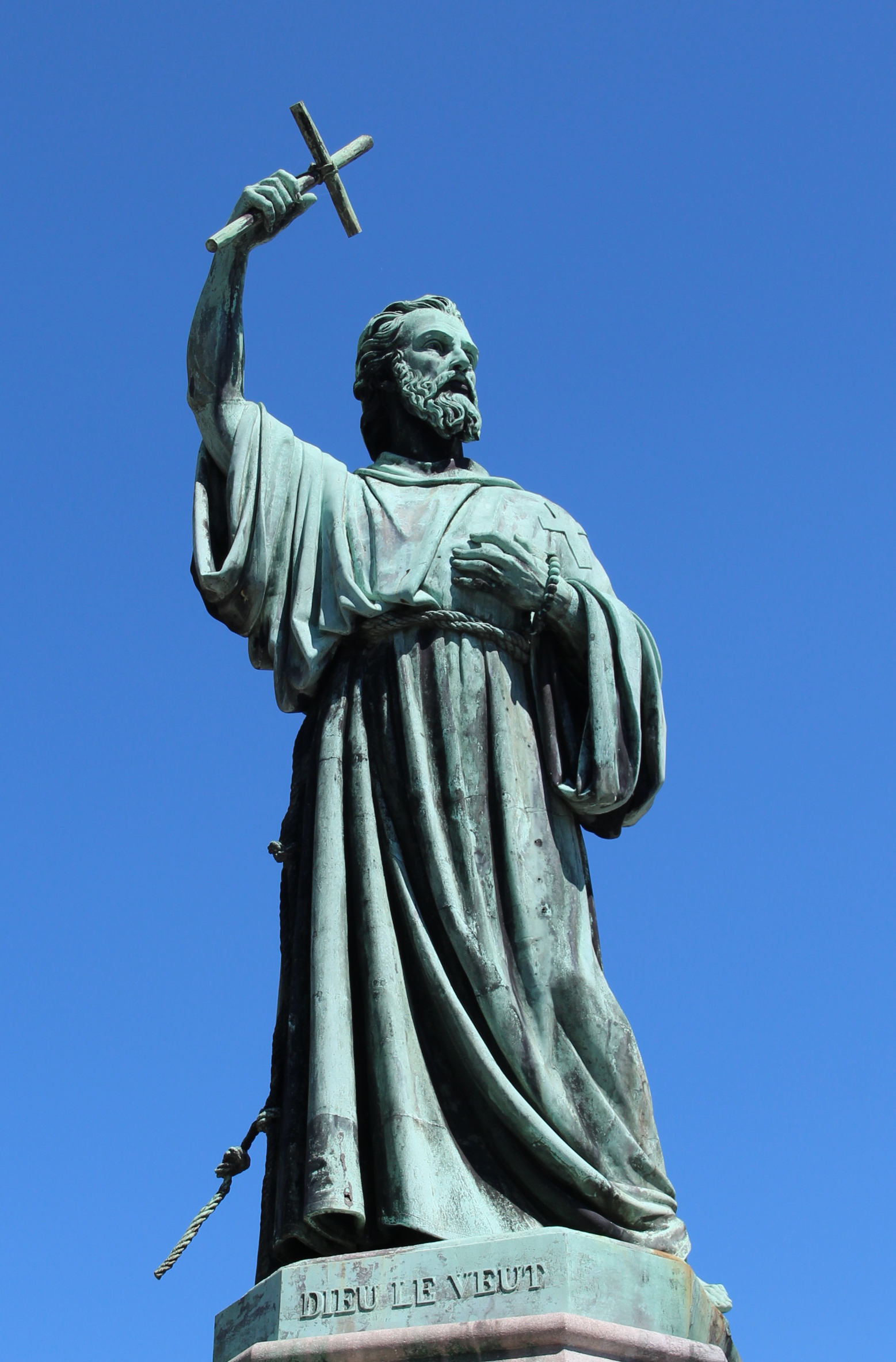
A statue of Peter the Hermit in Amiens

Since his death various legends have sprung up around Peter. One legend has its roots in the writings of Jacques de Vitry, who found it convenient to convince people from the bishopric of Liège of the merits of participating in the Albigensian Crusade by manipulating the story of Peter.

Another legend is given in the 14th century by the French troubadour Jehan-de-Bouteiller, who sings the memory of "a dict Peter the Hermit deschendant a count of Clairmont by a Sieur d'Herrymont [who] married a Montagut". Peter the Hermit's parents would, therefore, be Renauld de Hérimont and Aleidis Montaigu (Aleidis is known in Huy as the "mother of Dom Pierre, with a home in Huy").

There is also a strong and old tradition that Peter the Hermit was the first to introduce the use of the Rosary. It follows that he began this tradition in about 1090.

== See also ==
- List of people known as the Hermit
- Volkmar (crusader)

== Sources ==
- Haaren, John H. (1904). "Peter the Hermit". Famous Men of the Middle Ages. University Publishing Company. pp. 173–179.
- Prof. J. S. C. Riley-Smith, Prof. Jonathan Phillips, Dr. Alan V. Murray, Dr. Guy Perry & Dr. Nicholas Morton. "A Database of Crusaders to the Holy Land, 1099-1149". Digital Humanities Institute.
