= Xerigordos =

Castle in Anatolia

Coordinates: 40.3925°N 29.8042°E

Xerigordos (Greek: ἠ Ξερίγορδος), often incorrectly Xerigordon in modern historiography, was a castle in Anatolia (today Turkey) that served as the setting of the Siege of Xerigordos as a part of the People's Crusade in 1096. The contemporary records assert that the fortress was located on a hill and its water supply came from both a water well and a spring just outside the walls. The exact location has not yet been identified. Albert of Aix wrote that it was about three miles away from Nicaea.

The Greek name Xerigordos is known only from Anna Komnene's Alexiad (Χ.6.2), where it is in the accusative form τὴν Ξερίγορδον (Xerigordon). Guibert of Nogent, in the Gesta Dei per Francos, written in Latin, calls the castle Exorogorgum and places it four days' journey beyond Nicaea. It has been tentatively identified with the modern site known as Eskikale (Turkish "Old Castle").
