= Helenopolis (Bithynia) =

Town in northwest Asia Minor, formerly Drepanon

Coordinates: 40.72339°N 29.50224°E

Helenopolis (Greek: Ἑλενόπολις) or Drepana (Δρέπανα) or Drepanon (Δρέπανον) was an ancient Thracian and later Greco-Roman and Byzantine town in Bithynia, Asia Minor, on the southern side of the Gulf of Astacus. Helenopolis has been identified with the modern village of Hersek, in the district of Altınova, Yalova Province. It is traditionally considered as the birthplace of Saint Helena.

== History ==
According to the 6th-century historian Procopius, Helena's son Emperor Constantine the Great renamed the city "Helenopolis" to honor her birthplace; but the name may simply have honored her without marking her birthplace. Constantine also built there a church in honour of the martyr Saint Lucian; it soon grew in importance, and Constantine lived there very often towards the end of his life.

Near it were some famous mineral springs. These mineral springs might be those of Termal near Yalova.

Emperor Justinian built there an aqueduct, baths and other monuments. It does not seem ever to have grown, and it was slightingly called (a pun on its name) Eleinou Polis, "the wretched town".

Nearby, in the late 11th century, Alexios I Komnenos built a castle called Kibatos/Kibotos or Civetot for Anglo-Saxon mercenaries who had opted to flee England after the Norman Conquest and serve the Byzantine Emperor. On 21 October 1096, the forces of the People's Crusade confronted the Seljuk Turks in the battle of Civetot. The victory of the Turks ended the People's Crusade. In 2019, an academic survey identified the remains of Kibatos/Civetot 3.5 meters underwater in Hersek Lagoon. The remains of the castle span approximately 4,200 square meters and were identified based on architectural similarities to contemporary descriptions. In addition to the discovery of the castle - believed to have been abandoned due to earthquakes at an indeterminate time - among other structures, remains of a pier and lighthouse were found, which were visited by Evliya Çelebi and are known to have been used from the Byzantine period right up until the demise of the Ottoman Empire.

== Ecclesiastical history ==
The see of Helenopolis in Bithynia was a suffragan of the Metropolis of Nicomedia.

Michel Le Quien mentions nine of its bishops. Macrinus, the first, is said to have been at the Council of Nicaea (325), but his name is not given in the authentic lists of the members of the council. About 400, the church of Helenopolis was governed by Palladius of Galatia, the friend and defender of John Chrysostom, and author of the Historia Lausiaca. The last known bishop assisted at the Council of Constantinople (879-880). Helenopolis occurs in the Notitiae Episcopatuum until the twelfth and thirteenth centuries.

Helenopolis in Bithynia is included in the Catholic Church's list of titular sees.

== Sources and external links ==
- Belke, Klaus (2020). Tabula Imperii Byzantini, Band 13: Bithynia und Hellespontos (in German). Vienna: Verlag der Österreichischen Akademie der Wissenschaften. ISBN 978-3-7001-8329-7.
- Catholic Encyclopedia source
- Catholic Hierarchy page
