= Battle of Civetot =

1096 Battle in Anatolia

- Part of the People's Crusade
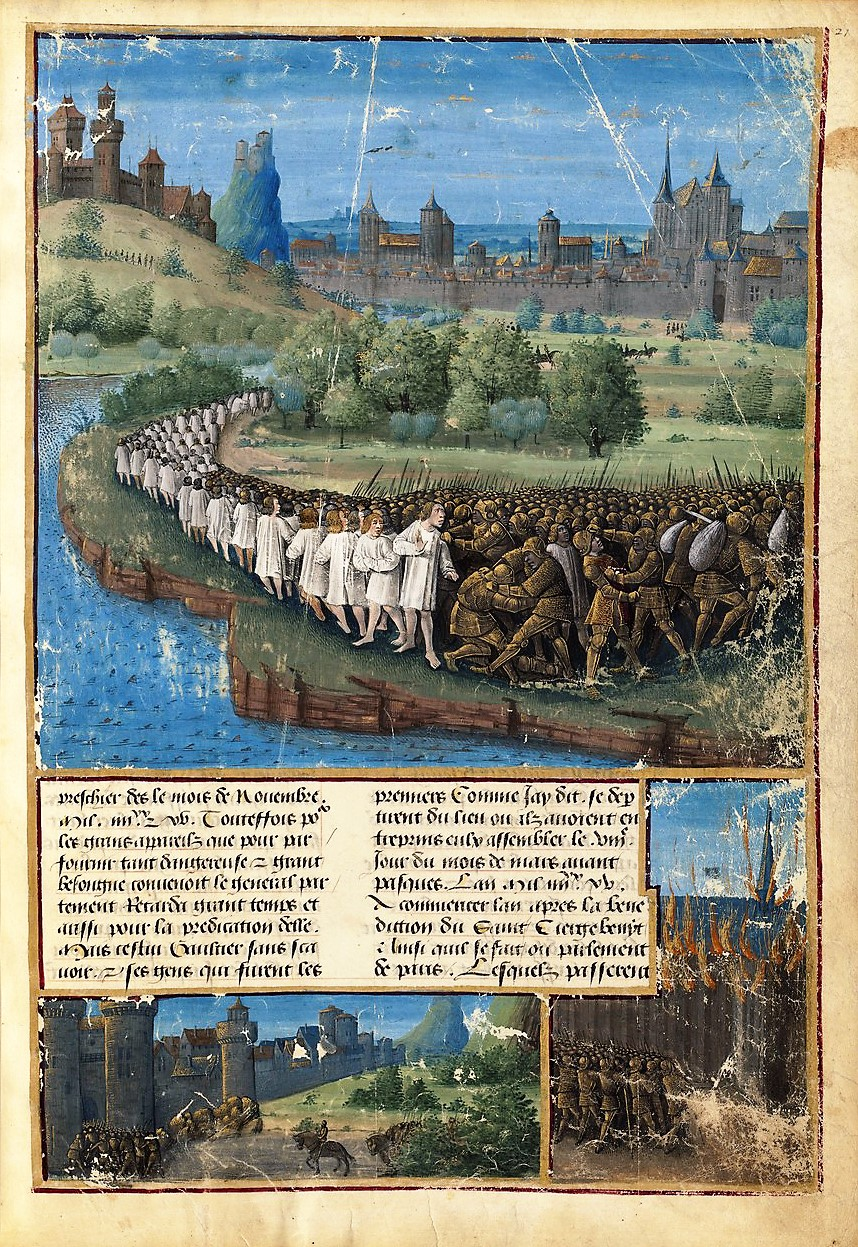
- Medieval illuminated manuscript showing Peter the Hermit's People's Crusade of 1096
Date	21 October 1096
Location	Civetot (modern-day Altinova, Yalova, Turkey) 40°25′54″N 29°09′22″E
Result	Seljuk victory; People's Crusade fails; Remaining survivors later rescued by the Byzantine army and returned to Constantinople

Belligerents
Seljuk Turks	Crusading peasants Byzantine Empire

Commanders and leaders
Kilij Arslan I	Walter Sans-Avoir †; Geoffrey Burel; Constantine Katakalon (led Byzantine relief force)

Strength
5,000, mix of infantry and cavalry	20,000 to 60,000 mainly unarmed or lightly armed Crusading peasants

Casualties and losses
Less than 150	Less than 3,000 survived, many survivors captured and later enslaved.
- Location within Turkey

The Battle of Civetot was fought between the forces of the People's Crusade and of the Seljuk Turks of Anatolia on 21 October 1096. The battle brought an end to the People's Crusade; some of the survivors joined the First Crusade.

== Background ==
The People's Crusade, consisting of soldiers, peasants and priests, set over to Anatolia in the beginning of August 1096. Once there, however, the leadership of the group fell apart, and the Crusaders split along ethnic lines. A German detachment which had captured the castle of Xerigordos (location unknown) was destroyed in the siege of Xerigordos in September. Thereafter, two Turkish spies spread a rumor among the Crusaders that this group of Germans had also taken Nicaea; this made the main camp of Crusaders in Civetot eager to share in the looting of that city as soon as possible. Turkish forces waited on the road to Nicaea. Peter the Hermit, the nominal leader of the crusade, had gone back to Constantinople to arrange for supplies and was due back soon, and most of the remaining leaders argued that it would be better to wait for him to return (which he never did). Geoffrey Burel, who had taken command, argued that it would be cowardly to wait and that they should move against the Turks right away. His will prevailed, and on the morning of 21 October, the entire army of over 20,000 marched out toward Nicaea, leaving women, children, the old and the sick behind at the camp.

== Battle and aftermath ==
Three miles from the camp, where the road entered a narrow, wooded valley near the village of Dracon, the Turkish army of Kilij Arslan I was waiting. When approaching the valley, the Crusaders marched noisily and were quickly subjected to a hail of arrows. Panic set in immediately, and within minutes the army was in full rout back to the camp. Most of the crusaders were slaughtered (upwards of 60,000 by some accounts), including women, children and other non-combatants; only young girls, nuns and boys that could be sold as slaves were taken alive (the Princes' Crusade later liberated some of these close to Antioch). One of the leaders of the crusade, the knight Walter Sans Avoir, was killed in the action. Three thousand, including Burel, were able to obtain refuge in an abandoned castle. Eventually, the Byzantines under Constantine Katakalon sailed over and raised the siege; these few thousand returned to Constantinople, the only survivors of the People's Crusade.

After regrouping in Constantinople, the survivors joined with the "Princes" toward Palestine to take part in the First Crusade, with Peter the Hermit taking a more subordinate position in the new army.
