= Walter Sans Avoir =

Leader of the People's Crusade (d. 1096)

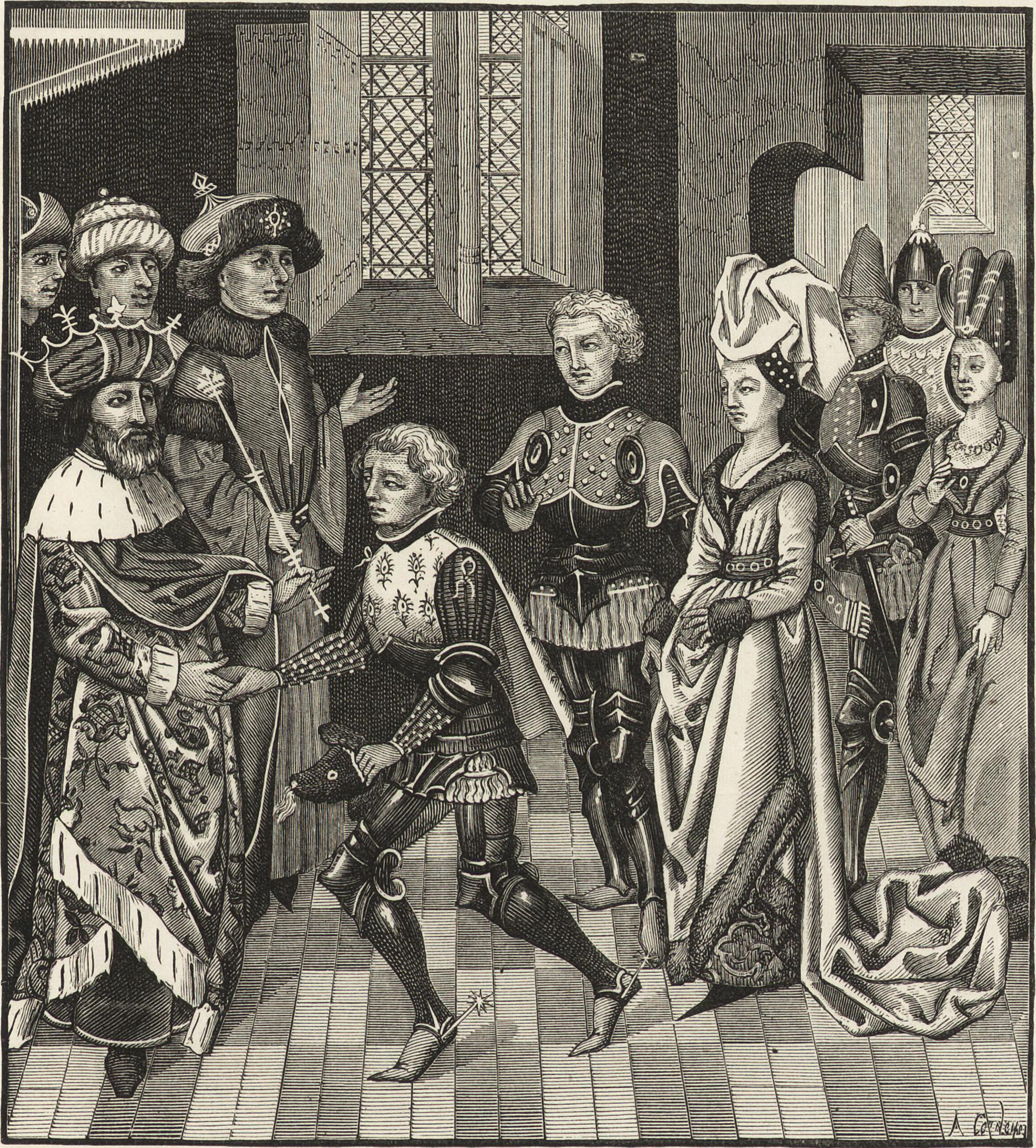
Reception of Walter Sans Avoir by the King of Hungary, who permitted him to pass through his territory with the Crusaders.

Walter Sans Avoir (in French Gautier Sans-Avoir; died 21 October 1096) was the lord of Boissy-sans-Avoir in the Île-de-France. His name is often mistranslated as Walter the Penniless. While the words in his name do literally mean "Walter without having", the name actually derives from that of his demesne (and, ultimately, the motto of his family), Sans avoir Peur ("Fearless"). As lieutenant to Peter the Hermit, he co-led the People's Crusade at the beginning of the First Crusade.

== Life and crusading ==
Leaving well before the main army of knights and their followers (the more famous "Princes' Crusade"), Walter led his small group of knights at the head of a mass of poorly-armed pilgrims through the Holy Roman Empire, the Kingdom of Hungary, and the Syrmian and Bulgarian provinces of the Eastern Roman Empire, traveling separately from Peter. They passed through Germany and Hungary uneventfully, but Walter's followers plundered the Belgrade area, drawing reprisals upon themselves. They continued to Constantinople under Byzantine escort.

Walter and Peter joined forces at Constantinople where Alexius I Comnenus provided transport across the Bosporus. Despite Peter's entreaties to restrain themselves, the Crusaders engaged the Turks at once and were cut to pieces. Peter had returned to Constantinople, either for reinforcements or to protect himself, but Walter was killed, allegedly pierced by seven arrows on 21 October 1096 when the Seljuk leader Kilij Arslan attacked him and his followers in the battle of Civetot.
