= People's Crusade =

Prelude to the First Crusade (April–October 1096)

- Part of the First Crusade
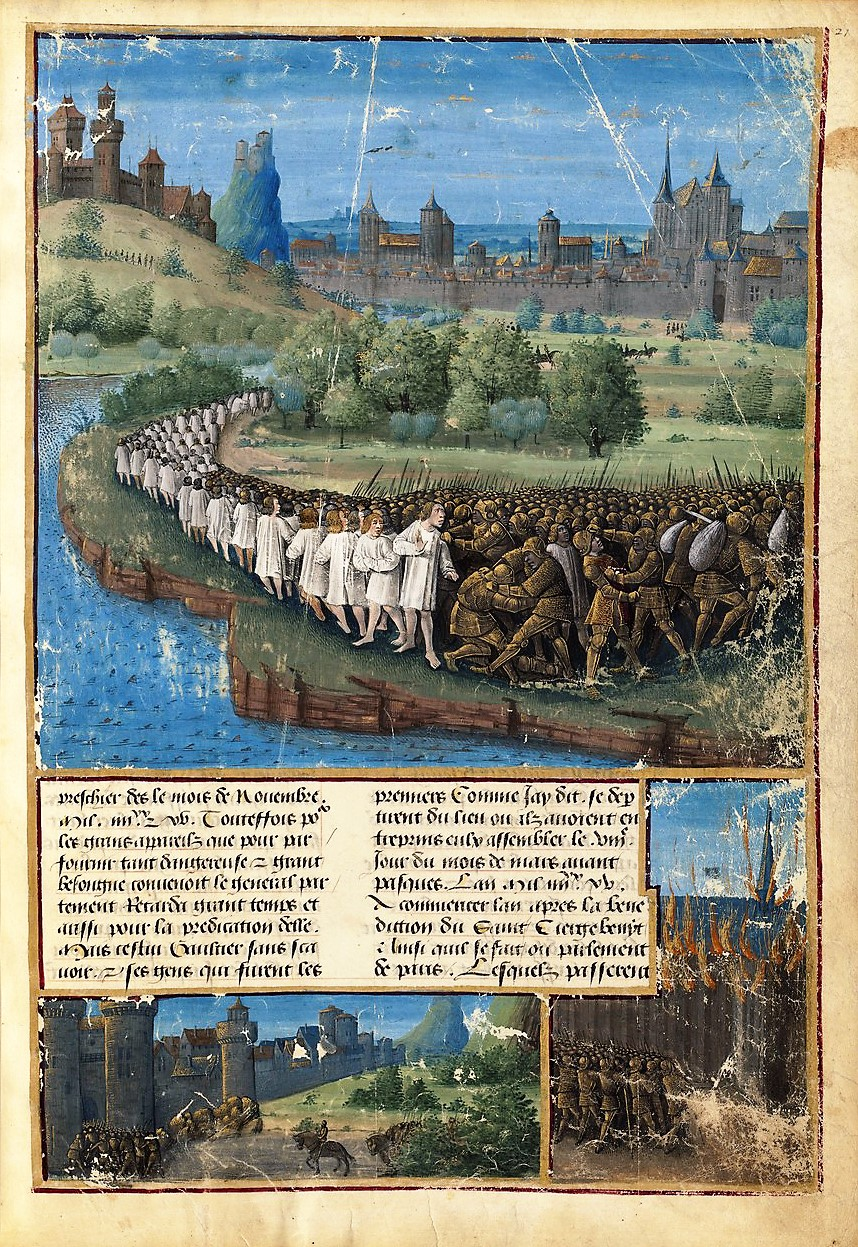
- The defeat of the People's Crusade; Illustration by Jean Colombe (from Passages d'outremer)
Date	April–October 1096
Location	Central Europe, Anatolia and Nicaea
Result	Seljuk victory; Fewer than 3,000 Crusaders survive; Most of the survivors captured and later enslaved

Belligerents
West European Catholics	Sultanate of Rum

Commanders and leaders
Peter the Hermit; Walter Sans Avoir †; Emicho of Flonheim; Volkmar †; Gottschalk †	Kilij Arslan I

Strength
20,000 crusaders (initially 40,000); Or up to 60,000	5,000 - 10,000, mix of infantry and cavalry

Casualties and losses
Extremely high; near-complete destruction	Relatively low

The People's Crusade was the initial phase of the First Crusade, which sought to retake the Holy Land, particularly Jerusalem, from Islamic rule. In 1095, after the head of the Catholic Church Pope Urban II started to urge faithful Christians to undertake an armed pilgrimage to Jerusalem, the People's Crusade was conducted for roughly six months from April to October 1096. It is also known as the Peasants' Crusade, Paupers' Crusade or the Popular Crusade as it was executed by a mainly untrained peasant army prior to the main church-organized crusade. It was led primarily by Peter the Hermit with forces of Walter Sans Avoir. During the crusade, bands of crusaders carried out the Rhineland massacres, a series of pogroms against Jewish communities in Central Europe. Thousands of Jews were killed or driven to suicide, while others were forcibly converted to Christianity. The peasant army of this crusade was largely destroyed by the forces of the Seljuk Turks under Kilij Arslan at the Battle of Civetot in northwestern Anatolia, though some survivors joined the armies of the Prince's Crusade in Constantinople.

The People's Crusade was the first, largest, and best documented of the popular crusades. The more official, fully church-backed "Princes' Crusade" began a few months later and was better organized, better armed, better funded, and ultimately successful.

== Background ==
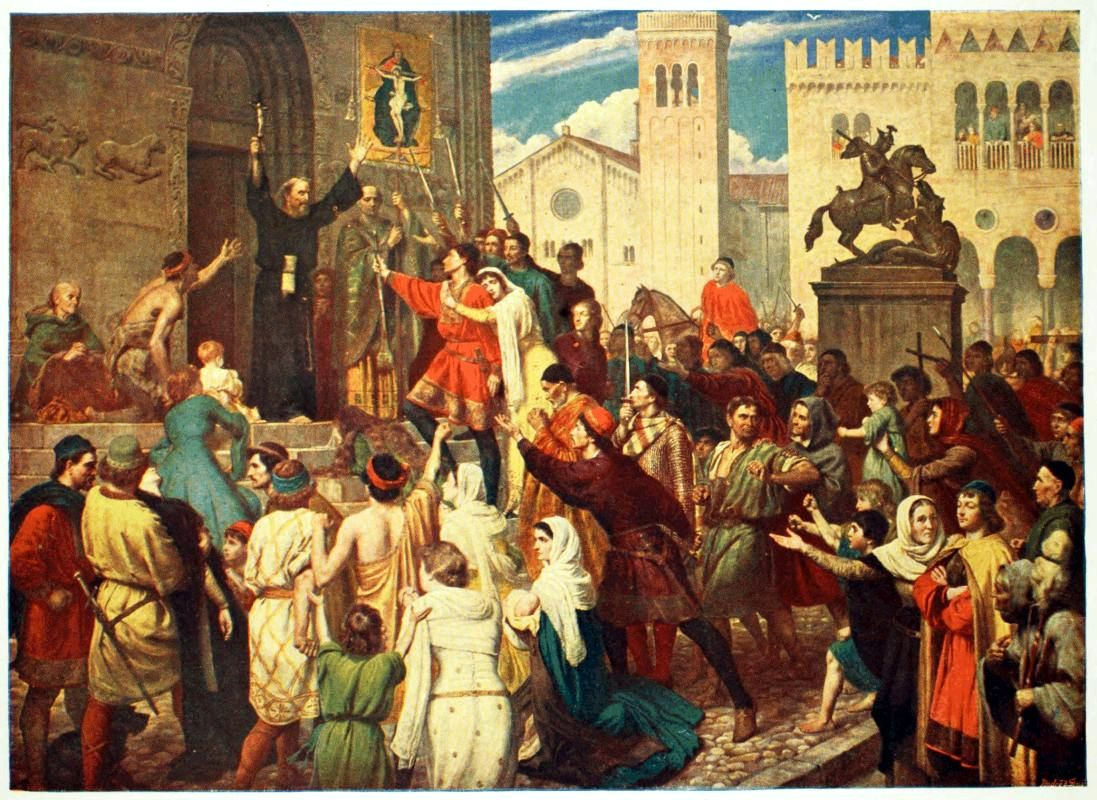
Peter the Hermit Preaching the First Crusade – from the painting by James Archer – from Cassell's History of England, Vol. I – anonymous author and artists

Calling for a crusade at the Council of Clermont in 1095, Pope Urban II planned the departure of the crusade for 15 August 1096. Nevertheless, a number of unexpected bands of peasants and low-ranking knights organized and set off for Jerusalem on their own. The peasant population had been afflicted by drought, famine, and disease for many years before 1096, and some of them seem to have envisioned the crusade as an escape from these hardships. Spurring them on had been a number of meteorological occurrences beginning in 1095 that seemed to be a divine blessing for the movement: a meteor shower, aurorae, a lunar eclipse, and a comet, among other events. An outbreak of ergotism had also occurred just before the Council of Clermont. Millenarianism, the belief that the end of the world was imminent, popular in the early 11th century, experienced a resurgence in popularity. The response was beyond expectations: while Urban might have expected a few thousand knights, he ended up with a migration numbering up to 100,000 Crusaders of mostly unskilled fighters, including women and children.

A charismatic monk and powerful orator named Peter the Hermit of Amiens was the spiritual leader of the movement. He was known for riding a donkey and dressing in simple clothing. He had vigorously preached the crusade throughout northern France and Flanders. He claimed to have been appointed to preach by Christ himself (and supposedly had a divine letter to prove it), and it is likely that some of his followers thought he, not Urban, was the true originator of the crusading idea. It is often believed that Peter's army was a band of illiterate, incompetent peasants who had no idea where they were going, and who believed that every city of any size they encountered on their way was Jerusalem itself. This may have been true for some, but the long tradition of pilgrimages to Jerusalem ensured that the location and distance of the city were well known. While the majority were unskilled in fighting, there were some well-trained minor knights leading them, such as Walter Sans-Avoir (also mistakenly known as Walter the Penniless), who was experienced in warfare. (Note: A list of known members of Peter's army can be found in Riley-Smith, et al., A Database of Crusaders to the Holy Land.)

== Massacre of Jews in Central Europe ==
In the late spring and summer of 1096, crusaders destroyed most of the Jewish communities along the Rhine in a series of unprecedentedly large pogroms in France and Germany in which thousands of Jews were massacred, driven to suicide, or forced to convert to Christianity. Twelve Jews were murdered in Speyer, where the Bishop saved the rest of the Jews, but in the Worms massacre some 800 were murdered. In Mainz, over 1,000 Jews were murdered, as well as more in Trier, Metz, Cologne, and elsewhere. Others were subjected to forced baptism and conversion. The preacher Folkmar and Emicho of Flonheim were the main inciters and leaders of the massacre. The major chroniclers of the 1096 killings are Solomon bar Simson and Albert of Aachen. In Prague, the army of Volkmar slaughtered the city's Jewish citizens and were subsequently defeated by the Kingdom of Hungary for their violence.

Estimates of the number of Jewish men, women, and children murdered or driven to suicide by crusaders vary, ranging from 2,000 to 12,000. Norman Cohn puts the number at between 4,000 and 8,000 from May to June 1096. Gedaliah ibn Yahya estimated that some 5,000 Jews were killed from April to June 1096. Edward H. Flannery's estimate is that 10,000 were murdered over the longer January-to-July period, "probably one-fourth to one-third of the Jewish population of Germany and Northern France at that time." The clergy and nobility of Europe condemned the killing of Jews, and forbade it on subsequent crusades.

== Walter and the French ==
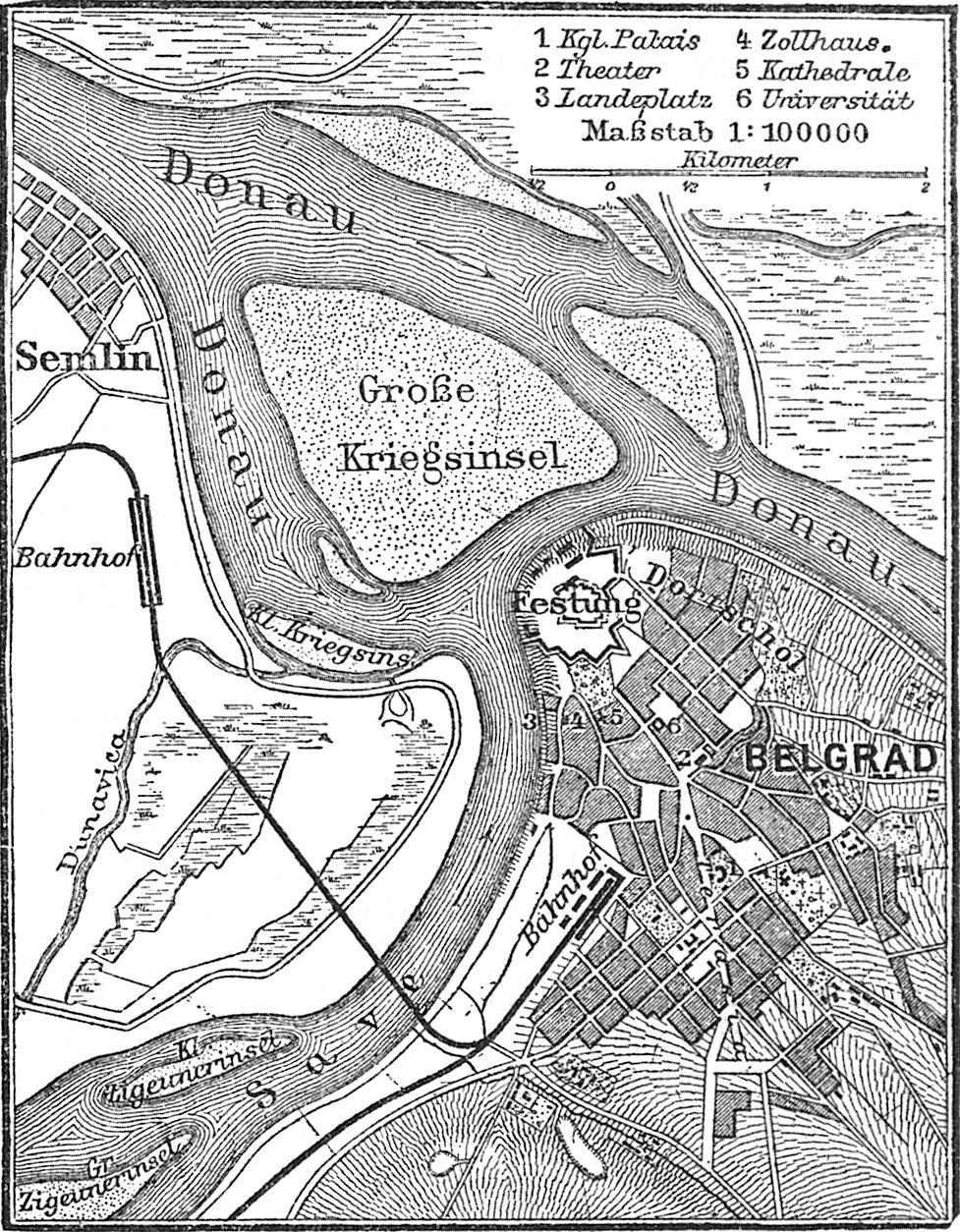
1890 map showing proximity of Zemun (Semlin), river Sava and Belgrade.

Peter gathered his army at Cologne on 12 April 1096, planning to stop there and preach to the Germans and gather more crusaders.

The French, however, were not willing to wait for Peter and the Germans and under the leadership of Walter Sans Avoir, a few thousand French crusaders left before Peter and reached Hungary on 8 May, passing through Hungary without incident and arriving at the river Sava at the border of the Byzantine territory at Belgrade. The Belgrade commander was taken by surprise, having no orders on what to do with them, and refused entry, forcing the crusaders to pillage the countryside for food.

This resulted in skirmishes with the Belgrade garrison and, to make matters worse, sixteen of Walter's men had tried to rob a market in Zemun across the river in Hungary and were stripped of their armor and clothing, which was hung from the castle walls. Eventually the crusaders were allowed to carry on to Niš, where they were provided with food and waited to hear from Constantinople.

== Cologne to Constantinople ==
Peter and the remaining crusaders left Cologne about 20 April. About 40,000 Crusaders departed immediately. Another group would follow soon after; this group committed the Rhineland massacres against Jewish populations and is sometimes referred to as the "German Crusade of 1096". When they reached the Danube, part of the army decided to continue on by boat down the Danube, while the main body continued overland and entered Hungary at Sopron. There it continued through Hungary without incident and rejoined the Danube contingent at Zemun on the Byzantine frontier.

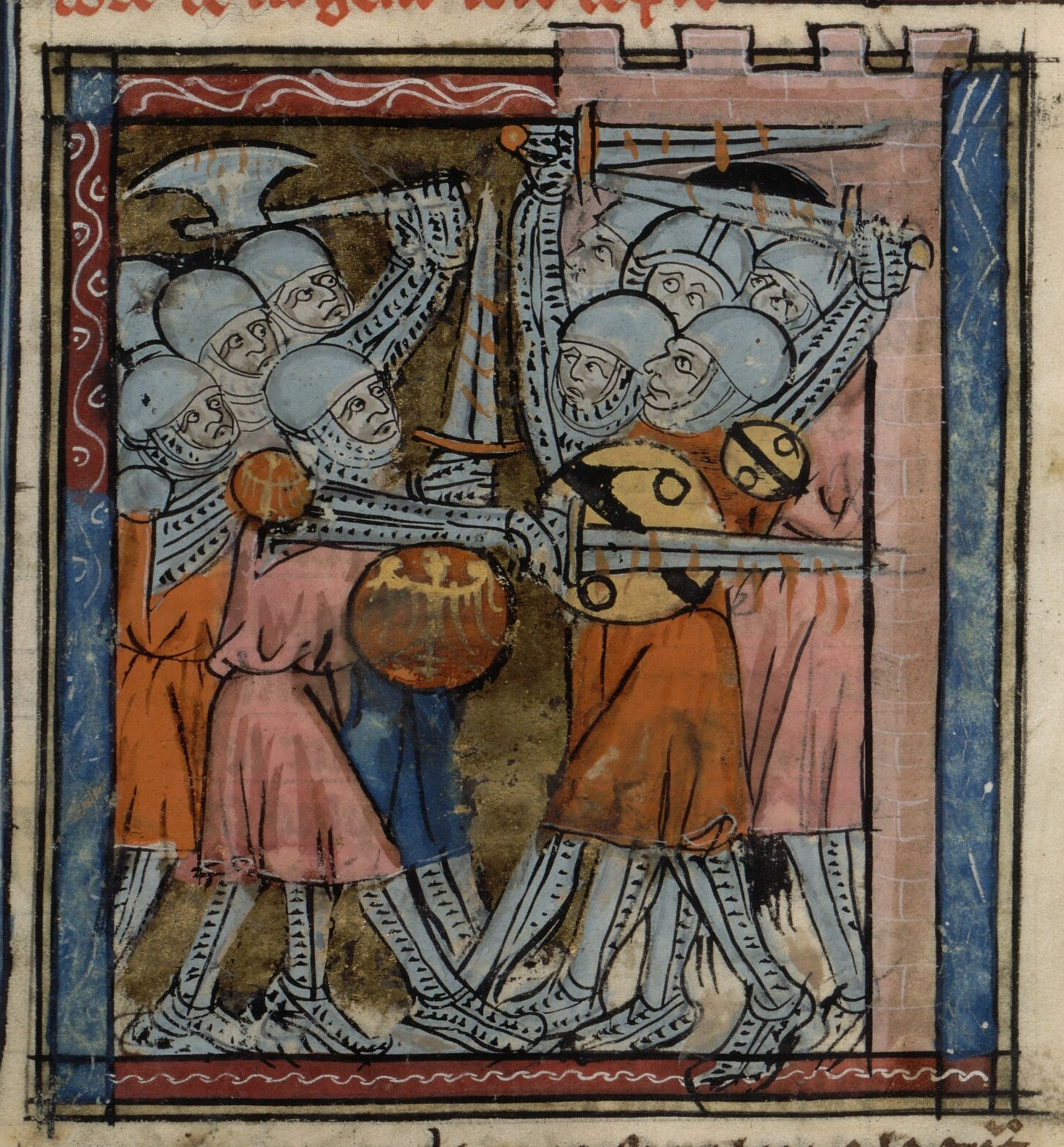
Siege of Niš on 4 July 1096

In Zemun, the crusaders became suspicious, seeing Walter's sixteen suits of armor hanging from the walls, and eventually a dispute over the price of a pair of shoes in the market led to a riot, which then turned into an all-out assault on the city by the crusaders, in which 4,000 Hungarians were killed. The crusaders then fled across the river Sava to Belgrade, but only after skirmishing with Belgrade troops. The residents of Belgrade fled, and the crusaders pillaged and burned the city. Then they marched for seven days, arriving at Niš on 3 July. There, the commander of Niš promised to provide escort for Peter's army to Constantinople as well as food, if he would leave right away. Peter obliged, and the next morning he set out. However, a few Germans got into a dispute with some locals along the road and set fire to a mill, which escalated out of Peter's control until Niš sent out its entire garrison against the crusaders.

The crusaders were completely routed, losing about 10,000 (a quarter of their number), the remainder regrouping further on at Bela Palanka. When they reached Sofia on 12 July they met their Byzantine escort, which brought them safely the rest of the way to Constantinople by 1 August.

== Leadership breakdown ==
Byzantine emperor Alexius I Komnenus, not knowing what else to do with such an unusual and unexpected army, quickly ferried all 30,000 across the Bosporus by 6 August. It has since been debated whether he sent them away without Byzantine guides knowing full well that they could be slaughtered by the Turks, or whether they insisted on continuing into Asia Minor despite his warnings. In any case, it is known that Alexius warned Peter not to engage the Turks, whom he believed to be superior to Peter's motley army, and to wait for the main body of crusaders, which was still on the way.

Peter was rejoined by the French under Walter Sans Avoir and a number of bands of Italian crusaders who had arrived at the same time. Once in Asia Minor, they began to pillage towns and villages until they reached Nicomedia, where an argument broke out between the Germans and Italians on one side and the French on the other. The Germans and Italians split off and elected a new leader, an Italian named Rainald, while for the French, Geoffrey Burel took command. Peter had effectively lost control of the crusade.

Even though Alexius had urged Peter to wait for the main army, Peter had lost much of his authority and the crusaders spurred each other on, moving more boldly against nearby towns until finally the French reached the edge of Nicaea, a Seljuk stronghold and provincial capital, where they pillaged the suburbs. The Germans, not to be outdone, marched with 6,000 crusaders on Xerigordos and captured the fortress to use as a base to raid the countryside. In response, the Turks, led by one of Kilij Arslan's generals, defeated the crusaders at the Siege of Xerigordos, many of whom were forced to drink the blood of donkeys and their own urine during the siege, since their water supply was cut. Some of the crusaders who were captured converted to Islam and were sent to Khorasan, while others who refused to abandon their faith were killed.

== Civetot and downfall ==
Back at the main crusaders' camp, two Turkish spies had spread rumors that the Germans who had taken Xerigordos had also taken Nicaea, which caused excitement to get there as soon as possible to share in the looting. The Turks were waiting on the road to Nicaea. Peter the Hermit had gone back to Constantinople to arrange for supplies and was due back soon, and most of the leaders argued to wait for him to return (which he never did). However, Geoffrey Burel, who had popular support among the masses, argued that it would be cowardly to wait, and they should move against the Turks right away. His will prevailed and, on the morning of 21 October, the entire army of 20,000 marched out toward Nicaea, leaving women, children, the old, and the sick behind at the camp.

Three miles from the camp, where the road entered a narrow, wooded valley near the village of Dracon, the Turkish army was waiting. When approaching the valley, the crusaders marched noisily and were quickly subjected to a hail of arrows. Panic set in immediately and within minutes, the army was in full rout back to the camp. Most of the crusaders were slaughtered, including Walter Sans Avoir. According to the 11th-century account of Albert of Aix, most of the non-combatants left behind at the camp were also slaughtered, with only young women, nuns, and young boys taken alive as slaves. Three thousand, including Geoffrey Burel, were able to obtain refuge in an abandoned castle. Eventually the Byzantines under Constantine Katakalon sailed over and raised the siege; these few thousand returned to Constantinople, the only survivors of the People's Crusade.

== Survivors and the Princes' Crusade ==
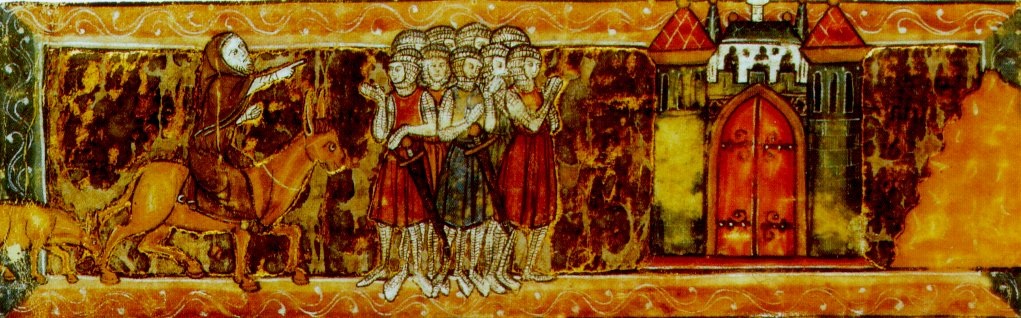
Peter the Hermit shows the crusaders the way to Jerusalem. French illumination, c. 1270.

Wintering in Constantinople, the People's Crusade abandoned hopes of Byzantine support and awaited the incoming Crusader armies. While the People’s Crusade was never replenished to its original numbers after the Battle of Civetot, disarmed, injured, or bankrupted crusaders joined the army of Peter the Hermit, which continued on toward Palestine to aid the “princes” in the First Crusade.
