= Vanishing island =

Island submerged at high tide

A diagram of a vanishing island at low and high tide.

Vanishing island refers to any permanent island which is exposed at low tide but is submerged at high tide. Vanishing islands occur globally. There are vanishing islands in the Philippines and several in the San Juan Islands.

In early times, seamen were confused by this phenomenon and invented explanations for it, usually involving a massive sea monster that would let a crew land on its back before submersing itself, drowning the crew. Notable examples of these are the aspidochelone, Fastitocalon, Jasconius, Lyngbakr, Hafgufa, and various accounts of the kraken.

The phrase is sometimes incorrectly used to refer to islands which may be permanently lost due to climate change.

== See also ==
- Tidal island
