= Tolkien and the medieval =

Effect on Tolkien's legendarium

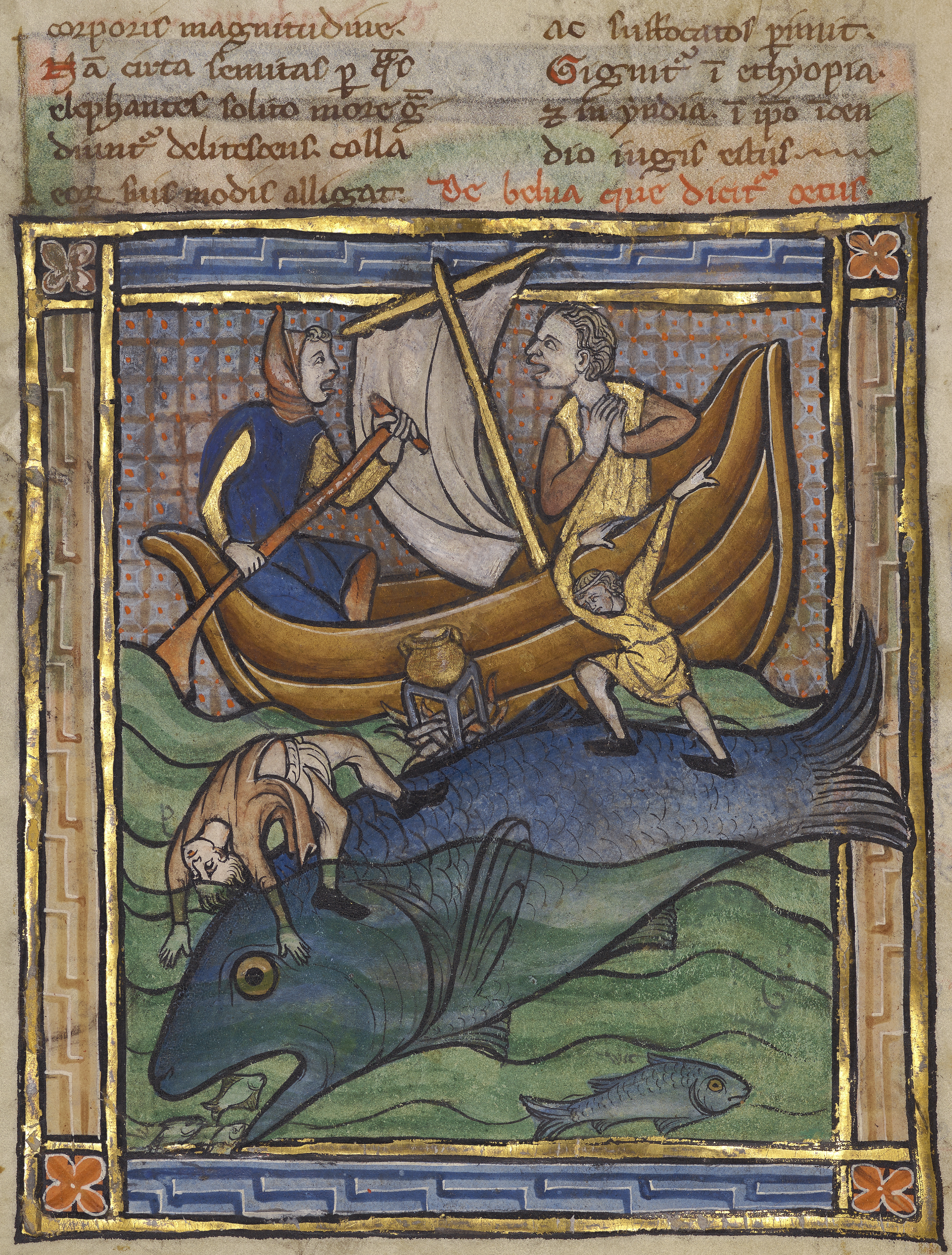
Tolkien enjoyed medieval works like Fastitocalon, and often imitated them in his poetry, in this case in a poem of the same name. French manuscript, c. 1270

J. R. R. Tolkien was attracted to medieval literature, and made use of it in his writings, both in his poetry, which contained numerous pastiches of medieval verse, and in his Middle-earth novels where he embodied a wide range of medieval concepts.

Tolkien's prose adopts medieval ideas for much of its structure and content. The Lord of the Rings is interlaced in medieval style. The Silmarillion has a medieval cosmology. The Lord of the Rings makes use of many borrowings from Beowulf, especially in the culture of the Riders of Rohan, as well as medieval weapons and armour, feudal allegiance, heraldry, languages including Old English and Old Norse, and magic.

== Context ==
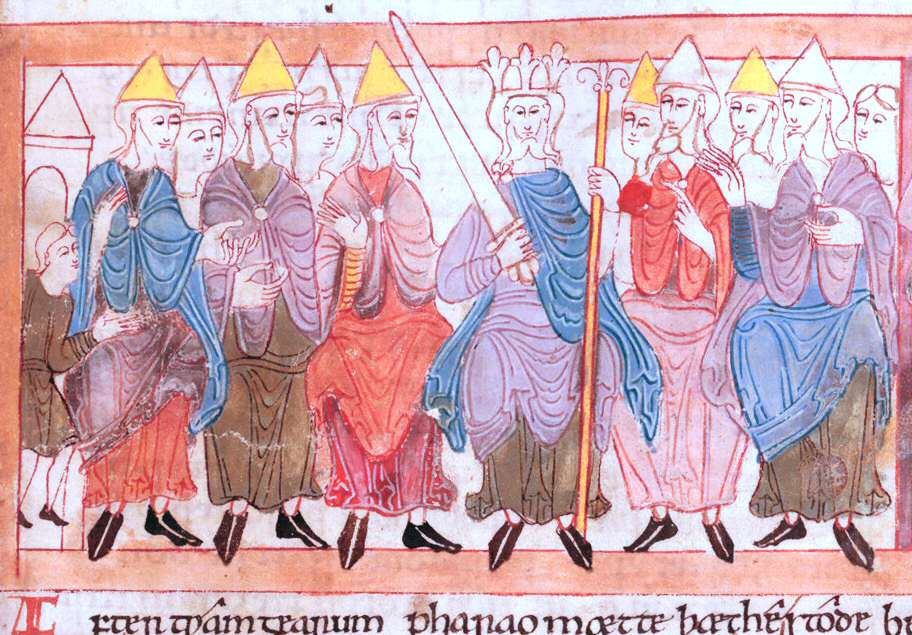
Of all medieval cultures, Tolkien was most familiar with that of the Anglo-Saxons. 11th-century illustration of a king and his council.

=== The Middle Ages ===
In the history of Europe, the Middle Ages or medieval period lasted approximately from the 5th to the late 15th centuries, similarly to the Post-classical period of global history. It began with the fall of the Western Roman Empire and transitioned into the Renaissance and the Age of Discovery. In the Early Middle Ages, the End of Roman rule in Britain c. 400 was soon followed by the Anglo-Saxon settlement of Britain. By the sixth century, Anglo-Saxon England, "the bit [of Medieval culture] that Tolkien knew best", consisted of many small kingdoms including Northumbria, Mercia, and East Anglia, engaged in ongoing warfare with each other.

=== Tolkien the medievalist ===
J. R. R. Tolkien was a scholar of English literature, a philologist and medievalist interested in language and poetry from the Middle Ages, especially that of Anglo-Saxon England and Northern Europe. His professional knowledge of works such as Beowulf and Sir Gawain and the Green Knight shaped his fictional world of Middle-earth. His intention to create what has been called "a mythology for England" (Note: Carpenter 1981, #131 to Milton Waldman, late 1951.) led him to construct not only stories but a fully formed world with its own languages, peoples, cultures, and history, based on medieval languages including Old English, Old Norse, and Old High German, and detailed knowledge of medieval culture and mythology.

== Medieval themes in Middle-earth ==
=== Poetry ===
The Riders of Rohan lament for Théoden

We `heard of the `horns in the `hills `ringing,
the `swords `shining in the `South-`kingdom.
`Steeds went `striding to the `Stoning`land
as `wind in the `morning. `War was `kindled.
There `Théoden `fell, `Thengling `mighty,
to his `golden `halls and `green `pastures
in the `Northern `fields `never `returning,
`high lord of the `host.

— from "The Mounds of Mundburg" (Note: Tolkien 1955, book 5, chapter 6, "The Battle of the Pelennor Fields".)

Tolkien stated that whenever he read a medieval work, he wanted to write a modern one in the same tradition. He constantly created these, whether pastiches and parodies like "Fastitocalon"; adaptations in medieval metres, like "The Lay of Aotrou and Itroun" or "asterisk texts" like his "The Man in the Moon Stayed Up Too Late" (from "Hey Diddle Diddle"); and finally "new wine in old bottles" such as "The Nameless Land" and Aelfwine's Annals. The works are extremely varied, but all are "suffused with medieval borrowings", making them, according to the Tolkien scholar John D. Rateliff, "most readers' portal into medieval literature". Not all found use in Middle-earth, but they all helped Tolkien develop a medieval-style craft that found expression in his legendarium. One of the most distinctively medieval poems in The Lord of the Rings is the Riders of Rohan's Old English-style lament for Théoden, written in what Tolkien called "the strictest form of Anglo-Saxon alliterative verse", complete with balanced half-lines separated by a caesura, each half-line with two stresses, and a varying pattern of alliteration and use of multiple names for the same person.

=== Cosmology ===
The history of Middle-earth attempted to combine classical, medieval, and modern notions by means of violent transitions from one cosmology to another, such as the Atlantis-like downfall of Númenor that reshaped the flat medieval earth into a modern round world.

The cosmology of Middle-earth contains many medieval elements, but these are interwoven both with classical ideas like Atlantis, and modern cosmology with a round world. Tolkien was trying to reconcile different conceptions of the world, including the medieval Germanic migrations and the culture of Anglo-Saxon England, to create his mythology. The world of Middle-earth is overseen by the godlike Valar, who resemble the medieval Norse Æsir, the gods of Asgard. They function in some ways like angels in Christianity, mediating between the creator, named as Eru Ilúvatar, and the created world. They have free will, so that the Satanic Vala Melkor is able to rebel against the will of Eru.

=== Beowulf ===
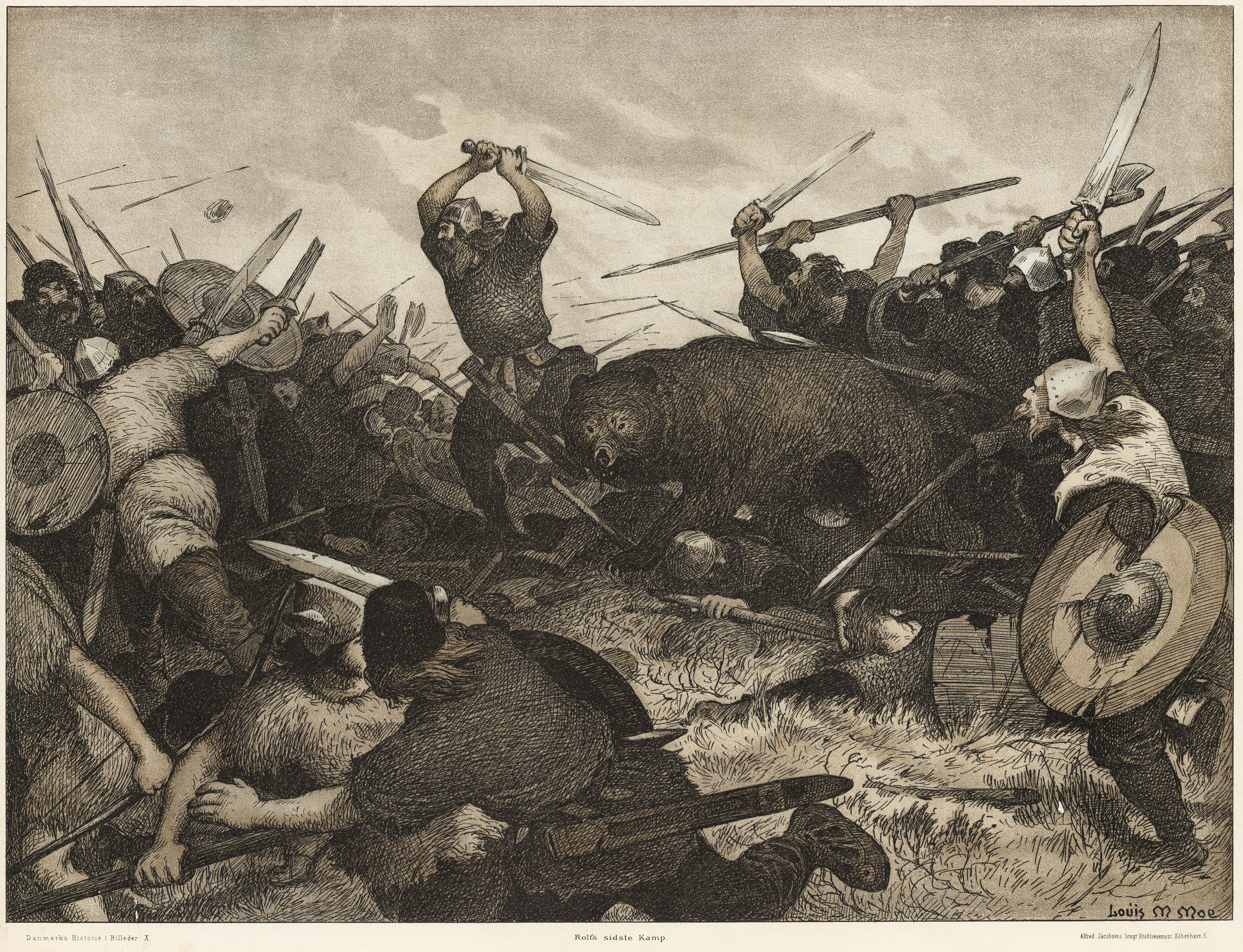
Beowulfian: Bödvar Bjarki shifts shape to fight in the form of a bear, as Tolkien's Beorn does. Painting by Louis Moe, 1898

J. R. R. Tolkien drew on the medieval Old English poem Beowulf for multiple aspects of Middle-earth: for elements such as names, monsters, the importance of luck and courage, and the structure of society in a heroic and pagan age; for aspects of style, such as creating an impression of depth and adopting an elegiac tone; and for its larger but hidden symbolism.

He derived the names of Middle-earth races including Ents, Orcs, and Elves, and names such as Orthanc and Saruman, rather directly from Beowulf. The were-bear Beorn in The Hobbit has been likened to the hero Beowulf himself; both names mean "bear", and both characters have enormous strength. Scholars have compared some of Tolkien's monsters to those in Beowulf. Both his trolls and Gollum share attributes with Grendel, while Smaug's characteristics closely match those of the Beowulf dragon. Tolkien's Riders of Rohan are distinctively Old English, and he has made use of multiple elements of Beowulf in creating them, including their language, culture, and poetry.

Tolkien admired the way that Beowulf, written by a Christian looking back at a pagan past, as he himself was, embodied a "large symbolism" without ever becoming allegorical. That symbolism, of life's road and individual heroism, and that avoidance of allegory, Tolkien worked to echo in The Lord of the Rings.

=== Weapons and armour ===
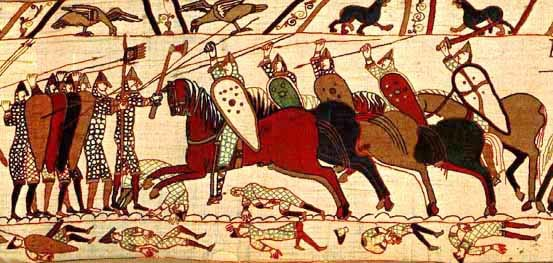
Tolkien stated that the styles of the Bayeux Tapestry fitted the Rohirrim "well enough". (Note: Carpenter 1981, #211.)

Tolkien's modelled his fictional warfare on the tactics and equipment of the Ancient and Early Medieval periods. His depictions of weapons and armour are based in particular on the Northern European culture of Beowulf and the Norse sagas. As in his sources, Tolkien's weapons are often named, sometimes with runic inscriptions to show they are magical and have their own history and power. In Tolkien's writings, as in the medieval epics, one weapon, the sword, announces a hero; his fate and the fate of his sword are linked closely together.

=== Feudal allegiance ===
Feudal allegiance was central to some societies in the Middle Ages. The theme allows Tolkien to structure a complex set of relationships, to illustrate the medieval ideals of selfless courage through loyalty to one's lord, and to contrast pairs of characters, such as Théoden King of Rohan and Denethor steward of Gondor, according to how they handle these relationships.

=== Heraldry ===
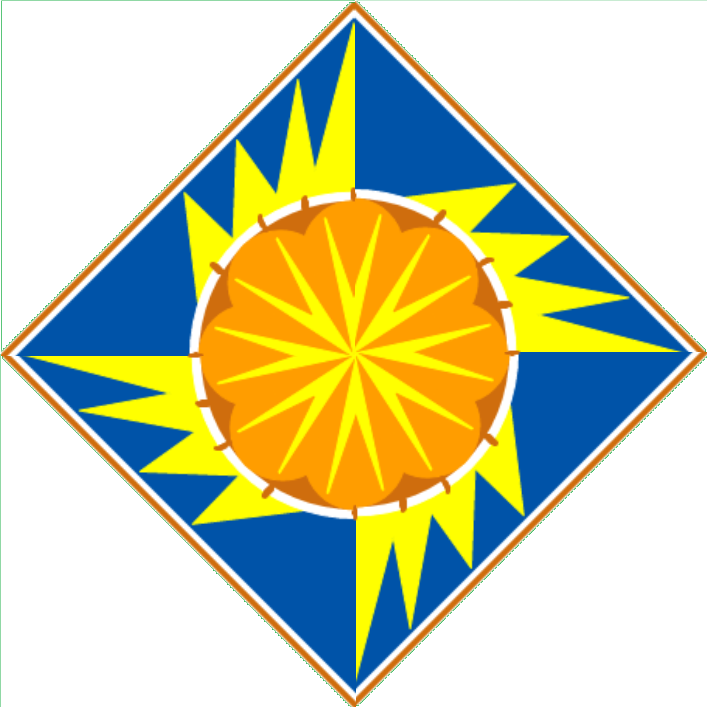
Elvish heraldry: the lozenge of Finwë, High King of the Ñoldor

Heraldry is a medieval system, by origin military, for displaying each knight or lord's identity. Tolkien invented quasi-medieval heraldic devices for many of the characters and nations of Middle-earth. His descriptions were in simple English rather than in specific blazon language. The emblems correspond in nature to their bearers, and their diversity contributes to the richly detailed realism of his writings. Scholars note that Tolkien went through different phases in his use of heraldry; his early account of the Elvish heraldry of Gondolin in The Book of Lost Tales corresponds broadly to heraldic tradition in the choice of emblems and colours. Later, when he wrote The Lord of the Rings, he was freer in his approach; and in the complex use of symbols for Aragorn's sword and banner, he clearly departs from medieval tradition to suit his storytelling.

=== Languages ===
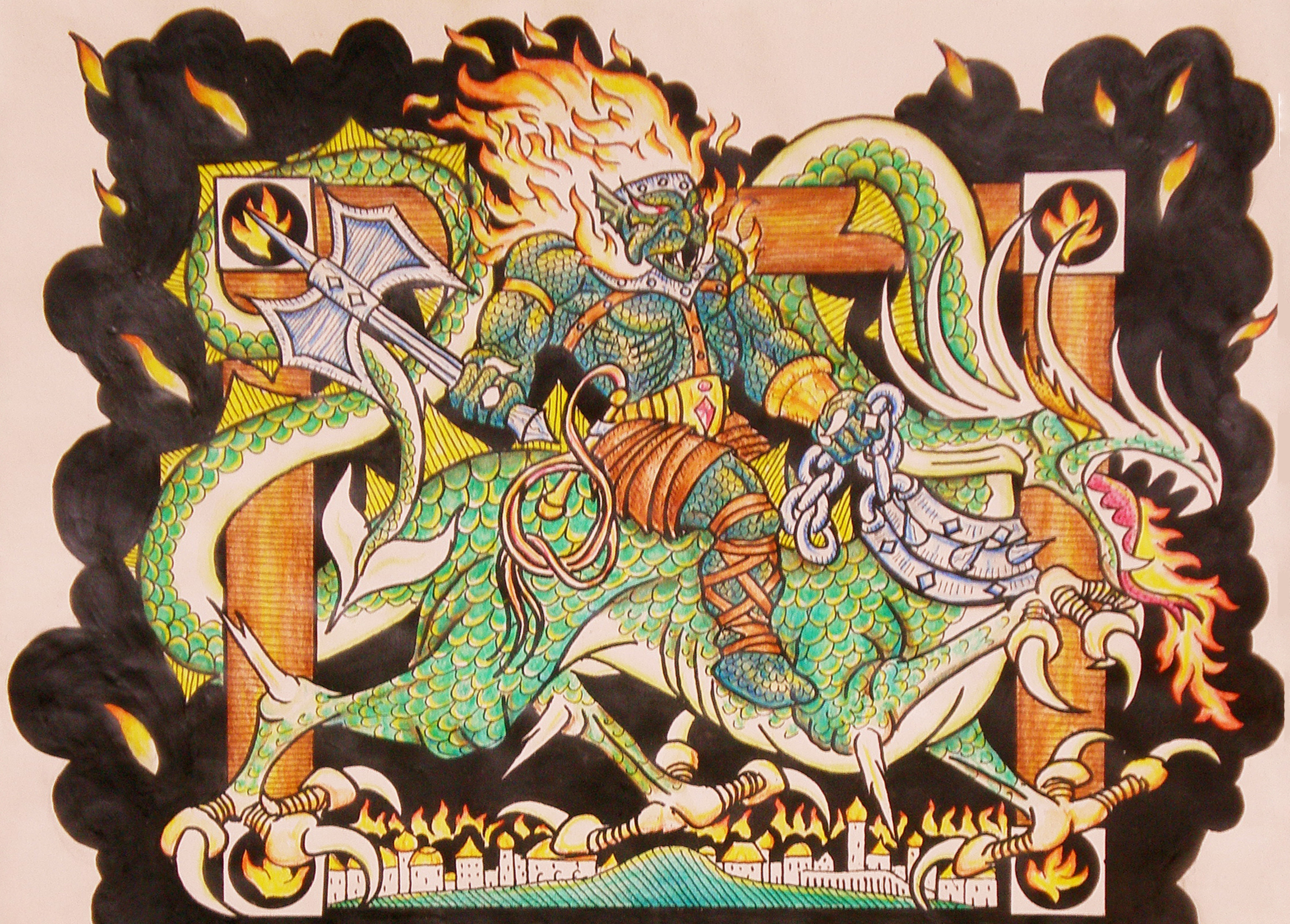
Tolkien likely based his Balrog fire-demons on his professional study of the Old English word Sigelwara.

Using his knowledge of medieval languages including Old English and Old Norse, Tolkien created his own languages for Middle-earth. (Note: Carpenter 1981, #163 to W. H. Auden, 7 June 1955) An item that the philologist and Tolkien scholar Tom Shippey suggests may have been crucial in his creation is the Old English word Sigelwara, found in the Codex Junius to mean "Aethiopian". Tolkien wondered why there should have been a word with this meaning, and after some years of research suggested it could be derived from Sigel, meaning both sun and jewel, and *hearwa, perhaps meaning soot, giving a conjectural original meaning for Sigelwara as "soot-black fire-demon". The Tolkien scholar Tom Shippey links this to the Balrog fire-demon and the Silmaril sun-jewels.

=== Magic ===
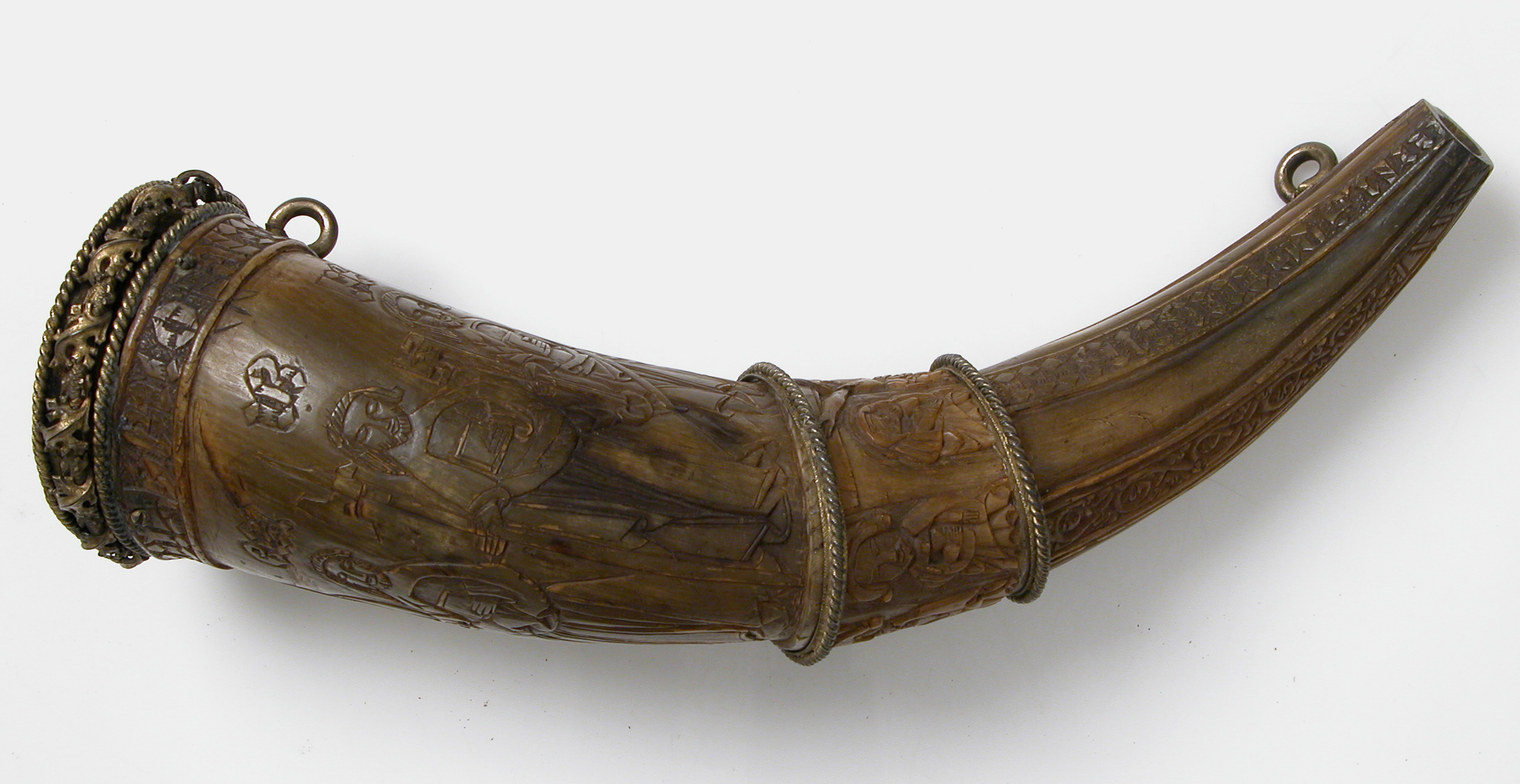
Merry's magic horn brought joy and cleansing to the Shire.

Middle-earth is pervaded with medieval-style magic, its races such as Wizards, Elves, and Dwarves each possessing their own inherent powers, which they could embody in magical artefacts such as a wizard's staff, Elvish waybread, and rings of power. Magical beasts derived directly from medieval concepts include dragons with their hoards of gold, birds such as crows and ravens carrying omens, and the ability to shapeshift into the form of an animal, like Beorn and the great fighting bear of The Hobbit. Norse mythology is rich in seeresses, dwarves, giants, and other monsters. The medieval world held that plants and other objects had magical powers. Tolkien absorbed all of these ideas and reworked them for his version of Middle-earth. Thus for example the Hobbit Merry returns from Rohan with a magic horn, brought from the North by Eorl the Young, from the dragon-hoard of Scatha the Worm. Blowing it brings joy to his friends in arms, fear to his enemies, and it awakens the Hobbits to purify the Shire of Saruman's ruffians. The Two Trees of Valinor derive from the magical medieval Trees of the Sun and the Moon. The two magical trees drip a wonderful balsam, and have the power of speech. They tell Alexander the Great that he will die in Babylon. Tolkien has adapted the story; his trees emit light, not balsam; and instead of prophesying death, their own deaths bring the era of immortality to an end.

=== Interlacing ===
The Lord of the Rings has an unusual and complex medieval narrative structure, interlacing or entrelacement, in which multiple threads of story are maintained side by side. It was used especially in French medieval literature such as the 13th century Queste del Saint Graal, and in English literature such as Beowulf and The Faerie Queene. Tolkien uses this medieval-style framework to achieve a variety of literary effects, including maintaining suspense, keeping the reader uncertain of what will happen and even of what is happening to other characters at the same time in the story; creating surprise and an ongoing feeling of bewilderment and disorientation. More subtly, the leapfrogging of the timeline by the different story threads allows Tolkien to make hidden connections that can only be grasped retrospectively, as the reader realises on reflection that certain events happened at the same time, and that these connections imply a contest of good and evil powers.

=== Heroic romance ===
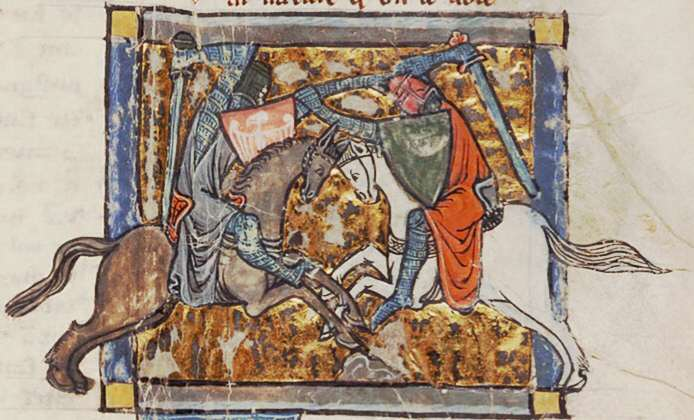
The Lord of the Rings uses many themes of medieval romance (Yvain, le Chevalier au Lion illustrated), such as heroism and interlacing.

Tolkien described The Lord of the Rings not as a novel but as a heroic romance, meaning that it embodied medieval concepts unfamiliar or unfashionable in the 20th century, such as the hero, the quest, and interlacing. A traditional romance, according to the critic Northrop Frye, has six phases: the hero's strange birth – Frodo's parents both drown; his innocent youth – in the countryside of the Shire for Frodo, in Rivendell for Aragorn; the quest – for Frodo to destroy the Ring, for Aragorn to regain his Kingdom; confrontation with evil, as in Minas Tirith and the Battle of the Pelennor Fields; in the re-establishment of happiness, marriage, and fertility – Aragorn marries Arwen, Faramir marries Éowyn, Sam marries Rosie; and finally, the contemplative or penseroso phase, as characters depart or settle down – Frodo takes ship into the West, Sam becomes Mayor and has many children, Aragorn governs Gondor and Arnor as King.

Elena Capra writes that Tolkien made use of the medieval poem Sir Orfeo, both for The Hobbit's Elvish kingdom, and for his story in The Silmarillion of Beren and Lúthien. That in turn influenced his "Tale of Aragorn and Arwen". In Capra's view, Sir Orfeo's key ingredient was the political connection "between the recovery of the main character's beloved and the return to royal responsibility." Sir Orfeo is in its turn a reworking of the classical legend of Orpheus and Eurydice.

=== Exile ===
Yvette Kisor writes that Tolkien made repeated use of the Old English theme of exile, seen in poems such as The Wanderer, Genesis, and Beowulf. She gives as examples Aragorn, rightful King of Gondor and Arnor, living in the wild; Frodo, who exclaims "But this would mean exile, a flight from danger into danger, drawing it after me"; the Númenóreans, the survivors of the destruction of their Atlantis-like land, living in Middle-earth; and the Noldor Elves, living across the sea from Valinor. She notes that Tolkien never describes the monster Gollum as an exile, commenting however that he meets Stanley Greenfield's four characteristics of an Old English exile. Among the numerous parallels, Kisor notes that "wretch", used repeatedly by Gandalf, Frodo, and Sam to describe Gollum, comes directly from Old English wreċċa, meaning "exile"; Old English poetry frequently, she states, uses wineléas wreċċa, "friendless exile".

Yvette Kisor's analysis of Gollum as an Old English-style exile
Characteristics Stanley Greenfield	Gollum The Lord of the Rings
The exile's status	Gandalf says "He is very old and very wretched."
The exile's state of mind	Gollum says "Poor hungry Sméagol."
The exile's journey	Gandalf says "He wandered in loneliness, weeping a little for the hardness of the world."
The exile's expression of deprivation	Gollum says "Poor, poor Sméagol, he went away long ago. They took his Precious, and he's lost now."
