= Orlando Ferguson =

American flat Earth mapper (1846–1911)

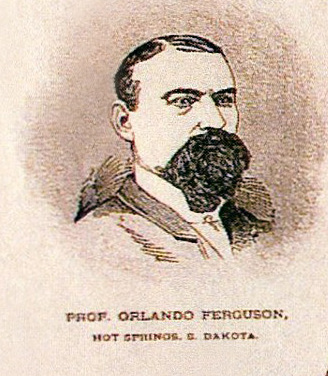
Image of Orlando Ferguson on his map of the Flat Earth

Orlando Ferguson (November 6, 1846 – February 3, 1911) was an American businessman who argued in favor of the flat Earth.

== Biography ==
Ferguson was born near Du Quoin, Illinois, on November 6, 1846, and was raised in Illinois. He married Margaret Douglas, with whom he had six children, in Baldwin, Illinois, in 1872. They moved to Miner County in the Dakota Territory in the early 1880s, and then Hot Springs in 1886.

In Hot Springs, Ferguson ran a grocery store and hotel, but the hotel was destroyed in a fire. He started construction on the Siloam Springs and Sanitarium in 1893. While often referred to as "doctor", Ferguson was not a formal medical doctor or trained as such. The name came from the sick who visited the bath house. Ferguson also lived in Thermopolis, Wyoming, and San Diego.

Ferguson, who suffered from asthma, started suffering from a two year illness in 1909, and returned to Hot Springs on May 20, 1910. He died on February 3, 1911, in his daughter's house in Hot Springs.

== Flat Earth map ==
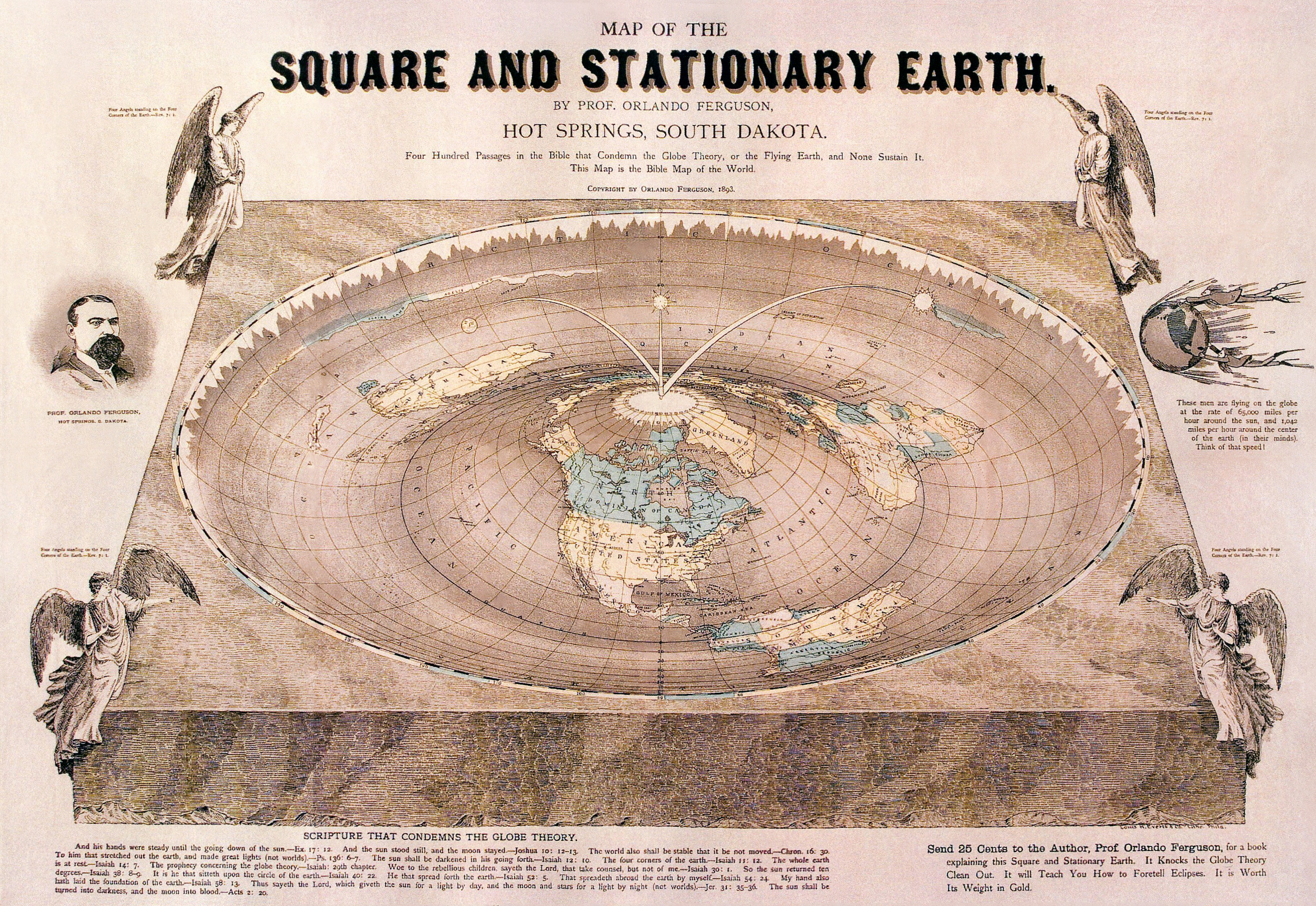
Flat Earth map drawn by Orlando Ferguson in 1893 and lithographed by Louis H. Everts & Co. The map contains several references to biblical passages as well as various attacks at the "Globe Theory".

Ferguson was a proponent of the Flat Earth and argued in favor of it using the Bible. He developed an idea of the world as square and stationary based on angels visiting the four corners of the world. This Earth was an inverse toroid.

Ferguson lectured about the idea to an audience in the Morris Opera House in Hot Springs in 1891, and wrote a 60 page pamphlet based on that lecture. He believed that the sun was 30 miles in diameter and 3,000 miles away from Earth. He rejected the idea of gravity and instead believed that the effects of gravity were the result of atmospheric pressure. Square World, a magazine promoting the flat Earth, was published by Ferguson in 1896.

A map depicting Ferguson's square and stationary Earth was printed in 1893 alongside a 92 page pamphlet. Don Homuth, a former member of the South Dakota Senate, received the map from his 8th grade history teacher, who received it from his grandfather. Homuth donated the map to the Library of Congress. Another copy of the map is held by the Pioneer Museum in Hot Springs.

== Works cited ==
- "Earth Is Square, Tiny Paper Says". South Bend News-Times. November 13, 1921. p. 18 – via Newspapers.com.
- "Orlando Ferguson Passed Away". Hot Springs Weekly Star. February 10, 1911. p. 7 – via Newspapers.com.
- "Two Old Timers Gone". Hot Springs Weekly Star. February 9, 1911. p. 1 – via Newspapers.com.
- Andrews, John (July 13, 2011). "Hot Springs' Square Thinker". South Dakota Magazine. Archived from the original on 29 December 2025.
- Jackson, Nicholas (June 22, 2011). "Library of Congress Receives Rare Map Depicting Earth as Flat". The Atlantic. Archived from the original on October 2, 2022.
- Wolchover, Natalie (June 23, 2011). "Ingenious 'Flat Earth' Theory Revealed In Old Map". NBC News. Archived from the original on 29 December 2025.
