= Hafgufa =

Sea monster in Nordic legend

Creature information
- Other name: Hafgufu (Old Norwegian)
- Grouping: Legendary creature
- Sub grouping: Sea monster

Origin
- Country: Greenland

Hafgufa (Old Norse: haf "sea" + Old Norse: gufa "steam"; (Note: Glossed as:"Hafgufa, vapor marinus".) "sea-reek"; (Note: "reek" is defined as 'vapor, smoke'.) "sea-steamer") is a sea creature, purported to inhabit Iceland's waters (Greenland Sea) and southward toward Helluland. Although it was thought to be a sea monster, research suggests that the stories originated from a specialized feeding technique among whales known as trap-feeding.

The hafgufa is mentioned in the mid-13th century Norwegian tract called the Konungs skuggsjá ("King's Mirror"). Later recensions of Örvar-Odds saga feature hafgufa and lyngbakr as similar but distinct creatures.

According to Norwegian didactic work, this creature uses its own vomit-like chumming-bait to gather prey-fish. In the Fornaldarsaga, the hafgufa is reputed to consume even whales or ships and men, though Oddr's ship merely sailed through its jaws above water, which appeared to be nothing more than rocks.

== Nomenclature ==
This creature's name appears as hafgufa in Old Norse in the 13th century Norwegian work. (Note: i.e., hafgufa recté hafgufa. It appears as hafgufu [sic.] in the original text,but that nominative is not used, but hafgufa is given instead by Finnur Jónsson in his commentary to his edition of Konungs skuggsjá.)

In the Snorra Edda, the hafgufa ("sea-steamer") appears in the list (þulur) of whales. The spelling is also hafgúa in some copies. An 18th-century source glosses the term margúa 'mermaid' as hafgúa. (Note: The source being Ann. =Íslandske Annaler indtil 1578.)

This was rendered "hafgufa ('[mermaid]')" in a recent excerpt of this work, but has been translated 'kraken' in the past. It was translated as "sea-reek" in the saga. (Note: First complete translation, by Edwards and Pálsson in 1970, though Jacqueline Simpson had published selections in 1965.)

== Norwegian King's Mirror ==
In the Speculum regale (aka Konungs skuggsjá, the "King's Mirror"), an Old Norwegian philosophical didactic work written in the mid-13th century, the King told his son of several whales that inhabit the Icelandic seas, concluding with a description of a large whale that he himself feared, but he doubted anyone would believe him about without seeing it. He described the hafgufa as a massive fish that looked more like an island than like a living thing. The King noted that hafgufa was rarely seen, but always seen in the same two places. He concluded there must be only two of them and that they must be infertile, otherwise the seas would be full of them.

The King described the feeding manner of hafgufa: The fish would belch, which would expel so much food that it would attract all the nearby fish. Once a large number had crowded into its mouth and belly, it would close its mouth and devour them all at once. (Note: Text vs. translation: Einn fiskr er enn útaldr, er mér vex heldr í augu frá at segja fyrir vaxtar hans sakir, þviat þat mun flestum mǫnnum útrúligt þykkja; þar kunnu ok fæstir frá hánum nǫkkut at segja gǫrla. þviat hann er flestum sjaldsénn, þviat hann er sjaldan við land eða í ván við veiðarmenn, ok ætla ek ekki þesskyns fisk margan i hǫfum; vér kǫllum hann optast á vára tungu hafgufu. Eigi kann ek skilvísliga fráa lengð hans at secja með álna tali, þviat þeim sinnum er hann hefir birzk fyrir mǫnnum, þá hefir hann landi sýnzk likari en fiski; hvárk spyr ek, at hann hafi veiddr verit né dauðr fundinn; ok þat þykki mér likt, at þeir sé eigi fleiri en tveir í hǫfum, ok ǫngvan ætla ek þá auka geta sín ámilli, þiat ek ætla þá hina sǫmu jafnan vera, of eigo mundi ǫðrum fiskum hlýða, at þeir væri svá margir sem aðrir hvalir fyrir mikilleika sakir þeirra, ok svá mikillar atvinnu er þeir þurfu. En sú er náttúra sǫgð þeirra fiska, at þegar er hann skal eta, þá gefr hann ropa mikinn upp or hálsi sér, ok fylgir þeim ropa mikil áta, svá at allskyns fiskar, þeir er í nánd verða staddir, þá samnask til, bæði smáir ok stórir, ok hyggjask sér skulu þar matar afla ok góðrar atvinnu; en þessi hinn mikli fiskr lætr standa munn sinn opinn meðan, ok er þat hlið eigi minna en sund mikit eða fjǫrðr, ok kunni fiskar eigi at varask þat at renna þar í með fjǫlda sinum. En þegar er kviðr hans er fullr ok munnr, þá lýkr hann saman munn sinn, ok hefir þá all veidda ok inni byrgða, er áðr girntusk þangat at leita sér til matfanga — Keyser; Munch; Unger edd., Konungs skuggsjá Translation: There is a fish that is still unmentioned, which it is scarcely advisable to speak about on account of its size, because it will seem to most people incredible. There are only a very few who can speak upon it clearly, because it is seldom near land nor appears where it may be seen by fishermen, and I suppose there are not many of this sort of fish in the sea. Most often in our tongue we call it hafgufa. Nor can I conclusively speak about its length in ells, because the times he has shown before men, he has appeared more like land than like a fish. Neither have I heard that one had been caught or found dead; and it seems to me as though there must be no more than two in the oceans, and I deem that each is unable to reproduce itself, for I believe that they are always the same ones. Then too, neither would it do for other fish if the hafgufa were of such a number as other whales, on account of their vastness, and how much subsistence that they need. It is said to be the nature of these fish that when one shall desire to eat, then it stretches up its neck with a great belching, and following this belching comes forth much food, so that all kinds of fish that are near to hand will come to present location, then will gather together, both small and large, believing they shall obtain there food and good eating; but this great fish lets its mouth stand open the while, and the gap is no less wide than that of a great sound or fjord, And nor may the fish avoid running together there in their great numbers. But as soon as its stomach and mouth is full, then it locks together its jaws and has the fish all caught and enclosed, that before greedily came there looking for food — Translation)

Its mention in the Speculum regale was noted by Olaus Wormiaus (Ole Worm) in his posthumous Museum Wormianum (1654) and by another Dane, Thomas Bartholin the senior (1657). Ole Worm classed it as the 22nd type of Cetus, as did Bartholin, but one difference was that Ole Worm's book printed the entry with the skewed spelling hafgufe.

== Odd's saga ==
In the later version of Örvar-Odds saga dating to the late 14th century, hafgufa is described as the largest sea monster (sjóskrímsl) of all, (Note: Technically the hafgufa and lygbakr are mentioned as two sea monsters, and the hafgufa is called the "biggest monster in the whole ocean".) which fed on whales, ships, men, and anything it could catch, according to the deck officer Vignir Oddsson who knew the lore. He said it lived underwater, but reared its snout ("mouth and nostrils") above water for a duration until the tide changed, and that it was the nostril and lower jaw which they had sailed in-between, although they mistook these for two massive rocks rising from the sea. (Note: Text vs. English translation: Vignir sagði: «..[N]ú mun ek segja þér, at þetta eru sjáskrímsl tvau, heitir annat hafgufa, en annat lyngbakr; er hann mestr allra hvala í heiminum, en hafgufa er mest skrímsl skapat í sjánum; er þat hennar náttúra, at hon gleypir bæði menn ok skip ok hvali ok allt þat hon náir; hon er í kafi, svá at dægrum skiptir, ok þá hon skýtr upp hǫfði sínu ok nǫsum, þá er þat aldri skemmr en sjávarfall, at hon er uppi. Nú var þat leiðarsundit, er vér fórum á millum kjapta hennar, en nasir hennar ok inn neðri kjaptrinn váru klettar þeir, er yðr sýndiz í hafinu, en lyngbakr var ey sjá, er niðr sǫkk. En Ǫgmundr flóki hefir sent þessi kvikvendi í móti þér með fjǫlkynngi sinni til þess at bana þér ok ǫllum mǫnnum þínum; hugði hann, at svá skyldi hafa farit fleiri sem þeir, at nú druknuðu, en hann ætlaði, at hafgufan skyldi hafa gleypt oss alla. Nú siglda ek því í gin hennar, at ek vissa, at hún var nýkomin upp. — Boer, Richard Constant ed., Ǫrvar-Odds saga Translation: Vignir said, "..Now I will tell you that there are two sea-monsters. One is called the hafgufa [sea-mist], another lyngbakr. It [the lyngbakr] is the largest whale in the world, but the hafgufa is the largest monster in the sea. It is the nature of this creature to swallow men and ships, and even whales and everything else within reach. It stays submerged for days, then rears its head and nostrils above surface and stays that way at least until the change of tide. Now, that sound we just sailed through was the space between its jaws, and its nostrils and lower jaw were those rocks that appeared in the sea, while the lyngbakr was the island we saw sinking down. However, Ogmund Tussock has sent these creatures to you by means of his magic to cause the death of you [Odd] and all your men. He thought more men would have gone the same way as those that had already drowned [i.e., to the lyngbakr which wasn't an island, and sank], and he expected that the hafgufa would have swallowed us all. Today I sailed through its mouth because I knew that it had recently surfaced. — Translation)

Örvar-Oddr and his crew, who started from the Greenland Sea were sailing along the coast south and westward, towards a fjord called Skuggi (Note: This was where Vignir knew to find the troll Ögmundr flóki (Ogmund Tussock), slayer of Eyþjófr (Eythjof). They aimed to fight Ögmundr so they could exact vengeance.) on Helluland (also given by the English-translated name of "Slabland"), and it is on the way there that they encountered two monsters, the hafgufa ('sea-reek') and lyngbakr ('heather-back').

== Original sea monster and analogues ==
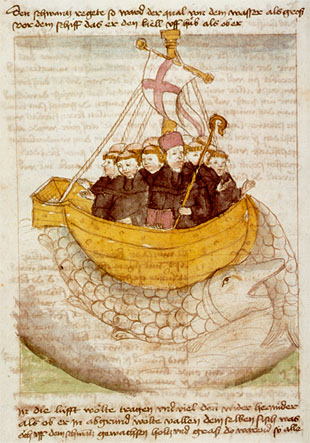
St. Brendan says Mass atop Jasconius

The aspidochelone of the Physiologus is identified as the potential source for the hafgufa lore.

Although the original aspidochelone was a turtle-island of warmer waters, this was reinvented as a type of whale named aspedo in the Icelandic Physiologus (fragment B, No. 8). (Note: A finer point is that the Latin aspidochelone being called cetus only signified it was a "cetacean" in the non-modern, broader sense including sharks, and actually, the classical Greek equivalent κῆτος signified "sea monster" of any kind.) In the Icelandic aspedo was described as a whale (hvalr) being mistaken for an island, and as opening its mouth to issue a perfume of sorts to attract prey. Halldór Hermannsson observed that these were represented as two distinct illustrations in the Icelandic copy; he further theorized that this led to the mistaken notion of separate creatures called hafgufa and lyngbakr in existence, as occurs in the saga.

Contrary to the saga, Danish physician Thomas Bartholin in his Historiarum anatomicarum IV (1657) stated that the hafgufa ('sea vapor') was synonymous with 'lyngbak' ([sic.], 'back like Erica plants'). (Note: The common heather was actually the type species of Linnaeus's Erica genus, and it was not until 1802 the common heather was reclassified Calluna vulgaris.) He added that it was on the back of this beast that St. Brendan read his Mass, causing the island to sink after their departure. The Icelander Jón Guðmundsson (d. 1658)'s Natural History of Iceland (Note: The actual title is Stutt undirrétting um Íslands aðskiljanlegar náttúrur ("A brief description of Iceland's various natures").) also equated the lyngbakr and hafgufa with the beast mistaken for an island in St. Brendan's voyage. The island-like creature is indeed told of in the legend of Brendan's voyage, though the giant fish is named Jasconius/Jaskonius.

Hans Egede writing on the kracken (kraken) of Norway equates it with the Icelandic hafgufa, though has heard little on the latter. and later, the non-native Moravian cleric David Crantz's History of Greenland (1765, in German) treated hafgafa as synonymous with the krake[n] in the Norwegian tongue. However, Finnur Jónsson for instance has expressed skepticism towards the notion which developed that the krake had its origins in the hafgufa.

In 2023, scientists reported observed behaviour of whales resembling that of the Hafgufa of legends, by staying stationary on the sea surface with their jaws open and waiting for fish to swim into mouths. The whale may also use chewed up fish to attract more fish. The scientists noted that the earliest description of Hafgufa described it as a type of whale, and proposed that this behaviour of whale as the origin of the Hafgufa myth which became more fantastic in later centuries.

== In popular culture ==
In the 2022 video game God of War Ragnarök, Hafgufas are portrayed as giant flying jellyfish that inhabit the skies of the deserts in Alfheim and are able to control sandstorms with their whale-like singing.
