= Fastitocalon (poem) =

Poem by J. R. R. Tolkien

"Fastitocalon" is a medieval-style poem by J. R. R. Tolkien about a gigantic sea turtle. The setting is explicitly Middle-earth. The poem is included in The Adventures of Tom Bombadil.

The work takes its name from a medieval poem of a similar name, itself based on the second-century Latin Physiologus.

== Origins ==
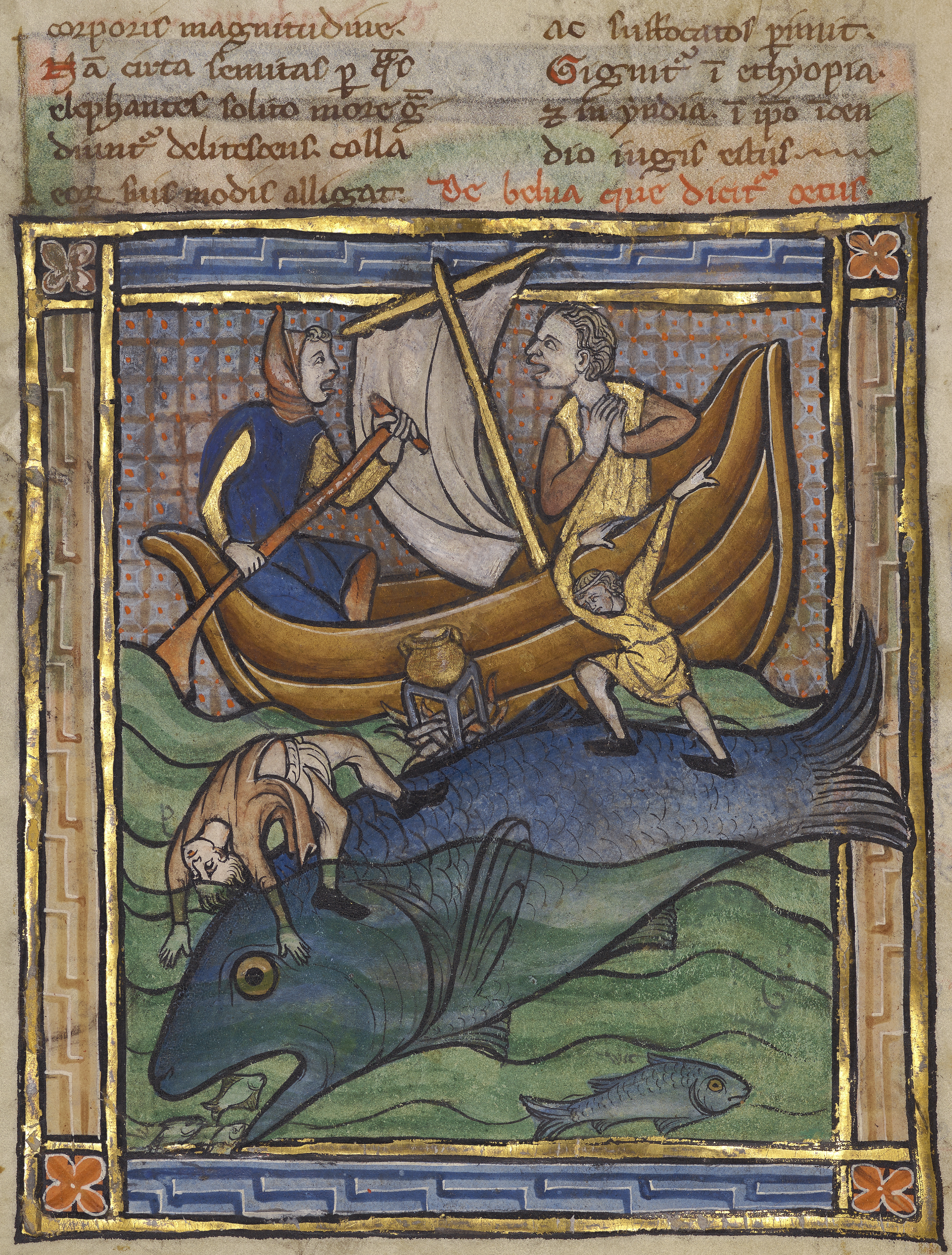
The original Fastitocalon was a sea-monster that lured sailors to rest on its back, and then drowned them. French manuscript, c. 1270

The second-century Latin Physiologus tells of a sea-monster, the Aspidochelone. This is retold in the Old English poem "The Whale", where the monster appears under the name Fastitocalon, in the Exeter Book, folio 96b-97b.

By etymology, the name "Fastitocalon" is a corruption of the Greek Aspido-chelōne, "round-shielded turtle", with the addition of the letter F, according to Tolkien, "simply to make the name alliterate, as was compulsory for poets in his day, with the other words in his line. Shocking, or charming freedom, according to taste". Tolkien commented that the tale of the monster that treacherously simulates an island is from "the East", and that the turtle is mixed up with a whale when the story arrives in Europe, so that the Old English version has him feeding like a whale "trawling with an open mouth".

== Publication history ==
First verse

Look, there is Fastitocalon!
An island good to land upon,
Although 'tis rather bare.
Come, leave the sea! And let us run,
Or dance, or lie down in the sun!
See, gulls are sitting there!
Beware!
Gulls do not sink.
There they may sit, or strut and prink:
Their part is to tip the wink,
If anyone should dare
Upon that isle to settle,
Or only for a while to get
Relief from sickness or the wet,
Or maybe boil a kettle.

Tolkien's first Fastitocalon poem was published in the Stapledon Magazine in 1927. A second, heavily revised version appeared in The Adventures of Tom Bombadil in 1962.

== Poem ==
Fastitocalon, the central character in the poem, is the last of the mighty turtle-fish. This poem is well known to the Hobbits. It tells of how Fastitocalon's huge size, a "whale-island", enticed sailors to land on its back. After the sailors lit a fire upon Fastitocalon, it dived underwater, causing the sailors to drown.

Fastitocalon was at the surface for long enough for vegetation to grow on its back, adding to the illusion that it was an actual island. Fastitocalon was far larger than the largest non-fictional turtle (Archelon).

It is never explained whether the turtle-fish were an actual race in Middle-earth or fictional characters created solely for the poem. It is distinctly possible that the story is in fact an allegory of the fall of Númenor. Like the Fastitocalon, Númenor too sank below the waves, and drowned most of its inhabitants.

== Analysis ==
Norma Roche writes in Mythlore that Tolkien makes use of the medieval story of the voyages of Saint Brendan and the Irish Immram tradition, where a hero sails to the Celtic Otherworld, for his vision of the Blessed Realm and seas to the west of Middle-earth. This is seen in poems such as "The Sea-Bell" and "Imram", while (as several scholars note) his "Fastitocalon" resembles the tale of Jasconius the whale.

John D. Rateliff notes that Tolkien stated that when he read a medieval work, he wanted to write a modern one in the same tradition. He constantly created these, whether pastiches and parodies like "Fastitocalon"; adaptations in medieval metres, like "The Lay of Aotrou and Itroun" or "asterisk texts" like his "The Man in the Moon Stayed Up Too Late" (from "Hey Diddle Diddle"); and finally "new wine in old bottles" such as "The Nameless Land" and Aelfwine's Annals. The works are extremely varied, but all are "suffused with medieval borrowings", making them, writes Rateliff, "most readers' portal into medieval literature". Not all found use in Middle-earth, but they all helped Tolkien develop a medieval-style craft that enabled him to create the attractively authentic Middle-earth legendarium.

The scholar of literature Paul H. Kocher comments that from a land-loving Hobbit point of view, the story warns never to go out on the dangerous sea, let alone try to land on an uncharted island. He groups the poem with "Oliphaunt", which the Hobbit Sam Gamgee recites in Ithilien, and "Cat", where the innocent-looking pet dreams of slaughter and violence, as reworked Bestiary poems.

== Sources ==
- Carpenter, Humphrey, ed. (2023) [1981]. The Letters of J. R. R. Tolkien: Revised and Expanded Edition. New York: Harper Collins. ISBN 978-0-35-865298-4.
- Shippey, Tom (2005) [1982]. The Road to Middle-Earth: How J. R. R. Tolkien Created a New Mythology (Third ed.). HarperCollins. ISBN 978-0-261-10275-0.
