= Lyngbakr =

Mythological sea monster

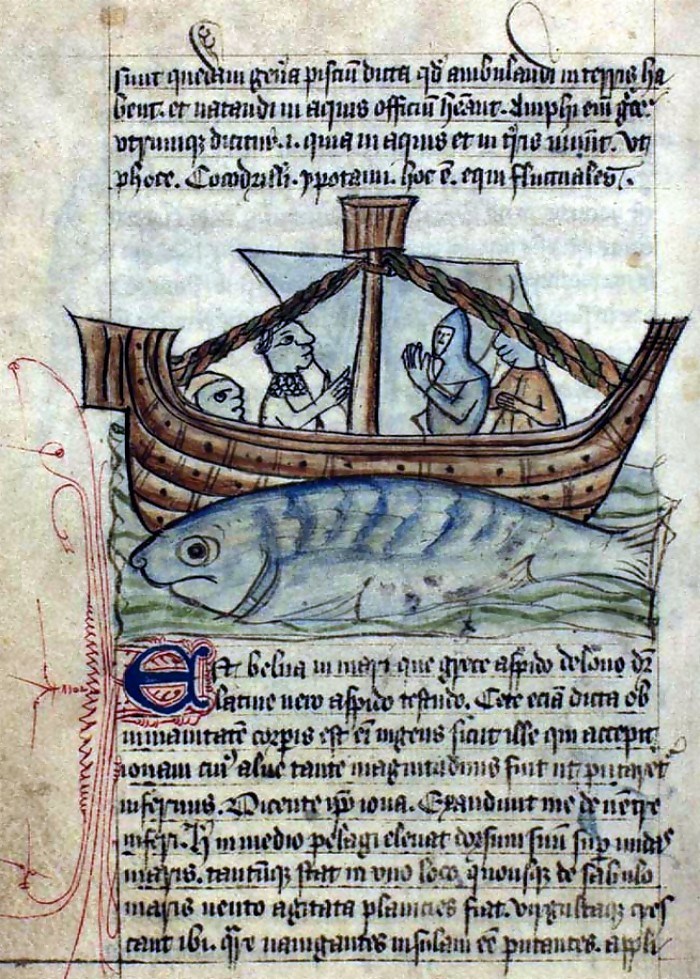
- The lyngbakr may have been borrowed from the aspidochelone (shown above).
- Grouping: Legendary creature
- Sub grouping: Whale-like sea monster
- Folklore: Sagas of Iceland
- Country: Greenland
- Habitat: Greenland Sea

Lyngbakr (Icelandic, lyngi "heather" + bak "back") is the name of a massive whale-like sea monster reported in the Örvar-Odds saga to have existed in the Greenland Sea. According to the saga, Lyngbakr would bait seafarers by posing as a heather-covered island, and when a crew landed on his back, he sank into the sea, drowning the crew.

== Örvar-Odds saga ==
As Örvar-Oddr and his crew were sailing southwesterly through the Greenland Sea in vengeance against the troll Ögmundr Floki, slayer of Eythjof, the deck officer Vignir knew this area would be dangerous, and made Oddr agree to sail the ship beginning the next day, to which Oddr requested Vignir advise him. As they sailed, they spotted two rocks which rose out of the water. The presence of these rocks puzzled Oddr. Later, they passed by a large island covered in heather. Curious, Oddr made up his mind to turn back and send five men to check out the island, but as they approached where the island had been before, they saw that it and the two rocks vanished.

Vignir explained to Oddr that, had they landed sooner, the crew would have surely drowned. The "rocks" and "island" must have been two sea monsters—Lyngbakr, the greatest whale in the world, and hafgufa, who bore all the monsters in the sea. The rocks had surely been the nose of Hafgufa; the island, Lyngbakr; and Ögmundr had surely summoned the beasts to kill Oddr and his men.

Both the lyngbakur and hafgufa seem to have derived from a single creature called the aspidochelone in the Physiologus. The Icelandic Physiologus contains two illustrations of the aspidochelone, one with its back overgrown with vegetation and another with gaping jaws.

== See also ==
- Aspidochelone
- Gunnbjörn's skerries
- Kraken
