= Flat Earth =

Archaic conception of Earth's shape

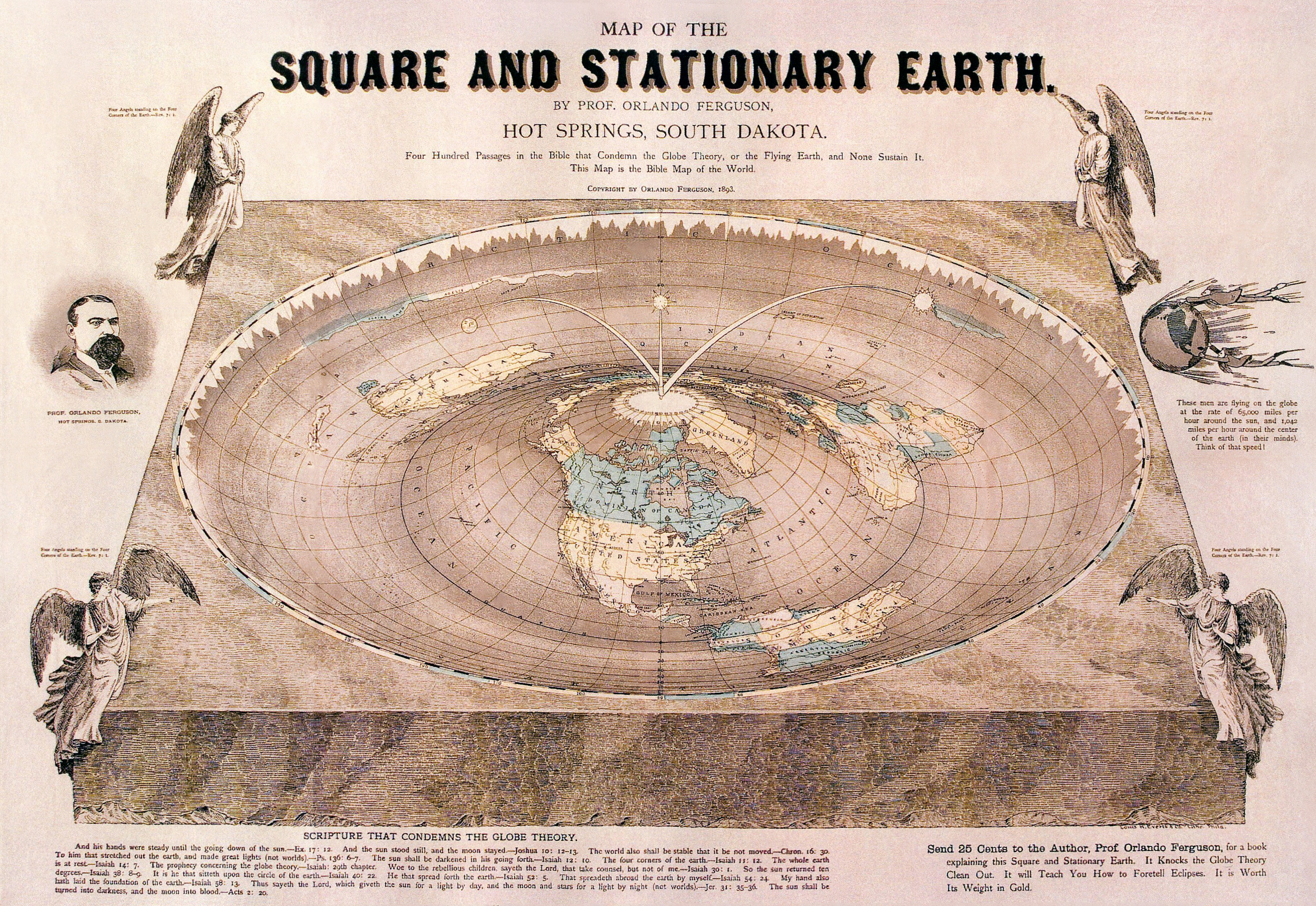
Flat Earth map drawn by Orlando Ferguson in 1893. The map contains several references to biblical passages as well as various supposed refutations of the "Globe Theory".

Flat Earth is an archaic and scientifically disproven conception of Earth's shape as a plane or disk. Many ancient societies subscribed to a flat-Earth cosmography. The model has undergone a recent resurgence as a conspiracy theory in the 21st century.

The idea of a spherical Earth appeared in ancient Greek philosophy with Pythagoras (6th century BC). However, the early Greek cosmological view of a flat Earth persisted among most pre-Socratics (6th–5th century BC). In the early 4th century BC, Plato wrote about a spherical Earth. By about 330 BC, his former student Aristotle had provided strong empirical evidence for a spherical Earth. Knowledge of Earth's global shape gradually began to spread beyond the Hellenistic world. By the early period of the Christian Church, the spherical view was widely held, with some notable exceptions. In contrast, ancient Chinese scholars consistently describe Earth as flat, and this perception remained unchanged until their encounters with Jesuit missionaries in the 17th century. Muslim scholars in early Islam maintained that Earth is flat. However, since the 9th century, Muslim scholars have tended to believe in a spherical Earth.

It is a historical myth that medieval Europeans generally thought Earth was flat. This myth was created in the 17th century by Protestants to argue against Catholic teachings, and gained currency in the 19th century.

Despite the scientific facts and obvious effects of Earth's sphericity, pseudoscientific flat-Earth conspiracy theories persist. Since the 2010s, belief in a flat Earth has increased, both as membership of modern flat Earth societies, and as unaffiliated individuals using social media. In a 2018 study reported on by Scientific American, only 82% of 18- to 24-year-old American respondents agreed with the statement "I have always believed the world is round". However, a firm belief in a flat Earth is rare, with less than 2% acceptance in all age groups.

== History ==
=== Belief in flat Earth ===
==== Near East ====
In early Egyptian and Mesopotamian thought, the world was portrayed as a disk floating in the ocean. A similar model is found in the Homeric account from the 8th century BC in which "Okeanos, the personified body of water surrounding the circular surface of the Earth, is the begetter of all life and possibly of all gods."

The Pyramid Texts and Coffin Texts of ancient Egypt show a similar cosmography; Nun (the Ocean) encircled nbwt ("dry lands" or "islands").

The Israelites also imagined the Earth to be a disc floating on water with an arched firmament above it that separated the Earth from the heavens. The sky was a solid dome with the Sun, Moon, planets, and stars embedded in it.

==== Greece ====
===== Poets =====
Both Homer and Hesiod described a disc cosmography on the Shield of Achilles. This poetic tradition of an Earth-encircling (gaiaokhos) sea (Oceanus) and a disc also appears in Stasinus of Cyprus, Mimnermus, Aeschylus, and Apollonius Rhodius.

Homer's description of the disc cosmography on the shield of Achilles with the encircling ocean is repeated far later in Quintus Smyrnaeus' Posthomerica (4th century AD), which continues the narration of the Trojan War.

===== Philosophers =====
Possible rendering of Anaximander's world map

Several pre-Socratic philosophers believed that the world was flat: Thales (c. 550 BC) according to several sources, and Leucippus (c. 440 BC) and Democritus (c. 460–370 BC) according to Aristotle.

Thales thought that the Earth floated in water like a log. It has been argued, however, that Thales actually believed in a spherical Earth. Anaximander (c. 550 BC) believed that the Earth was a short cylinder with a flat, circular top that remained stable because it was the same distance from all things. Anaximenes of Miletus believed that "the Earth is flat and rides on air; in the same way the Sun and the Moon and the other heavenly bodies, which are all fiery, ride the air because of their flatness". Xenophanes (c. 500 BC) thought that the Earth was flat, with its upper side touching the air, and the lower side extending without limit.

Belief in a flat Earth continued into the 5th century BC. Anaxagoras (c. 450 BC) agreed that the Earth was flat, and his pupil Archelaus believed that the flat Earth was depressed in the middle like a saucer, to allow for the fact that the Sun does not rise and set at the same time for everyone.

===== Historians =====
Hecataeus of Miletus believed that the Earth was flat and surrounded by water. Herodotus in his Histories ridiculed the belief that water encircled the world, yet most classicists agree that he still believed Earth was flat because of his descriptions of literal "ends" or "edges" of the Earth.

==== Northern Europe ====
The ancient Norse and Germanic peoples believed in a flat-Earth cosmography with the Earth surrounded by an ocean, with the axis mundi, a world tree (Yggdrasil), or pillar (Irminsul) in the centre. In the world-encircling ocean sat a snake called Jormungandr. The Norse creation account preserved in Gylfaginning (VIII) states that during the creation of the Earth, an impassable sea was placed around it:

And Jafnhárr said: "Of the blood, which ran and welled forth freely out of his wounds, they made the sea, when they had formed and made firm the Earth together, and laid the sea in a ring round. about her; and it may well seem a hard thing to most men to cross over it."

The late Norse Konungs skuggsjá, on the other hand, explains Earth's shape as a sphere:

If you take a lighted candle and set it in a room, you may expect it to light up the entire interior, unless something should hinder, though the room be quite large. But if you take an apple and hang it close to the flame, so near that it is heated, the apple will darken nearly half the room or even more. However, if you hang the apple near the wall, it will not get hot; the candle will light up the whole house; and the shadow on the wall where the apple hangs will be scarcely half as large as the apple itself. From this you may infer that the Earth-circle is round like a ball and not equally near the sun at every point. But where the curved surface lies nearest the sun's path, there will the greatest heat be; and some of the lands that lie continuously under the unbroken rays cannot be inhabited.

==== East Asia ====
In ancient China, the prevailing belief was that the Earth was flat and square, while the heavens were round, an assumption virtually unquestioned until the introduction of European astronomy in the 17th century. The English sinologist Cullen emphasizes the point that there was no concept of a round Earth in ancient Chinese astronomy:

Chinese thought on the form of the Earth remained almost unchanged from early times until the first contacts with modern science through the medium of Jesuit missionaries in the seventeenth century. While the heavens were variously described as being like an umbrella covering the Earth (the Kai Tian theory), or like a sphere surrounding it (the Hun Tian theory), or as being without substance while the heavenly bodies float freely (the Hsüan yeh theory), the Earth was at all times flat, although perhaps bulging up slightly.

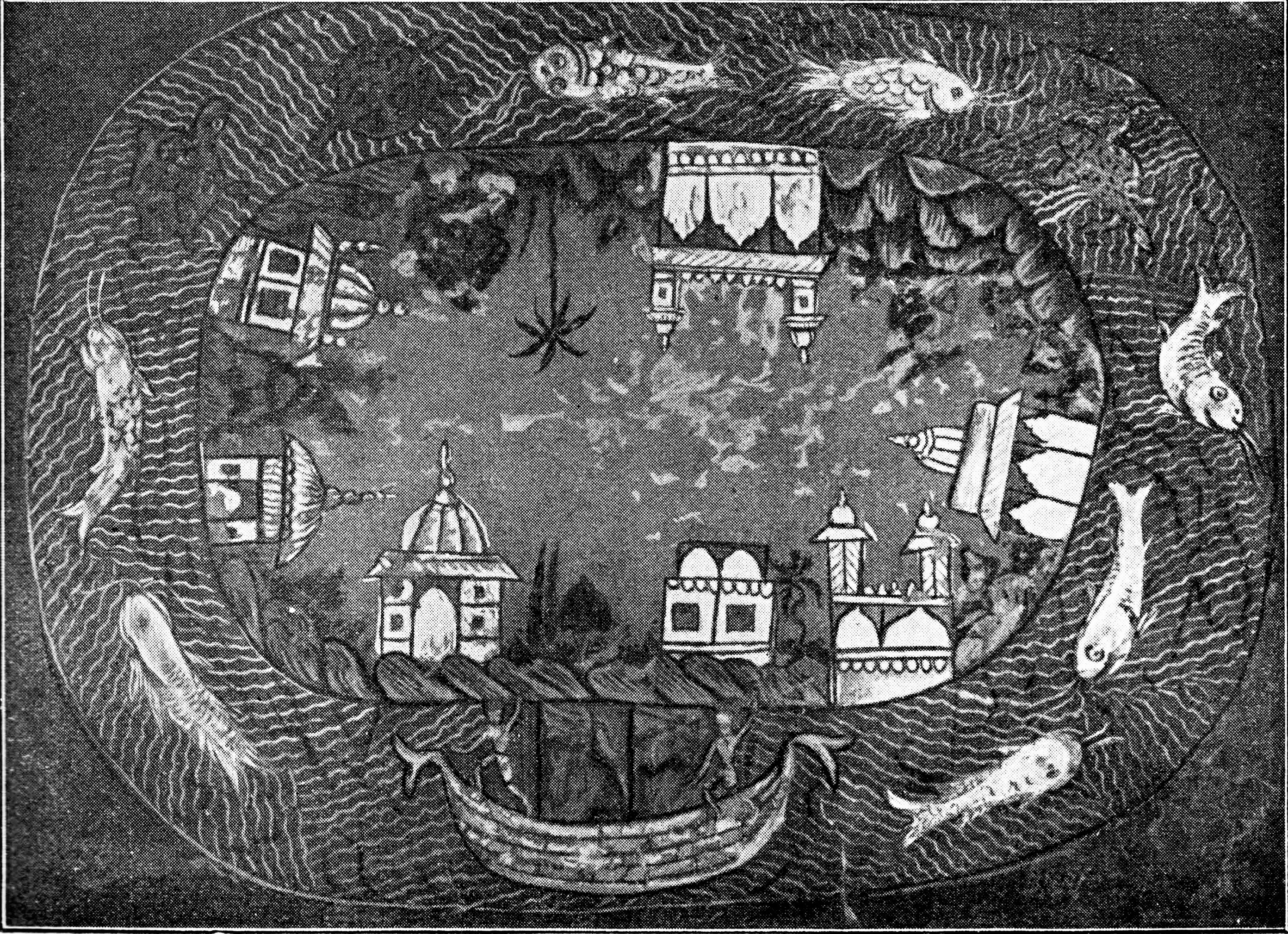
Illustration based on that of a 12th-century Asian cosmographer

The model of an egg was often used by Chinese astronomers such as Zhang Heng (78–139 AD) to describe the heavens as spherical:

The heavens are like a hen's egg and as round as a crossbow bullet; the Earth is like the yolk of the egg, and lies in the centre.

This analogy with a curved egg led some modern historians, notably Joseph Needham, to conjecture that Chinese astronomers were, after all, aware of the Earth's sphericity. The egg reference, however, was rather meant to clarify the relative position of the flat Earth to the heavens:

In a passage of Zhang Heng's cosmogony not translated by Needham, Zhang himself says: "Heaven takes its body from the Yang, so it is round and in motion. Earth takes its body from the Yin, so it is flat and quiescent". The point of the egg analogy is simply to stress that the Earth is completely enclosed by Heaven, rather than merely covered from above as the Kai Tian describes. Chinese astronomers, many of them brilliant men by any standards, continued to think in flat-Earth terms until the seventeenth century; this surprising fact might be the starting-point for a re-examination of the apparent facility with which the idea of a spherical Earth found acceptance in fifth-century BC Greece.

Further examples cited by Needham supposed to demonstrate dissenting voices from the ancient Chinese consensus actually refer without exception to the Earth being square, not to it being flat. Accordingly, the 13th-century scholar Li Ye, who argued that the movements of the round heaven would be hindered by a square Earth, did not advocate a spherical Earth, but rather that its edge should be rounded off so as to be circular. However, Needham disagrees, affirming that Li Ye believed the Earth to be spherical, similar in shape to the heavens but much smaller. This was preconceived by the 4th-century scholar Yu Xi, who argued for the infinity of outer space surrounding the Earth and that the latter could be either square or round, in accordance to the shape of the heavens. When Chinese geographers of the 17th century, influenced by European cartography and astronomy, showed the Earth as a sphere that could be circumnavigated by sailing around the globe, they did so with formulaic terminology previously used by Zhang Heng to describe the spherical shape of the Sun and Moon (i.e. that they were as round as a crossbow bullet).

As noted in the book Huainanzi, in the 2nd century BC, Chinese astronomers effectively inverted Eratosthenes' calculation of the curvature of the Earth to calculate the height of the Sun above the Earth. By assuming the Earth was flat, they arrived at a distance of 100000 li (approximately 200000 km). The Zhoubi Suanjing also discusses how to determine the distance of the Sun by measuring the length of noontime shadows at different latitudes, a method similar to Eratosthenes' measurement of the circumference of the Earth, but the Zhoubi Suanjing assumes that the Earth is flat.

=== Alternate or mixed theories ===
==== Mesopotamia ====
Although Mesopotamian cosmology is usually depicted as a flat disc of land floating in water, some texts describe a complex structure composed of vertical layers. For instance, KAR 307, a cuneiform text, depicts three layered earths. The "Upper Earth" is the land inhabited by mankind, the "Middle Earth" are subterranean Apsu waters ruled by Enki, and the "Lower Earth" is the underworld which has 600 Anunnaki. While none of the ancient Mesopotamian models were spherical, Professor Wayne Horowitz documents "significant variety" in different Mesopotamian cosmological texts, noting "disagreement between texts from different periods, of different genres, and even among texts from the same period and genre."

==== Greece: spherical Earth ====
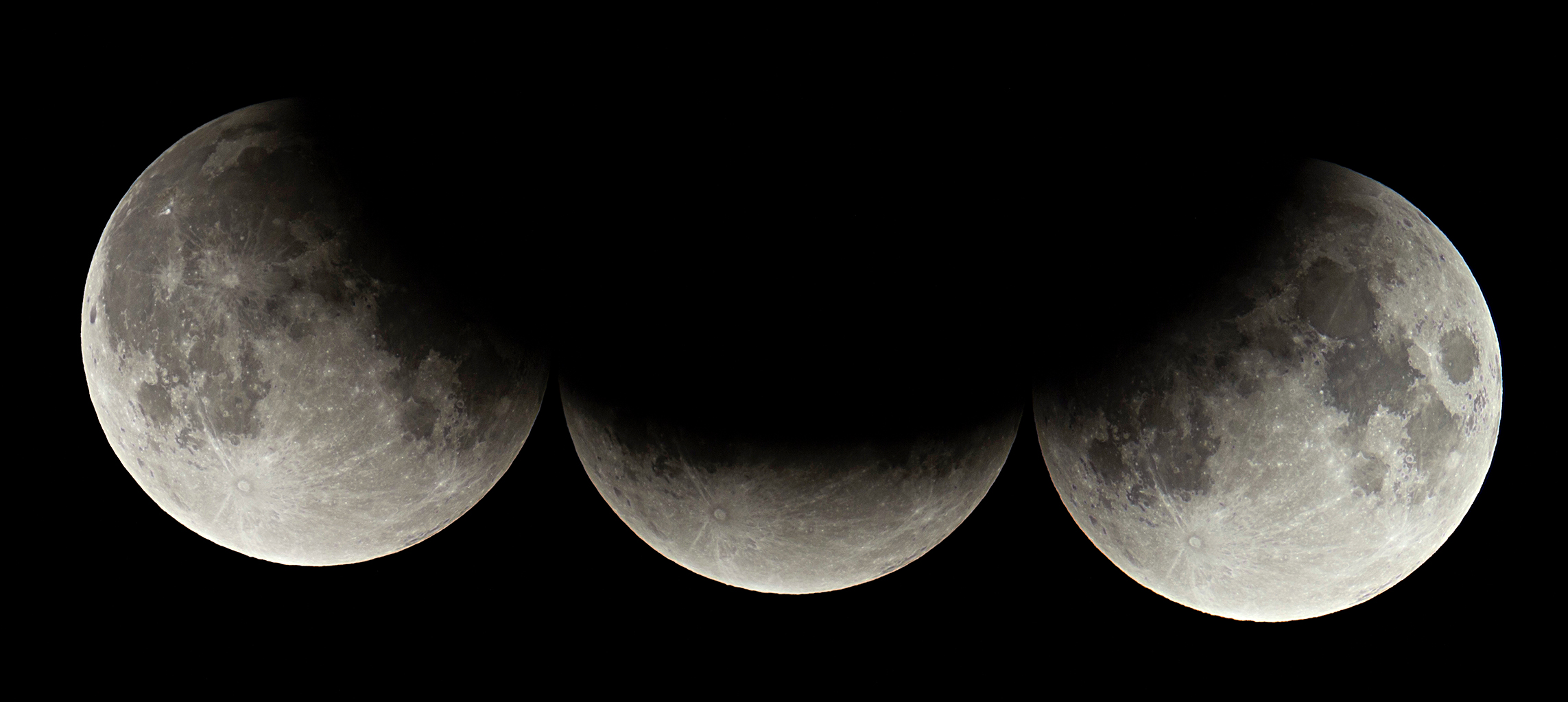
Semi-circular shadow of Earth on the Moon during a partial lunar eclipse

Pythagoras in the 6th century BC and Parmenides in the 5th century BC stated that the Earth is spherical, and this view spread rapidly in the Greek world. Around 330 BC, Aristotle maintained on the basis of physical theory and observational evidence that the Earth was spherical, and reported an estimate of its circumference. The Earth's circumference was first determined around 240 BC by Eratosthenes. By the 2nd century AD, Ptolemy had derived his maps from a globe and developed the system of latitude, longitude, and climes. His Almagest was written in Greek and only translated into Latin in the 11th century from Arabic translations.

Lucretius (1st century BC) opposed the concept of a spherical Earth, because he considered that an infinite universe had no center towards which heavy bodies would tend. Thus, he thought the idea of animals walking around topsy-turvy under the Earth was absurd. By the 1st century AD, Pliny the Elder was in a position to say that everyone agreed on the spherical shape of Earth, though disputes continued regarding the nature of the antipodes, and how it is possible to keep the ocean in a curved shape.

==== South Asia ====
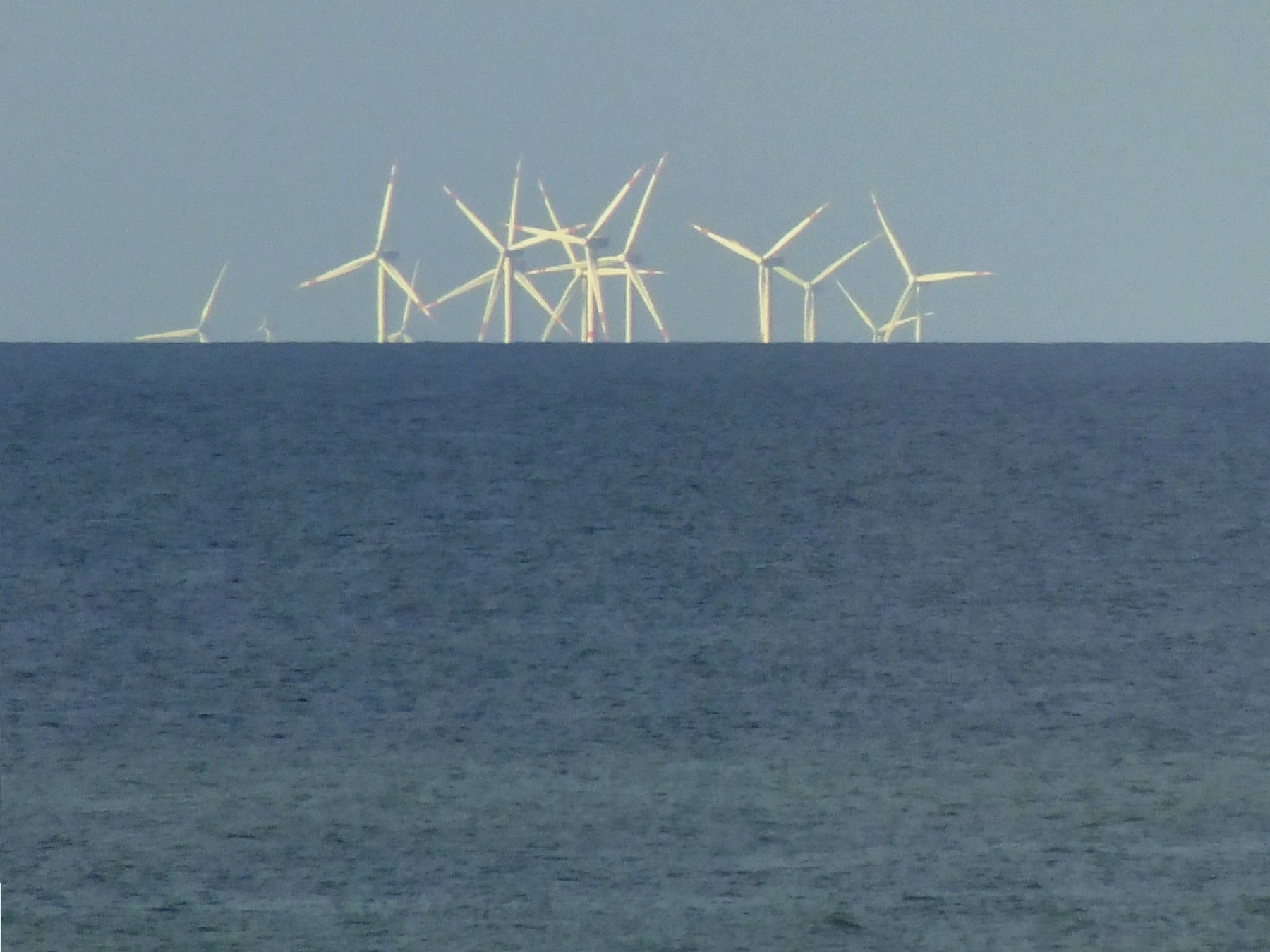
An image of Thorntonbank Wind Farm (near the Belgian coast) with the lower parts of the more distant towers increasingly hidden by the horizon, demonstrating the curvature of the Earth

The Vedic texts depict the cosmos in many ways. One of the earliest Indian cosmological texts pictures the Earth as one of a stack of flat disks.

In the Vedic texts, Dyaus (heaven) and Prithvi (Earth) are compared to wheels on an axle, yielding a flat model. They are also described as bowls or leather bags, yielding a concave model.

By about the 5th century AD, the siddhanta astronomy texts of South Asia, particularly of Aryabhata, assume a spherical Earth as they develop mathematical methods for quantitative astronomy for calendar and time keeping.

The medieval Indian texts called the Puranas describe the Earth as a flat-bottomed, circular disk with concentric oceans and continents. This general scheme is present not only in the Hindu cosmologies, but also in Buddhist and Jain cosmologies of South Asia. However, some Puranas include other models. For example, the fifth canto of the Bhagavata Purana, composed between 500 CE - 1000 CE, includes sections that describe the Earth both as flat and spherical.

==== Early Christian Church ====
During the early period of the Christian Church, the spherical view continued to be widely held, with some notable exceptions.

Until the mid-fourth century AD, virtually all Christian authors held that the Earth was round. Athenagoras, an eastern Christian writing around the year 175 AD, said that the Earth was spherical. Methodius (c. 290 AD), an eastern Christian writing against "the theory of the Chaldeans and the Egyptians" said: "Let us first lay bare ... the theory of the Chaldeans and the Egyptians. They say that the circumference of the universe is likened to the turnings of a well-rounded globe, the Earth being a central point. They say that since its outline is spherical, ... the Earth should be the center of the universe, around which the heaven is whirling." Arnobius, another eastern Christian writing sometime around 305 AD, described the round Earth: "In the first place, indeed, the world itself is neither right nor left. It has neither upper nor lower regions, nor front nor back. For whatever is round and bounded on every side by the circumference of a solid sphere, has no beginning or end ..." Other advocates of a round Earth included Eusebius, Hilary of Poitiers, Irenaeus, Hippolytus of Rome, Firmicus Maternus, Ambrose, Jerome, Prudentius, Favonius Eulogius, and others.

The only exceptions to this consensus up until the mid-fourth century were Theophilus of Antioch and Lactantius, both of whom held anti-Hellenistic views and associated the round-Earth view with pagan cosmology. Lactantius, a western Christian writer and advisor to the first Christian Roman Emperor, Constantine, writing sometime between 304 and 313 AD, ridiculed the notion of antipodes and the philosophers who fancied that "the universe is round like a ball. They also thought that heaven revolves in accordance with the motion of the heavenly bodies. ... For that reason, they constructed brass globes, as though after the figure of the universe."

The influential theologian and philosopher Saint Augustine, one of the four Great Church Fathers of the Western Church, similarly objected to the "fable" of antipodes:

But as to the fable that there are Antipodes, that is to say, men on the opposite side of the Earth, where the sun rises when it sets to us, men who walk with their feet opposite ours that is on no ground credible. And, indeed, it is not affirmed that this has been learned by historical knowledge, but by scientific conjecture, on the ground that the Earth is suspended within the concavity of the sky, and that it has as much room on the one side of it as on the other: hence they say that the part that is beneath must also be inhabited. But they do not remark that, although it be supposed or scientifically demonstrated that the world is of a round and spherical form, yet it does not follow that the other side of the Earth is bare of water; nor even, though it be bare, does it immediately follow that it is peopled. For Scripture, which proves the truth of its historical statements by the accomplishment of its prophecies, gives no false information; and it is too absurd to say, that some men might have taken ship and traversed the whole wide ocean, and crossed from this side of the world to the other, and that thus even the inhabitants of that distant region are descended from that one first man.

Some historians do not view Augustine's scriptural commentaries as endorsing any particular cosmological model, endorsing instead the view that Augustine shared the common view of his contemporaries that the Earth is spherical, in line with his endorsement of science in De Genesi ad litteram. C. P. E. Nothaft, responding to writers like Leo Ferrari who described Augustine as endorsing a flat Earth, says that "...other recent writers on the subject treat Augustine's acceptance of the Earth's spherical shape as a well-established fact".

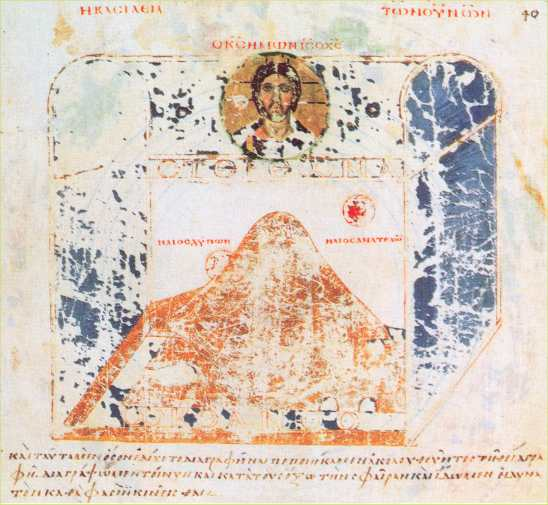
Cosmas Indicopleustes' world view – flat Earth in a Tabernacle

While it always remained a minority view, from the mid-fourth to the seventh centuries AD, the flat-Earth view experienced a revival, around the time when Diodorus of Tarsus founded the exegetical school known as the School of Antioch, which sought to counter what he saw as the pagan cosmology of the Greeks with a return to the traditional cosmology. The writings of Diodorus did not survive, but are reconstructed from later criticism. This revival primarily took place in the East Syriac world (with little influence on the Latin West) where it gained proponents such as Ephrem the Syrian and in the popular hexaemeral homilies of Jacob of Serugh. Chrysostom, one of the four Great Church Fathers of the Eastern Church and Archbishop of Constantinople, explicitly espoused the idea, based on scripture, that the Earth floats miraculously on the water beneath the firmament.

Christian Topography (547) by the Alexandrian monk Cosmas Indicopleustes, who had traveled as far as Sri Lanka and the source of the Blue Nile, is now widely considered the most valuable geographical document of the early medieval age, although it received relatively little attention from contemporaries. In it, the author repeatedly expounds the doctrine that the universe consists of only two places, the Earth below the firmament and heaven above it. Carefully drawing on arguments from scripture, he describes the Earth as a rectangle, 400 days' journey long by 200 wide, surrounded by four oceans and enclosed by four massive walls which support the firmament. The spherical Earth theory is contemptuously dismissed as "pagan".

Severian, Bishop of Gabala (d. 408), wrote that the Earth is flat and the Sun does not pass under it in the night, but "travels through the northern parts as if hidden by a wall". Basil of Caesarea (329–379) argued that the matter was theologically irrelevant.

==== Europe: Early Middle Ages ====
Early medieval Christian writers felt little urge to assume flatness of the Earth, though they had fuzzy impressions of the writings of Ptolemy and Aristotle, relying more on Pliny.

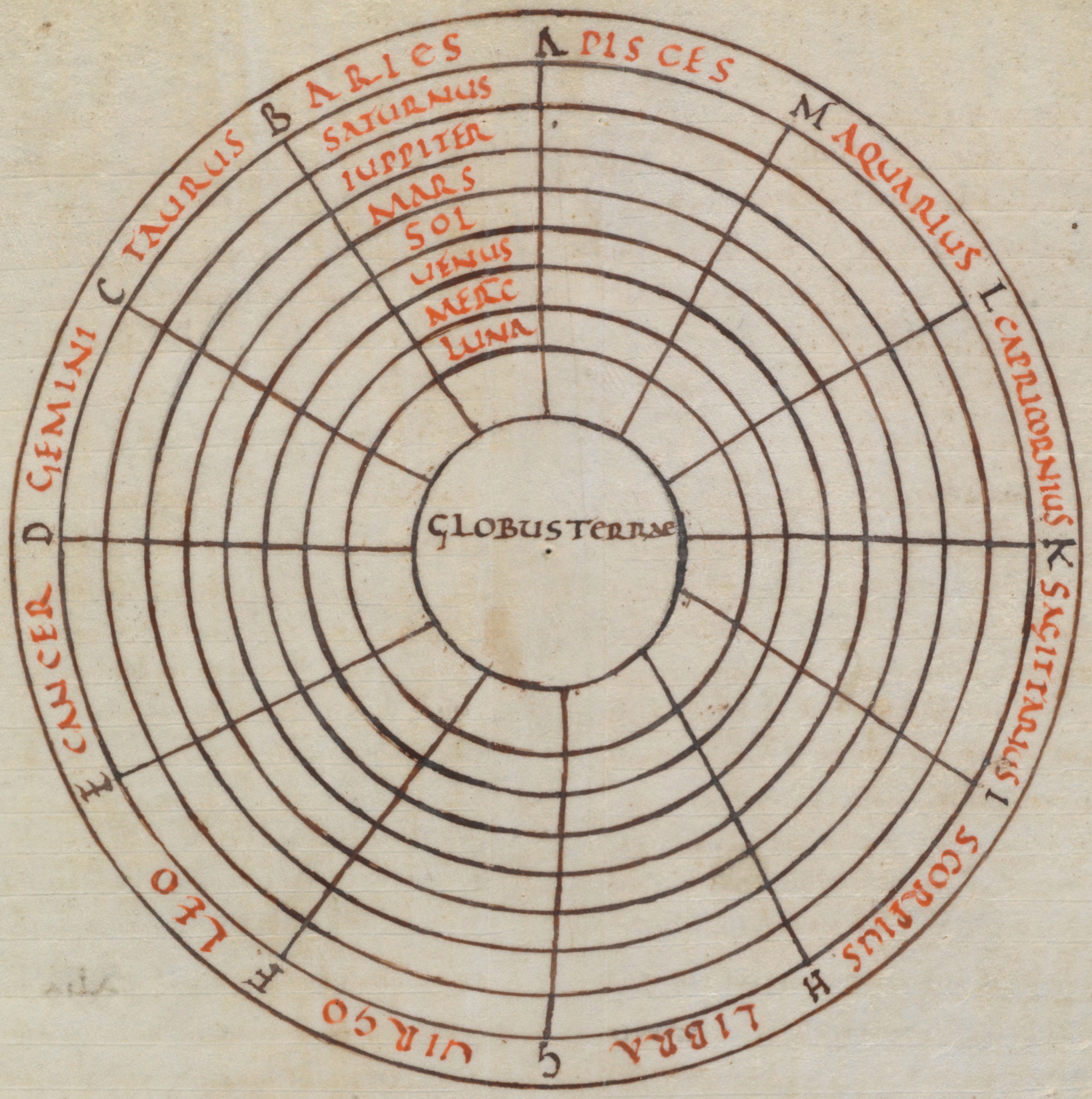
9th-century Macrobian cosmic diagram showing the sphere of the Earth at the center (globus terrae)

With the end of the Western Roman Empire, Western Europe entered the Middle Ages with great difficulties that affected the continent's intellectual production. Most scientific treatises of classical antiquity (in Greek) were unavailable, leaving only simplified summaries and compilations. In contrast, the Eastern Roman Empire did not fall, and it preserved the learning. Still, many textbooks of the Early Middle Ages supported the sphericity of the Earth in the western part of Europe.

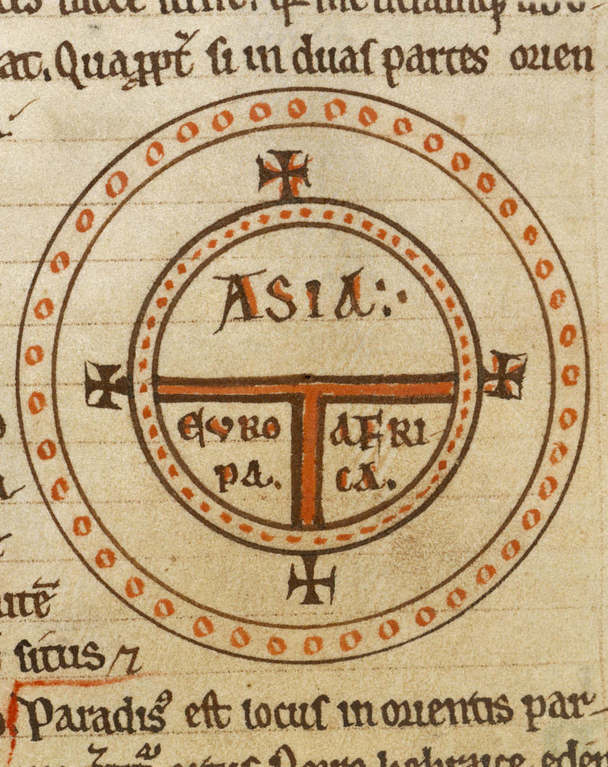
12th-century T and O map representing the inhabited world as described by Isidore of Seville in his Etymologiae (chapter 14, de terra et partibus)

Europe's view of the shape of the Earth in Late Antiquity and the Early Middle Ages may be best expressed by the writings of early Christian scholars:

Bishop Isidore of Seville (560–636) taught in his widely read encyclopedia, the Etymologies, diverse views such as that the Earth "resembles a wheel" resembling Anaximander in language and the map that he provided. This was widely interpreted as referring to a disc-shaped Earth. An illustration from Isidore's De Natura Rerum shows the five zones of the Earth as adjacent circles. Some have concluded that he thought the Arctic and Antarctic zones were adjacent to each other. He did not admit the possibility of antipodes, which he took to mean people dwelling on the opposite side of the Earth, considering them legendary and noting that there was no evidence for their existence. Isidore's T and O map, which was seen as representing a small part of a spherical Earth, continued to be used by authors through the Middle Ages. At the same time, Isidore's works also gave the views of sphericity, for example, in chapter 28 of De Natura Rerum, Isidore claims that the Sun orbits the Earth and illuminates the other side when it is night on this side. In his other work Etymologies, there are also affirmations that the sphere of the sky has Earth in its center and the sky being equally distant on all sides. Other researchers have argued these points as well. "The work remained unsurpassed until the thirteenth century and was regarded as the summit of all knowledge. It became an essential part of European medieval culture. Soon after the invention of typography it appeared many times in print." However, "The Scholastics – later medieval philosophers, theologians, and scientists – were helped by the Arabic translators and commentaries, but they hardly needed to struggle against a flat-Earth legacy from the early middle ages (500–1050). Early medieval writers often had fuzzy and imprecise impressions of both Ptolemy and Aristotle and relied more on Pliny, but they felt (with one exception), little urge to assume flatness."

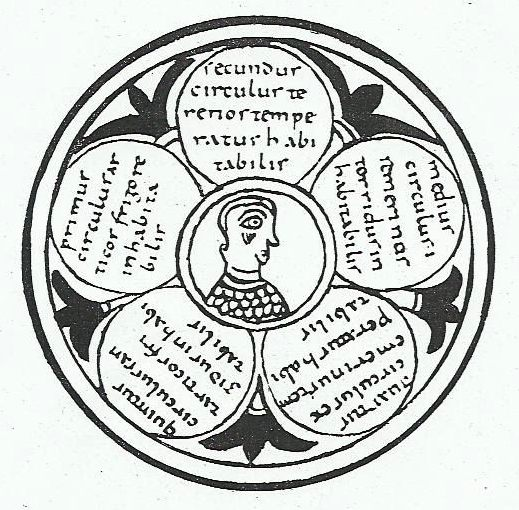
Isidore's portrayal of the five zones of the Earth

St Vergilius of Salzburg (c. 700–784), in the middle of the 8th century, discussed or taught some geographical or cosmographical ideas that St Boniface found sufficiently objectionable that he complained about them to Pope Zachary. The only surviving record of the incident is contained in Zachary's reply, dated 748, where he wrote:

As for the perverse and sinful doctrine which he (Virgil) against God and his own soul has uttered – if it shall be clearly established that he professes belief in another world and other men existing beneath the Earth, or in (another) sun and moon there, thou art to hold a council, deprive him of his sacerdotal rank, and expel him from the Church.

Some authorities have suggested that the sphericity of the Earth was among the aspects of Vergilius's teachings that Boniface and Zachary considered objectionable. Others have considered this unlikely, and take the wording of Zachary's response to indicate at most an objection to belief in the existence of humans living in the antipodes. In any case, there is no record of any further action having been taken against Vergilius. He was later appointed bishop of Salzburg and was canonised in the 13th century.

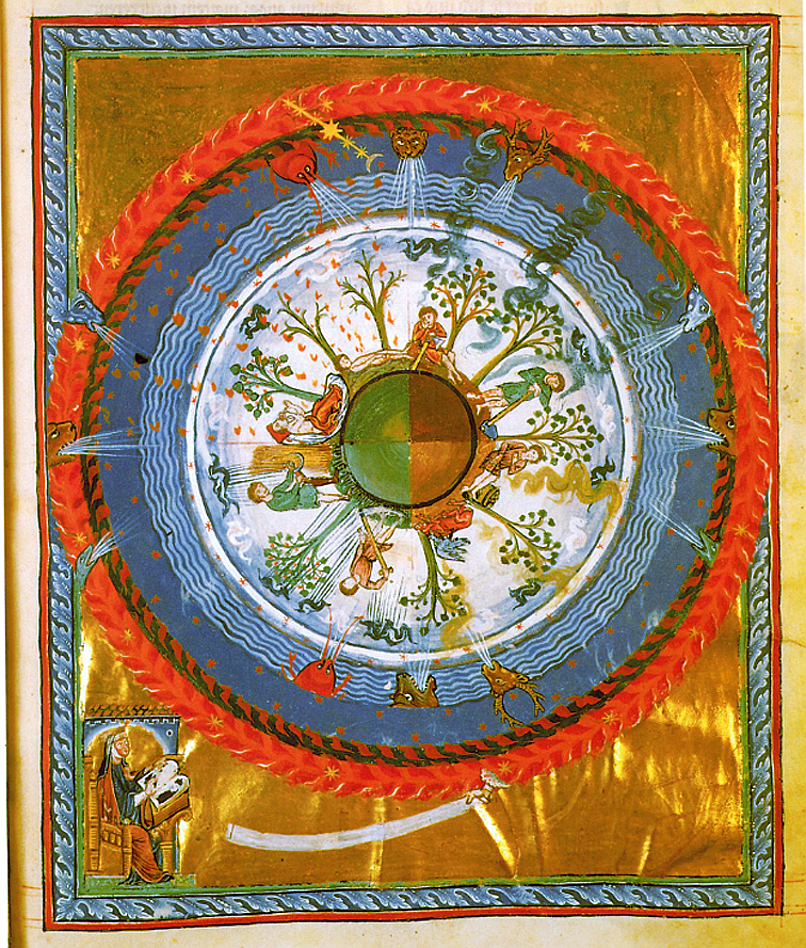
12th-century depiction of a spherical Earth with the four seasons (book Liber Divinorum Operum by Hildegard of Bingen)

A possible non-literary but graphic indication that people in the Middle Ages believed that the Earth (or perhaps the world) was a sphere is the use of the orb (globus cruciger) in the regalia of many kingdoms and of the Holy Roman Empire. It is attested from the time of the Christian late-Roman emperor Theodosius II (423) throughout the Middle Ages and in western Europe, the use of a physical orb is attested since at least the time of Emperor Henry II (d. 1024). A contemporary chronicler describes the imperial orb given to Henry II by Pope Benedict VIII as shaped like a golden apple surmounted by a cross and representing the earth with its rotundity. Such a Reichsapfel was likewise used in 1191 at the coronation of emperor Henry VI. There is, however, no record of a cartographical globe in the Middle Ages before the Erdapfel of Martin Behaim from 1492. Additionally the imperial orb could also represent of the entire "world" or cosmos.

A recent study of medieval concepts of the sphericity of the Earth noted that "after the eighth century the Globe became part of the world picture of medieval Christians without much more debate." From the ninth century, we likewise find discussion of Eratosthenes' method for calculating the sphericality of the earth in Carolingian commentaries on Martianus Capella. By the turn of the eleventh century, Hermann of Reichenau (1013–1054) includes a new method for replicating Eratosthenes' measurement using an astrolabe. For the wider population, however, it is difficult to say what they may have thought of the shape of the Earth if they considered the question at all.

==== Europe: High and Late Middle Ages ====
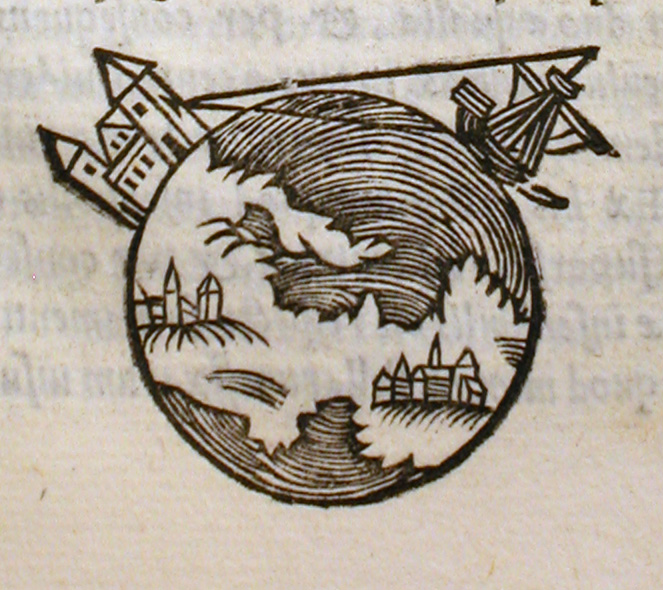
Picture from a 1550 edition of On the Sphere of the World, the most influential astronomy textbook of 13th-century Europe

The approximate sphericality of the Earth was universally accepted among scholastic authors of the High and Late Middle Ages. Evidence of its sphericality was discussed in standard university textbooks like John of Sacrobosco's On the Sphere of the World and flat earth theories played no role in discussions of the Earth's shape at medieval universities. The commonplace nature of this knowledge is illustrated by the highly influential theologian Thomas Aquinas (1225–1274), who uses it as an example of a fact that can be proved by two different sciences.

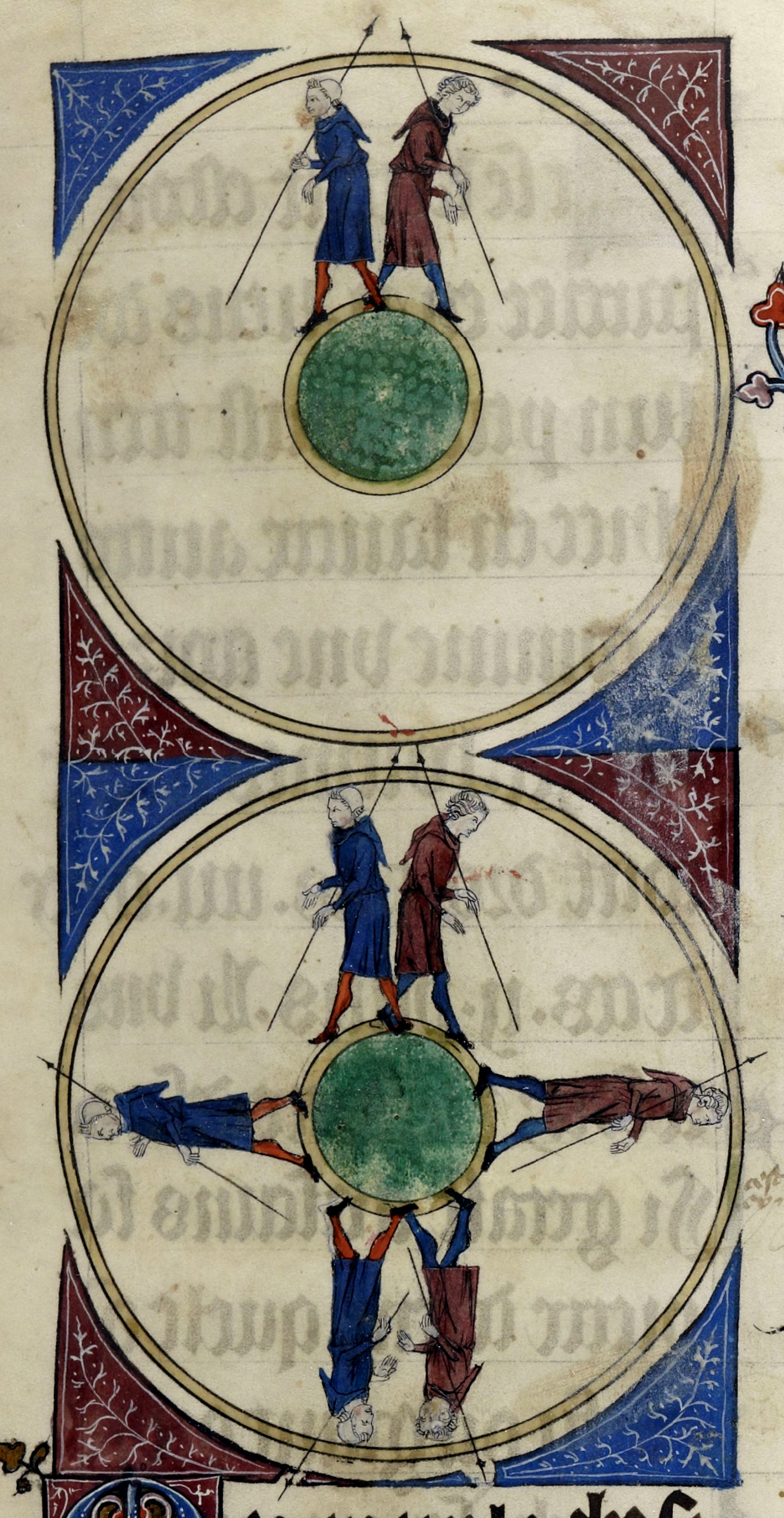
Illustration of the spherical Earth in a 14th-century copy of L'Image du monde (c. 1246)

Jill Tattersall shows that in many vernacular works in 12th- and 13th-century French texts the Earth was considered "round like a table" rather than "round like an apple". She writes, "[I]n virtually all the examples quoted ... from epics and from non-'historical' romances (that is, works of a less learned character) the actual form of words used suggests strongly a circle rather than a sphere", though she notes that even in these works the language is ambiguous.

Portuguese navigation down and around the coast of Africa in the latter half of the 1400s gave wide-scale observational evidence for Earth's sphericity. In these explorations, the Sun's position moved more northward the further south the explorers travelled. Its position directly overhead at noon gave evidence for crossing the equator. These apparent solar motions in detail were more consistent with north–south curvature and a distant Sun, than with any flat-Earth explanation. The ultimate demonstration came when Ferdinand Magellan's expedition completed the first global circumnavigation in 1521. Antonio Pigafetta, one of the few survivors of the voyage, recorded the loss of a day in the course of the voyage, giving evidence for east–west curvature.

==== Middle East: Islamic scholars ====
Prior to the introduction of Greek cosmology into the Islamic world, Muslims tended to view the Earth as flat, and Muslim traditionalists who rejected Greek philosophy continued to hold to this view later on while various theologians held opposing opinions. Beginning in the 10th century onwards, some Muslim traditionalists began to adopt the notion of a spherical Earth with the influence of Greek and Ptolemaic cosmology.

In Quranic cosmology, the Earth (al-arḍ) was "spread out." Whether or not this implies a flat Earth was debated by Muslims. Some modern historians believe the Quran saw the world as flat. On the other hand, the 12th-century commentary, the Tafsir al-Kabir (al-Razi) by Fakhr al-Din al-Razi argues that though this verse does describe a flat surface, it is limited in its application to local regions of the Earth which are roughly flat as opposed to the Earth as a whole. Others who would support a ball-shaped Earth included Ibn Hazm.

==== Ming Dynasty in China ====
A spherical terrestrial globe was introduced to Yuan-era Khanbaliq (i.e. Beijing) in 1267 by the Persian astronomer Jamal ad-Din, but it is not known to have made an impact on the traditional Chinese conception of the shape of the Earth. As late as 1595, an early Jesuit missionary to China, Matteo Ricci, recorded that the Ming-dynasty Chinese say: "The Earth is flat and square, and the sky is a round canopy; they did not succeed in conceiving the possibility of the antipodes."

In the 17th century, the idea of a spherical Earth spread in China due to the influence of the Jesuits, who held high positions as astronomers at the imperial court. Matteo Ricci, in collaboration with Chinese cartographers and translator Li Zhizao, published the Kunyu Wanguo Quantu in 1602, the first Chinese world map based on European discoveries. The astronomical and geographical treatise Gezhicao (格致草) written in 1648 by Xiong Mingyu (熊明遇) explained that the Earth was spherical, not flat or square, and could be circumnavigated.

=== Myth of flat-Earth prevalence ===
In the 17th century, a historical myth was created that asserted that the predominant cosmological doctrine during the Middle Ages was that the Earth was flat. The myth gained currency in the 19th century. An early proponent of this myth was the American writer Washington Irving, who maintained that Christopher Columbus had to overcome the opposition of churchmen to gain sponsorship for his voyage of exploration. Later significant advocates of this view were John William Draper and Andrew Dickson White, who used it as a major element in their advocacy of the thesis that there was a long-lasting and essential conflict between science and religion. Some studies of the historical connections between science and religion have demonstrated that theories of their mutual antagonism ignore examples of their mutual support.

Subsequent studies of medieval science have shown that most scholars in the Middle Ages, including those read by Christopher Columbus, maintained that the Earth was spherical.

== Modern flat Earth beliefs ==
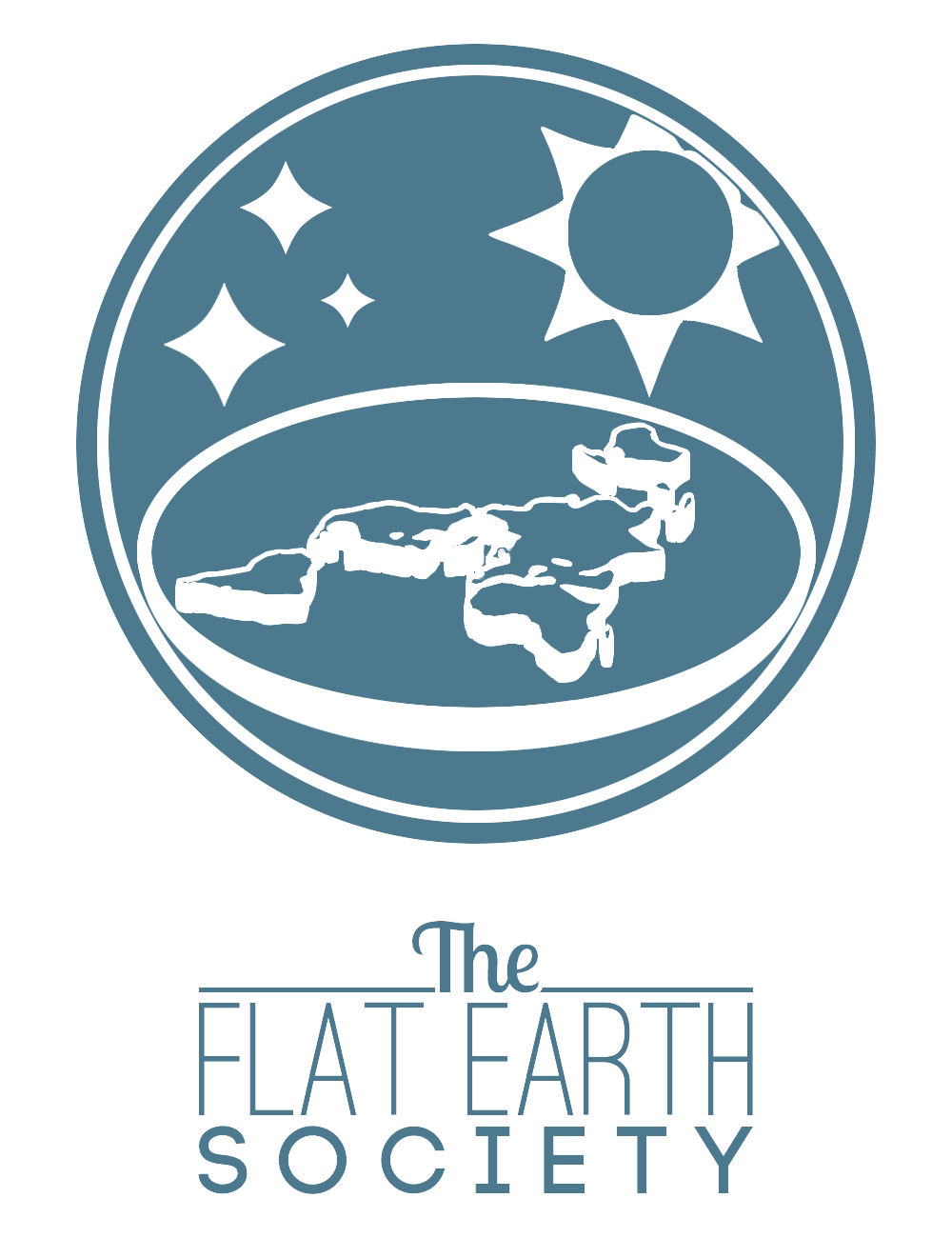
Logo of the Flat Earth Society

In the modern era, the pseudoscientific belief in a flat Earth originated with the English writer Samuel Rowbotham with the 1849 pamphlet Zetetic Astronomy. Lady Elizabeth Blount established the Universal Zetetic Society in 1893, which published journals. In 1956, Samuel Shenton set up the International Flat Earth Research Society, better known as the "Flat Earth Society" in Dover, England, as a direct descendant of the Universal Zetetic Society.

In the Internet era, the availability of communications technology and social media like YouTube, Facebook and Twitter have made it easy for individuals to spread disinformation and attract others to erroneous ideas, including that of the flat Earth.

Modern believers in a flat Earth face overwhelming publicly accessible evidence of Earth's sphericity. They also need to explain why governments, media outlets, schools, scientists, surveyors, airlines and other organizations accept that the world is spherical. To satisfy these tensions and maintain their beliefs, they generally embrace some form of conspiracy theory. In addition, believers tend to not trust observations they have not made themselves, and often distrust, disagree with or accuse each other of being in league with conspiracies.

== Education ==
While learning from their social environment, a child's perception of their physical environment sometimes leads to a false concept about the shape of Earth and what happens beyond the horizon. Some young children think that Earth ends there and that one can fall off the edge. Education helps them gradually change their belief into a realist one of a spherical Earth. On the other hand, many children do understand that the world is round, as confirmed by interviewing what the pictures they draw actually mean.

To counter misinformation about the shape of the Earth and other scientific issues, the National Center for Science Education has a site for supporting teachers.

== See also ==
- Alderson disk
- Denialism
- Earth ellipsoid
- Earth's rotation
- Empirical evidence for the spherical shape of Earth
- Geocentric creationism
- Geocentric model
- Geodesy
- Geographical distance
- Hollow Earth
- Pseudoscience
- Scientific myth
- Scientific skepticism
- Timeline of Earth estimates
- World Turtle
