= Aspidochelone =

Fabled sea creature

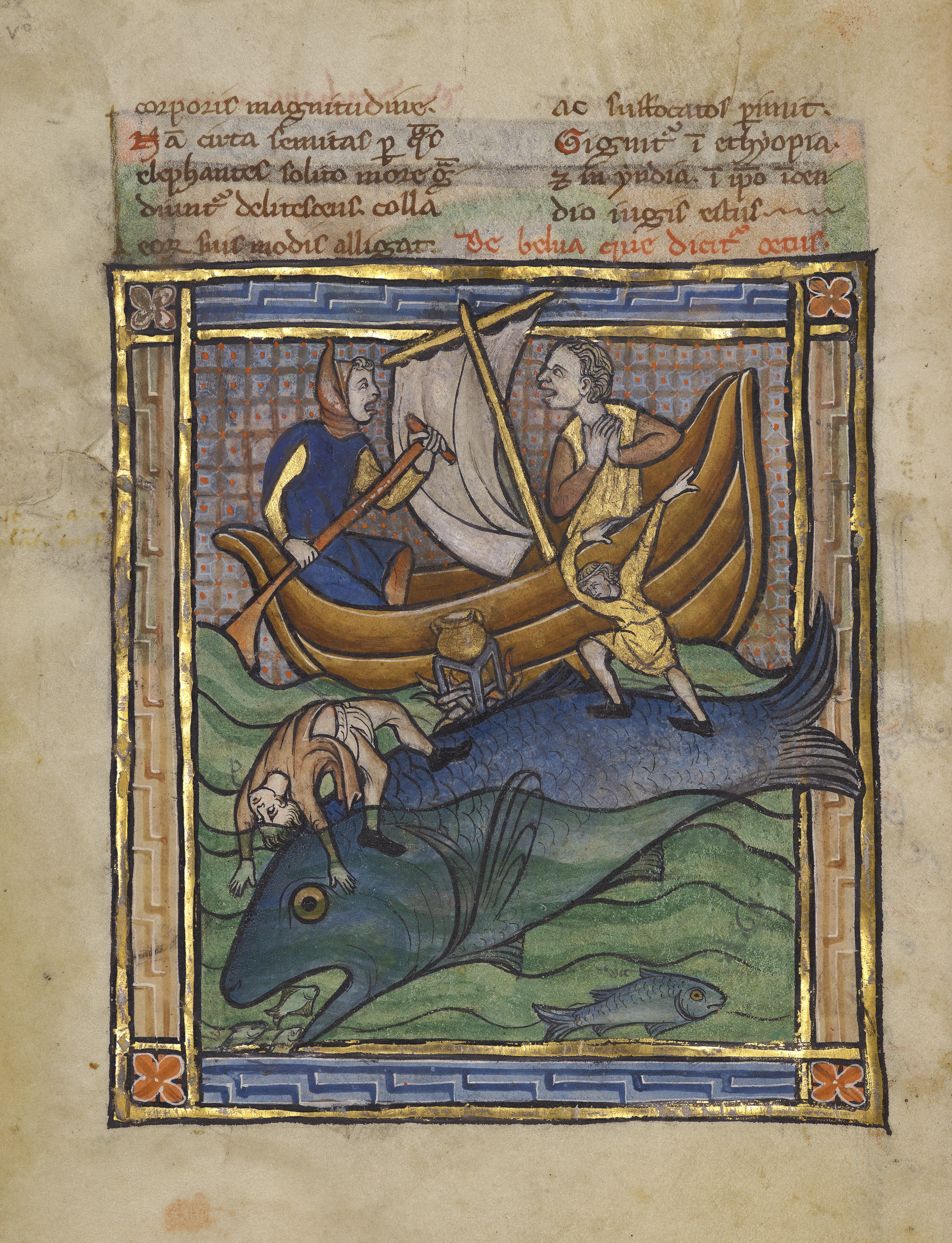
An Aspidochelone from a French manuscript, c. 1270. J. Paul Getty Museum

According to the tradition of the Physiologus and medieval bestiaries, the aspidochelone is a fabled sea creature, variously described as a large whale or vast sea turtle, and a giant sea monster with huge spines on the ridge of its back. No matter what form it is, it is always described as being so huge that it is often mistaken for a rocky island covered with sand dunes and vegetation. The name aspidochelone appears to be a compound word combining Greek aspis (which means either "asp" or "shield"), and chelone, the turtle. It rises to the surface from the depths of the sea, and entices unwitting sailors with its island appearance to make landfall on its huge shell and then the whale is able to pull them under the ocean, ship and all the people, drowning them. It also emits a sweet smell that lures fish into its trap where it then devours them. In the moralistic allegory of the Physiologus and bestiary tradition, the aspidochelone represents Satan, who deceives those whom he seeks to devour.

== Origins ==
The oldest version of the Aspidochelone legend is found in the Physiologus (2nd century AD):

There is a monster in the sea which in Greek is called aspidochelone, in Latin "asp-turtle"; it is a great whale, that has what appear to be beaches on its hide, like those from the sea-shore. This creature raises its back above the waves of the sea, so that sailors believe that it is just an island, so that when they see it, it appears to them to be a sandy beach such as is common along the sea-shore. Believing it to be an island, they beach their ship alongside it, and disembarking, they plant stakes and tie up the ships. Then, in order to cook a meal after this work, they make fires on the sand as if on land. But when the monster feels the heat of these fires, it immediately submerges into the water, and pulls the ship into the depths of the sea.

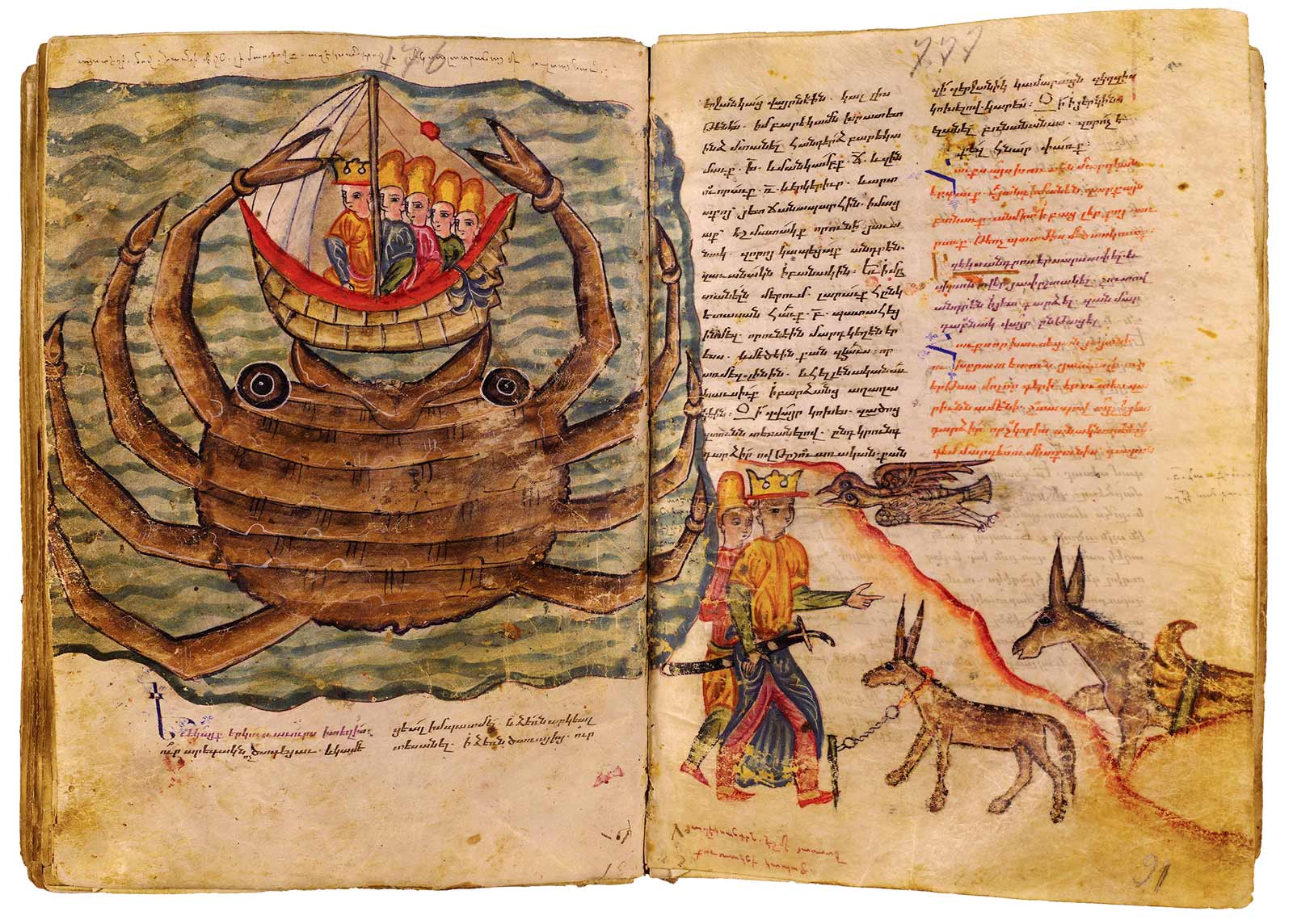
Alexander Romance, Armenian manuscript, 1538–1544

The Alexander Romance includes the story of a "monster" confused as an island in Alexander's letter to Aristotle: "After they landed on the so-called island and an hour passed, suddenly it proved to be no island, but a monster which plunged into the sea. We shouted and it disappeared, but some of my companions met a wretched death, among them my best friend." Another sea monster, which attacks Alexander and his companions, is identified as "a lobster" in the Armenian version of the Alexander Romance, or "beasts that are called crabs" by Leo Archpriest.

== Qorha ==
In the Babylonian Talmud (Baba Batra 73a), Rabbah bar bar Hana states: "Once we were traveling on a ship and we saw a certain fish upon which sand had settled, and grass grew on it. We assumed that it was dry land and went up and baked and cooked on the back of the fish, but when its back grew hot it turned over. And were it not for the fact that the ship was close by, we would have drowned." This monster is called Qorha in a poem by Jewish scholar Samuel ibn Naghrillah.

== Biblical whales ==
Sea monsters so great as islands appear in biblical commentaries. Basil of Caesarea in his Hexameron says the following about the "great whales" (Hebrew tannin) mentioned in the fifth day of creation (Genesis 1:21):

Scripture gives them the name of great not because they are greater than a shrimp and a sprat, but because the size of their bodies equals that of great hills. Thus when they swim on the surface of the waters one often sees them appear like islands. But these monstrous creatures do not frequent our coasts and shores; they inhabit the Atlantic ocean. Such are these animals created to strike us with terror and awe. If now you hear say that the greatest vessels, sailing with full sails, are easily stopped by a very small fish, by the remora, and so forcibly that the ship remains motionless for a long time, as if it had taken root in the middle of the sea, do you not see in this little creature a like proof of the power of the Creator?

The Pseudo-Eustatius Commentary on the Hexameron connects this passage with Aspidochelone mentioned in the Physiologus.

The allegory of the Aspidochelone borrows from the account of whales in Saint Isidore of Seville's Etymologiae. Isidore cites the prophet Jonah; the Vulgate translation of the Book of Jonah translates Jonah 2:2 as Exaudivit me de ventre inferni: "He (the Lord) heard me from the belly of Hell". He concludes that such whales must have bodies as large as mountains.

== Saratan ==
The Arabic polymath Al-Jahiz, writer of Kitāb al-Hayawān (The Book of Animals), mentions three monsters that are supposed to live in the sea: the tanin (sea-dragon), the saratan (سرطان, or saraṭān, "crab") and the bala (whale). About the saratan, he said the following:

As to the sarathan, I have never yet met anybody who could assure me he had seen it with his own eyes. Of course, if we were to believe all that sailors tell [...] for they claim that on occasions they have landed on certain islands having woods and valleys and fissures and have lit a great fire; and when the monster felt the fire on its back, it began to glide away with them and all the plants growing on it, so that only such as managed to flee were saved. This tale outdoes the most fabulous and preposterous of stories.

This monster is also mentioned in The Wonders of Creation, written by al-Qazwini, and in the first voyage of Sinbad the Sailor in One Thousand and One Nights.

The saratan also appears in Jorge Luis Borges's work El Libro de Los Seres Imaginarios (The Book of Imaginary Beings), where its name is spelled "zaratan," a spelling which readers of Borges have adopted in reference to this creature. Borges describes saratans as having long-life spans and incredible size, to the point where their shells can be mistaken easily enough as small islands. Borges cites Al-Jahiz and the Kitāb al-Hayawān for this information, and notes Al-Jahiz's skepticism, which he contrasts with al-Qazwini's account.

== Jasconius ==
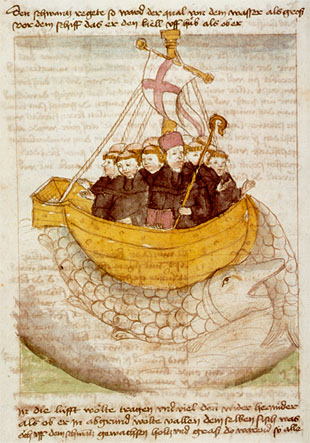
Brendan and his monks' ship is carried by a giant fish in a German manuscript.

A similar monster appears in the Legend of Saint Brendan, where it was called Jasconius. Because of its size, Brendan and his fellow voyagers mistake it for an island and land to make camp. They celebrate Easter on the sleeping giant's back, but awaken it when they light their campfire. They race to their ship, and Brendan explains that the moving island is really Jasconius, who labors unsuccessfully to put its tail in its mouth.

== Fastitocalon ==
A similar tale is told by the Old English poem "The Whale", where the monster appears under the name fastitocalon. The poem has an unknown author, and is one of three poems in the Old English Physiologus, also known as the Bestiary, in the Exeter Book, folio 96b-97b, that are allegorical in nature, the other two being "The Panther" and "The Partridge". The Exeter book is now in the Exeter Cathedral library. The book has suffered from multiple mutilations and it is possible that some of the manuscript is missing. It is believed that the book had been used as a “beer mat”, a cutting board, and suffered other types of mutilation by its previous owners. The Physiologus has gone through many different translations into many different languages throughout the world. It is possible that the content has also been changed throughout the centuries.

Nu ic fitte gen ymb fisca cynn
wille woðcræfte wordum cyþan
þurh modgemynd bi þam miclan hwale.
Se bið unwillum oft gemeted,
frecne ond ferðgrim, fareðlacendum,
niþþa gehwylcum; þam is noma cenned,
fyrnstreama geflotan, Fastitocalon.

This time I will with poetic art rehearse,
by means of words and wit,
a poem about a kind of fish,
the great sea-monster which is often unwillingly met,
terrible and cruel-hearted to seafarers,
yea, to every man; this swimmer of the ocean-streams
is known as the asp-turtle.

Is þæs hiw gelic hreofum stane,
swylce worie bi wædes ofre,
sondbeorgum ymbseald, særyrica mæst,
swa þæt wenaþ wægliþende
þæt hy on ealond sum eagum wliten,
ond þonne gehydað heahstefn scipu
to þam unlonde oncyrrapum.

His appearance is like that of a rough boulder,
as if there were tossing by the shore
a great ocean-reedbank begirt with sand-dunes,
so that seamen imagine they are gazing upon an island,
and moor their high-prowed ships with cables to that false land,
make fast the ocean-coursers at the sea's end,
and, bold of heart, climb up.

The moral of the story remains the same:

Swa bið scinna þeaw,
deofla wise, þæt hi drohtende
þurh dyrne meaht duguðe beswicað,
ond on teosu tyhtaþ tilra dæda.

Such is the way of demons, the wont of devils: they spend their lives in outwitting men by their secret power, inciting them to the corruption of good deeds, misguiding.

In The Adventures of Tom Bombadil, J. R. R. Tolkien made a little verse that claimed the name "Fastitocalon" from The Whale, and told a similar story:

Look, there is Fastitocalon!
An island good to land upon,
Although 'tis rather bare.
Come, leave the sea! And let us run,
Or dance, or lie down in the sun!
See, gulls are sitting there!
Beware!

As such, Tolkien imported the traditional tale of the aspidochelone into the lore of his Middle-earth.

== Natural science research ==
According to John McCarthy et al. (2023) the myth of Aspidochelone could be explained by cetacean trap feeding, a behaviour, for example, viewed in rorqual whales (Balaenopteridae). This research was mentioned on March 28, 2024 in the German TV-quiz-show “Wer weiss denn sowas“ (minute 26:00 ff.).

== In modern fiction ==
The name Jasconius is used for the whale in the children's book The Adventures of Louey and Frank by Carolyn White. She attributes the name to having grown up with the legend of Brendan.

== See also ==
- Kraken
- Vanishing island
- Pumice raft
- World Turtle
- Leviathan
