= Jews and the Crusades =

Role of the Jews in the Crusades

The history of the Jews and the Crusades is part of the history of antisemitism toward Jews in the Middle Ages. The call for the First Crusade intensified the persecutions of the Jews, and they continued to be targets of Crusaders' violence and hatred throughout the Crusades.

== Background ==
The dispersion of the Jewish community occurred following the Destruction of the Second Temple, with many Jews settling in different regions across Europe and the Middle East. During this time, several Jewish communities coalesced across the Levant in approximately fifty known locations, including Jerusalem, Tiberias, Ramleh, Ashkelon and Caesarea. Many of these communities were attacked by Crusader forces on their mission to capture the Holy Land.

Christian sources justified attacking Jewish communities as a means of seizing wealth and supplies. One Christian priest, commenting on the behavior of the Crusaders in the Balkans, wrote:

"This is believed to be the hand of the Lord working against the pilgrims, who sinned in his sight with their great impurity and intercourse with prostitutes and slaughtered the wandering Jews, who admittedly were contrary to Christ, more from avarice for money than for the justice of God."

== First Crusade ==
=== Pogroms of European Jews by Crusaders ===
In the First Crusade, Jewish communities on the Rhine and the Danube were attacked by Crusaders, while others were spared due to the efforts of the Papacy (see the Rhineland massacres). In the Second Crusade (1147), the Jews in France suffered especially. The severity of the massacres was such that word reached Jewish communities in the Middle East, inspiring Messianic fervor. Philip II of France treated them with exceptional severity during the Third Crusade (1188). The Jews were also subjected to attacks by the Shepherds' Crusades of 1251 and 1320.

The attacks were opposed by the local bishops at the time as a violation of the crusades' aims, which were not directed against the Jews. However, the perpetrators mostly escaped legal punishment. The social position of the Jews in western Europe worsened, and legal restrictions increased during and after the crusades. This led to the anti-Jewish legislation of Pope Innocent III. The crusades constituted a turning point in the relationship between Jews and Christians.

=== Defending the Holy Land ===
==== Siege of Haifa ====
The Muslims and Jews allied to defend Haifa against the crusaders, holding out in the besieged town for a month (June–July 1099). When the Crusaders breached the citadel, they killed everyone they found, both Jews and Muslims.

==== Siege of Jerusalem ====
Jews again fought together with Muslim soldiers to defend Jerusalem against the Crusaders. Saint Louis University Professor Thomas F. Madden, author of A Concise History of the Crusades, claims the "Jewish Defenders" of the city knew the rules of warfare and retreated to their synagogue to "prepare for death" since the Crusaders had breached the outer walls. According to the Muslim chronicle of Ibn al-Qalanisi, "The Jews assembled in their synagogue, and the Franks burned it over their heads." One modern-day source even claims the Crusaders "[circled] the screaming, flame-tortured humanity, singing 'Christ We Adore Thee!' with their Crusader crosses held high." However, a contemporary Jewish communication does not corroborate the report that Jews were actually inside of the Synagogue when it was set fire. This letter was discovered among the Cairo Geniza collection in 1975 by historian Shelomo Dov Goitein. Historians believe that it was written just two weeks after the siege, making it "the earliest account on the conquest in any language." However, sources agree that a synagogue was burned during the siege.

=== Ransoming ===
Following the siege, Jews captured from the Dome of the Rock, along with native Christians, were made to clean the city of the slain. Tancred took some Jews as prisoners of war and deported them to Apulia in southern Italy. Several of these Jews did not make it to their final destination, as "Many of them were […] thrown into the sea or beheaded on the way." Numerous Jews and their holy books (including the Aleppo Codex) were held ransom by Raymond of Toulouse. The Karaite Jewish community of Ashkelon (Ascalon) reached out to their coreligionists in Alexandria to first pay for the holy books and thereafter rescued pockets of Jews over several months. All of those that could be ransomed were liberated by the summer of 1100, with the few who could not either converted to Christianity or killed.

=== Protection attempts by Christians in Western Christendom ===
Prior to the First Crusade, there are multiple accounts of cooperation between Christians and Jews. Not only was there economic collaboration, with Jews being involved in several industries such as trade, minting, and financial advising, but Jews and Christians were also social with one another, even attending each other's weddings and funerals.

As the Crusades spread and reached different towns and cities, several Christians attempted to protect Jewish people, including initially the local bishop of the German city of Trier. The bishop was still new to the city, however, and did not have the political power necessary to band the town together. In the face of the crusaders' attack, the local bishop abandoned his attempt to save the Jews and told them that "You cannot be saved—your God does not wish to save you now as he did in earlier day. "Behold this large crowd that stands before the gateway of the palace", as well as forcing them to choose between conversion and removal from his palace.

Other German cities had similar experiences, with some towns, such as Mainz, having the local burghers fight against the incoming crusaders. Another German town, Cologne, hid all the local Jews among their Christian neighbors during the Jewish holiday of Shavuot, spending the remainder of the holiday with the Christian acquaintances.

== Jewish crusade literature ==
The end of the crusades brought with it many narratives coming from both Jewish and Christian sources. Among the better-known Jewish narratives are the chronicles of Solomon Bar Simson, the chronicle of Rabbi Eliezer bar Nathan, The Narrative of the Old Persecutions by Mainz Anonymous, and Sefer Zekhirah, or The Book of Remembrance, by Rabbi Ephraim of Bonn.

The Solomon bar Simson Chronicle (1140) is mostly a record of what happened during the period of the First Crusade. He focuses mainly on events in Rhineland in 1096. Bar Simson accurately discusses the martyrdom of the communities more than the rare conversion of individuals.

The Chronicle of Rabbi Eliezer bar Nathan (mid-12th century) is known to be written by a person named Rabbi Eliezer bar Nathan, who was very popular in his time due to his writings. He is thought to have borrowed much of his information from Bar Simson, since much of the information is the same. His writing here is emotional, taking on a more apocalyptic tone in a sense. There is a definite sense of personal experience coming out of this chronicle, experience with death and suffering within his community and others. This chronicle was extremely popular at the time, as several manuscripts were written about it in a myriad of places.

The Narrative of the Old Persecutions (14th century), as the lack of the author's name implies, is from an unknown author. The main focus of this narrative is on Mainz, and takes a very realistic stance on the crusades. It tells of the complacency of Rhenish Jews, of the reactions that Mainz Jews had to news of other communities falling to the crusaders, and of their turn towards the Church to protect them, only to find more despair there. It also brings in some information coming from the late Middle Ages, of Jews being associated with well poisoning.

Robert Chazan's God, Humanity, and History and Shlomo Eidelberg's The Jews and the Crusades, each of which gives background to the narratives and discusses their effects on European Jewry and Christianity.

Chazan's In the Year 1096: The First Crusade and the Jews provides details as to the changes made in Jewish/Christian relations resulting from the First Crusade. He focuses on whether or not the crusades really had a salient impact on the Jews of the time and in the future, pointing out that persecution was nothing new to them, yet also talking about the importance of their being made extremely distinct within the European community by the crusades. They were no longer part of it to any great extent but were made out to be part of the "others" as many in Europe already had been, such as atheists and pagans.

=== Christian crusade literature ===
Christian sources for information on general feelings after the First Crusade all focus on their acquisition of Jerusalem. William of Tyre, Fulcher of Chartres, the Venetian Treaty, the Travels of Saewulf, and John of Wurzburg's Pilgrim Guide all detail Jerusalem but have little, if anything, to say of Europe and the Jews. However, amidst the Crusade there were several Christian documents on the crusaders' attacks on Jewish communities and the basis of those attacks. One such document is Albert of Aachen on the People's Crusade, which focuses on the unsanctioned, disorganized peasant crusades that occurred along with the organized crusader campaigns on Jerusalem. It provides the personal experiences of Aachen, who was in one of these peasant crusades, and provides accounts of the slaughter of several groups of Jews. He describes it as being either "judgment of the Lord" or "some error of mind," and the killings as not only being indiscriminate with no exception. His account also shows the Church being able to achieve little in its attempts to prevent these massacres.

Much of the focus of Christian writings of the time, however, was on the efforts to get to Jerusalem, though some accounts talk of the crusaders' distrust of the Byzantine Empire, accounts that show some of the reasoning for the Fourth Crusade and the sack of Constantinople. The Deeds of the Franks, which has an unknown author, is such an account, and has a clear bias against the Byzantines. Many of the writings on later crusades continue to also focus on Jerusalem until the end of the crusades when Jerusalem stops being their focus and the return to stability in Europe does.

Many of the secondary sources on this time period question how important the impact of the crusades was on both the Jewish and Christian communities. Robert Chazan believes in the end – both cultures were, in many ways, used to the persecution that was being enacted, and that this was just another step. R. I. Moore, within his book The Formation of a Persecuting Society, argues that the effect on Christians was huge, with their entire society gaining feelings of the need for separation from their Jewish neighbors, which allowed them to persecute further in the future. Ivan G. Marcus in his article The Culture of the Early Ashkenaz argues that the Jews pulled away from the Christian community physically, mentally, and spiritually due to the sheer ferocity and shocking nature of the crusades. All of these and more provide differing opinions on the results of the crusades, but all agree that the crusades caused a separation between the two religions.

== See also ==
- Rhineland massacres
- Worms massacre (1096)
- First Crusade
