= William Henry Carpenter =

William Henry Carpenter may refer to:

- William H. Carpenter (1821–1885), American diplomat
- William Henry Carpenter (philologist) (1853–1936), American philologist
- William Carpenter (Australian politician) (1863–1930), Australian politician

== See also ==
- William Carpenter (disambiguation)
