= William Carpenter =

William, Will, Willie, or Bill Carpenter may refer to:

== Arts and entertainment ==
- William Carpenter (painter) (1818–1899), English watercolour artist
- William Carpenter (writer) (born 1940), American poet and novelist
- Willie C. Carpenter (fl. 1970s–2020s), American actor

== Law and politics ==
- William H. Carpenter (1821–1885), U.S. Consul to Fuzhou, China, during the American Civil War
- William L. Carpenter (Michigan judge) (1854–1936), American jurist in Michigan
- William Carpenter (Australian politician) (1863–1930), Australian politician
- William Randolph Carpenter (1894–1956), US congressman
- Will Carpenter (born 1956), American politician

== Science and medicine ==
- William Marbury Carpenter (1811–1848), American physician and naturalist
- William Benjamin Carpenter (1813–1885), English physiologist and naturalist
- William L. Carpenter (1844–1898), American naturalist and geologist
- William T. Carpenter, American psychiatrist
- Will Dockery Carpenter (1930–2023), American scientist and philanthropist

== Sports ==
- William J. Carpenter (1827–1921), American outdoorsman
- Bill Carpenter (rugby league) (fl. 1920s–1930s), Australian rugby league player
- Ken Carpenter (discus thrower) (William Kenneth Carpenter, 1913–1984), American discus thrower
- Bill Carpenter (born 1937), American football player

== Others ==
- William the Carpenter (fl. 1087–1102), French nobleman
- William Carpenter (Rhode Island colonist) (c. 1610–1685), American colonist in Rhode Island
- William Hookham Carpenter (1792–1866), British antiquary, keeper at the British Museum
- William Carpenter (1797–1874), English theological and political writer
- William Carpenter (flat-Earth theorist) (1830–1896), English advocate of the Flat Earth theory
- William Boyd Carpenter (1841–1918), English clergyman and bishop
- William Henry Carpenter (philologist) (1853–1936), American philologist
- William Thomas Carpenter (1854–1933), American cowman and author
- William Kyle Carpenter, (born 1989), U.S. Marines Medal of Honor recipient

== See also ==
- List of people with surname Carpenter#W
