= Eric Dubay =

American conspiracy theorist

- Born: 20th century
- Occupation: YouTuber
- Years active: 2014–present

Eric Dubay is an American conspiracy theorist, internet personality, author, and yoga instructor who has been credited as one of the leading figures in the pseudoscientific modern Flat Earth movement. He gained prominence online following the self-publication of his 2014 book The Flat-Earth Conspiracy and a video titled "200 Proofs Earth Is Not a Spinning Ball".

== Career ==
Dubay operated an online blog in the 2000s, which promoted anti-Semitic conspiracy theories. He self-published his first book in 2009 about the New World Order conspiracy theory. According to Dubay, he was initially "on the fence" about the Earth's shape, but had already been convinced of the veracity of geocentrism, becoming a full proponent of the Flat Earth conspiracy theory by the end of 2009. That year, Dubay sent a link to the works of 19th-century Flat Earth proponent Samuel Rowbotham to Alex Jones, who responded by publicly ridiculing Dubay in his broadcasts.

Dubay began publishing YouTube videos in support of the Flat Earth in 2014, inspired by the work of Alex Jones. One of his most popular videos is 200 Proofs Earth Is Not a Spinning Ball,, which was inspired by William Carpenter's 1885 text One Hundred Proofs That the Earth Is Not a Globe. Its popularity led to debunking from other YouTubers, and the formation of a group of Flat Earth YouTubers in 2014 and 2015. In 2017, Dubay's main YouTube account was deleted, but he managed to re-upload his content to a second channel. Dubay appeared in the 2018 documentary Behind the Curve.

Eric Dubay has been described by Flat Earth proponent Mark Sargent as "one of our more fringe figures." He has self-produced multiple rap albums dedicated to the subject of Flat Earth, as well as a picture book for children which remains in wide circulation among Flat Earth homeschooling parents.Dubay's works remain widely read and highly influential in modern Flat Earth circles, and he maintains a group of dedicated followers. His work has also influenced figures such as B.o.B and Tila Tequila.

== Views ==
=== Flat Earth ===
Dubay has claimed to be the chief modern revivalist of the Flat Earth conspiracy theory. According to Dubay, his views were inspired by the writings of Samuel Rowbotham and William Carpenter. Dubay has stated that the Flat Earth Society is a fake group with a goal of discrediting the Flat Earth movement, and has labeled Flat Earth proponent Patricia Steere a "shill."

=== Anti-semitism and Neo-Nazism ===
Dubay is an advocate of Holocaust denial, and has been described as a Neo-Nazi. He has described Adolf Hitler as a "vegetarian, animal lover", and in a 2018 video titled Adolf Hitler vs. The Jew World Order stated Hitler was "beloved by his people, and he wanted nothing but peace." Dubay also stated that Jews had a propensity towards animal cruelty resulting from alleged ritual human sacrifices. He has accused Alex Jones of being a "fake conspiracy theorist" due to Jones's insufficient belief in anti-Semitic conspiracy theories. Author Kelly Weill has written that nearly all points made in Dubay's 2018 video are misleading or incorrect. He has also been criticized by fellow Flat Earth proponent David Weiss, who stated Dubay had gone "too far" and had "poisoned the well with this Hitler stuff."

=== Other views ===
Dubay is a vegan. He has produced videos in which he states that humans are not omnivorous and advocates for a raw vegan diet as a cure for many diseases including cancer, autism and diabetes. Dubay is opposed to the use of vaccines.

== Personal life ==
Dubay lives in Thailand, and is a yoga instructor. He is an adherent of New Age spiritual beliefs.

== Select bibliography ==
- Flatlantis. Lulu.com. 2020. ISBN 9781716728600.
- 200 Proofs Earth Is Not a Spinning Ball. CreateSpace. 2018. ISBN 9781727646467.
- The Earth Plane. CreateSpace. 2018. ISBN 9781727430462.
- The Flat-Earth Conspiracy. Lulu.com. 2014. ISBN 9781312627161.
- The Atlantean Conspiracy. Lulu.com. 2013. ISBN 9781304634399.
- Spiritual Science. Lulu.com. 2012. ISBN 9781105940743.
