= Rhineland massacres =

Pogroms of 1096

Rhineland massacres - German Crusade of 1096
- Part of the People's Crusade
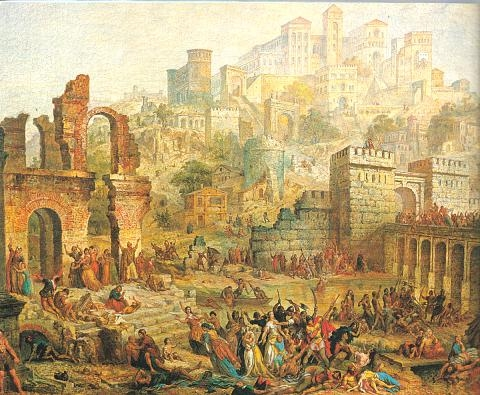
- Massacre of the Jews of Metz during the First Crusade, by the 19th-century painter Auguste Migette
- Location: Speyer, Worms, Mainz, Cologne, Metz, Trier
- Date: 1096; 4856 (by the Hebrew calendar)
- Target: French and German Jews
- Victims: 2,000 Jews
- Perpetrator: People's Crusade
- Motive: Antisemitism

The Rhineland massacres, also known as the German Crusade of 1096 (Hebrew: גזרות תתנ״ו, romanized: Gezērot-Tatnu, lit. 'Edicts of 4856'), were a series of mass murders of Jews in the Rhineland (part of the Holy Roman Empire) which took place in 1096 (4856 in the Hebrew calendar). They were perpetrated by mobs of Christian French and German peasants during the People's Crusade.

Prominent leaders of crusaders involved in the massacres included Peter the Hermit and, especially, Count Emicho. Part of this murderous violence, namely the destruction of Jewish communities in Speyer, Worms and Mainz, was recorded as the Destruction of the SHUM (Hebrew: חורבן שו״ם, romanized: Ḥurban Shum), Shum being the abbreviation of the names of these three cities in Old French. Many historians have referred to the violence as pogroms.

== Background ==
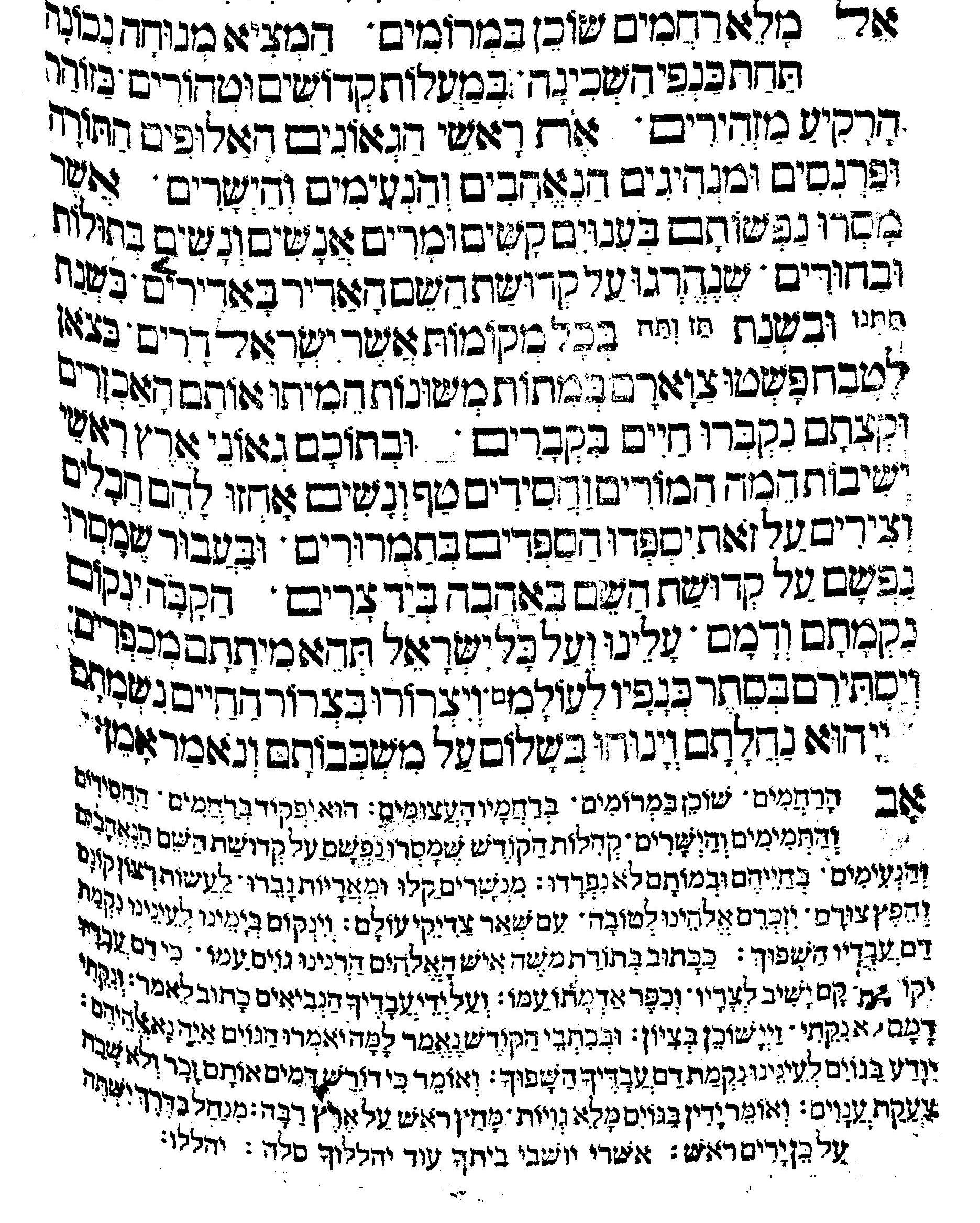
El Malé Rahamim – God of Mercy prayer for the murdered communities, in prayer book from the city of Altona

While none of the Crusades explicitly targeted Jews, the fervor for religious war sometimes turned into outbreaks of anti-Jewish violence in Europe, even though both ecclesiastical and secular authorities condemned it. The focus on the Crucifixion of Jesus and the call for violence against enemies of the Christian faith during the Crusades, as exemplified by the preaching of Pope Urban II in 1095–1096 and Bernard of Clairvaux in 1146–1147, was additionally translated into animosity towards Jews. In French and German regions, Jews were perceived as just as much an enemy as Muslims were: they were held responsible for the Crucifixion, and they were more immediately visible than the distant Muslims. Many people wondered why they should travel great distances to fight "non-believers" when there were already "non-believers" closer to home.

It is also likely that the Crusaders were motivated by their need for money. Jewish Rhineland communities were relatively wealthy, both because they were isolated and because the Jews were not restricted as Catholics were against moneylending. Many crusaders had to go into debt in order to purchase weaponry and equipment for the expedition; as the Catholic Church strictly forbade usury, many crusaders inevitably found themselves indebted to Jewish moneylenders. Having armed themselves by assuming the debt, the crusaders rationalized the killing of Jews as an extension of their Catholic mission.

There had not been so broad a movement against Jews by Catholics since the 7th century's mass expulsions and forced conversions. While there had been regional persecutions of Jews by Catholics—such as in Metz in 888, a plot against Jews in Limoges in 992, a wave of anti-Jewish persecution by Christian millenarian movements, which believed that Jesus was immediately going to descend from Heaven in the year 1000, and the threat of expulsion from Trier in 1066. These are all viewed "in the traditional terms of governmental outlawry rather than unbridled popular attacks." Also, many movements against Jews (such as forced conversions by King Robert the Pious of France, Richard II of Normandy, and Henry II, Holy Roman Emperor around 1007–1012) were suppressed by various popes and bishops. The passions that were aroused within the Catholic community by Pope Urban II's call for the First Crusade had moved the persecution of Jews into a new chapter in history where previous constraints no longer held.

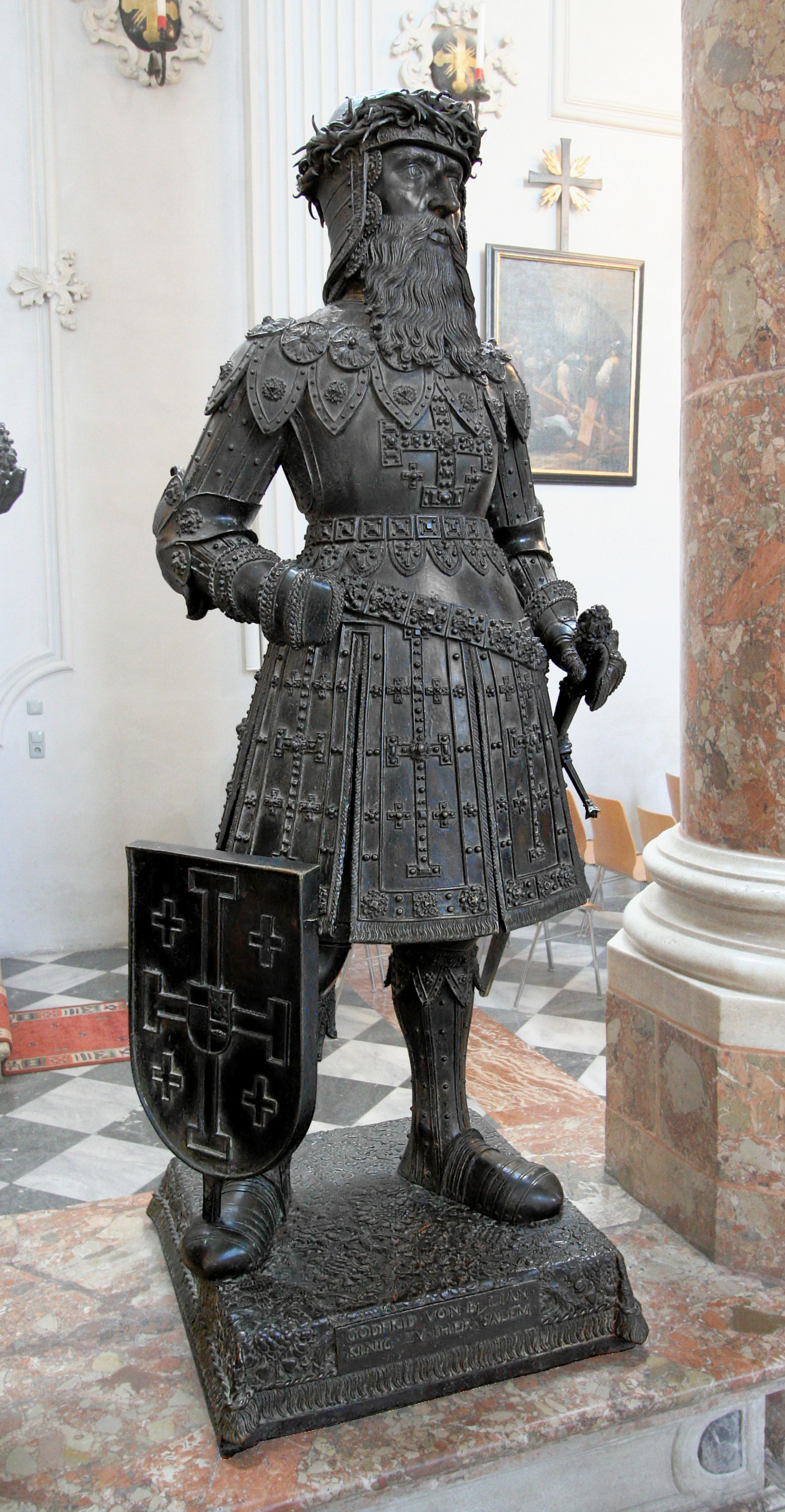
Sixteenth-century bronze statue of Godfrey of Bouillon from the group of heroes surrounding the memorial to Maximilian I, Holy Roman Emperor in the Court Church in Innsbruck

A relevant perspective on the extent of the era's antisemitism was recorded 40 years afterward by Jewish historian Solomon bar Simson. He states that Godfrey of Bouillon swore:

to go on this journey only after avenging the blood of the crucified one by shedding Jewish blood and completely eradicating any trace of those bearing the name 'Jew', thus assuaging his own burning wrath.

Emperor Henry IV, after being notified of the pledge by Kalonymus ben Meshullam, the Jewish leader in Mainz, issued an order prohibiting such an action. Godfrey claimed that he never really intended to kill Jews, but the communities in Mainz and Cologne sent him a collected bribe of 500 silver marks.

Sigebert of Gembloux writes that before "a war in behalf of the Lord" could be fought, it was essential that the Jews convert; those who resisted were "deprived of their goods, massacred, and expelled from the cities."

The first outbreaks of violence occurred in France. According to a contemporary chronicle of events written by an anonymous author in Mainz: "There first arose the officers, nobles, and common people who were in the land of France [Sarefat] who took counsel together and plotted...to make clear the way to go toward Jerusalem."

Richard of Poitiers writes that Jewish persecution was widespread in France at the beginning of the expeditions to the east. The anonymous chronicler of Mainz admired the Jews:

At the time, the [Jewish] communities in France heard [about these things], trembling...seized them. They wrote letters and sent messengers to all the communities around about the River Rhine, [to the effect] that they should fast...and seek mercy from Him who dwells on high, that He might save them from their hands. When the letter reached the holy ones in the land [of the Rhine], namely the men of renown ... in Mainz, they responded [to their brethren in] France as follows: 'The communities have decreed a fast. We have done that which was ours [to do]. May the Lord save us and may He save you from all sorrow and oppression [which might come] upon you. We are in great fear.'

In June and July 1095, Jewish communities in the Rhineland (north of the main departure areas at Neuss, Grevenbroich, Altenahr, Xanten and Moers) were attacked, but the leadership and membership of these Crusader groups were not chronicled. Some Jews dispersed eastward to escape the persecution. On top of the general Catholic suspicion of Jews at the time, when the thousands of French members of the People's Crusade arrived at the Rhine, they had run out of provisions. To restock their supplies, they began to plunder Jewish food and property while attempting to force them to convert to Catholicism.

Peter the Hermit preaching the First Crusade, as cited in the 1851 "Illustrated London Reading Book"

Not all crusaders who had run out of supplies resorted to murder; some, like Peter the Hermit, used extortion instead. While no sources claim he preached against the Jews, he carried a letter with him from the Jews of France to the community at Trier. The letter urged them to provision Peter and his men. The Solomon bar Simson Chronicle records that they were so terrified by Peter's appearance at the gates that they readily agreed to supply his needs. Whatever Peter's own position on the Jews was, men claiming to follow after him felt free to massacre Jews on their own initiative, to pillage their possessions. Sometimes Jews survived by being subjected to involuntary baptism, such as in Regensburg, where a crusading mob rounded up the Jewish community, forced them into the Danube, and performed a mass baptism. After the crusaders had left the region, these Jews returned to practicing Judaism.

According to David Nirenberg, the events of 1096 in the Rhineland "occupy a significant place in modern Jewish historiography and are often presented as the first instance of an antisemitism that would henceforth never be forgotten and whose climax was the Holocaust."

== Volkmar and Gottschalk ==
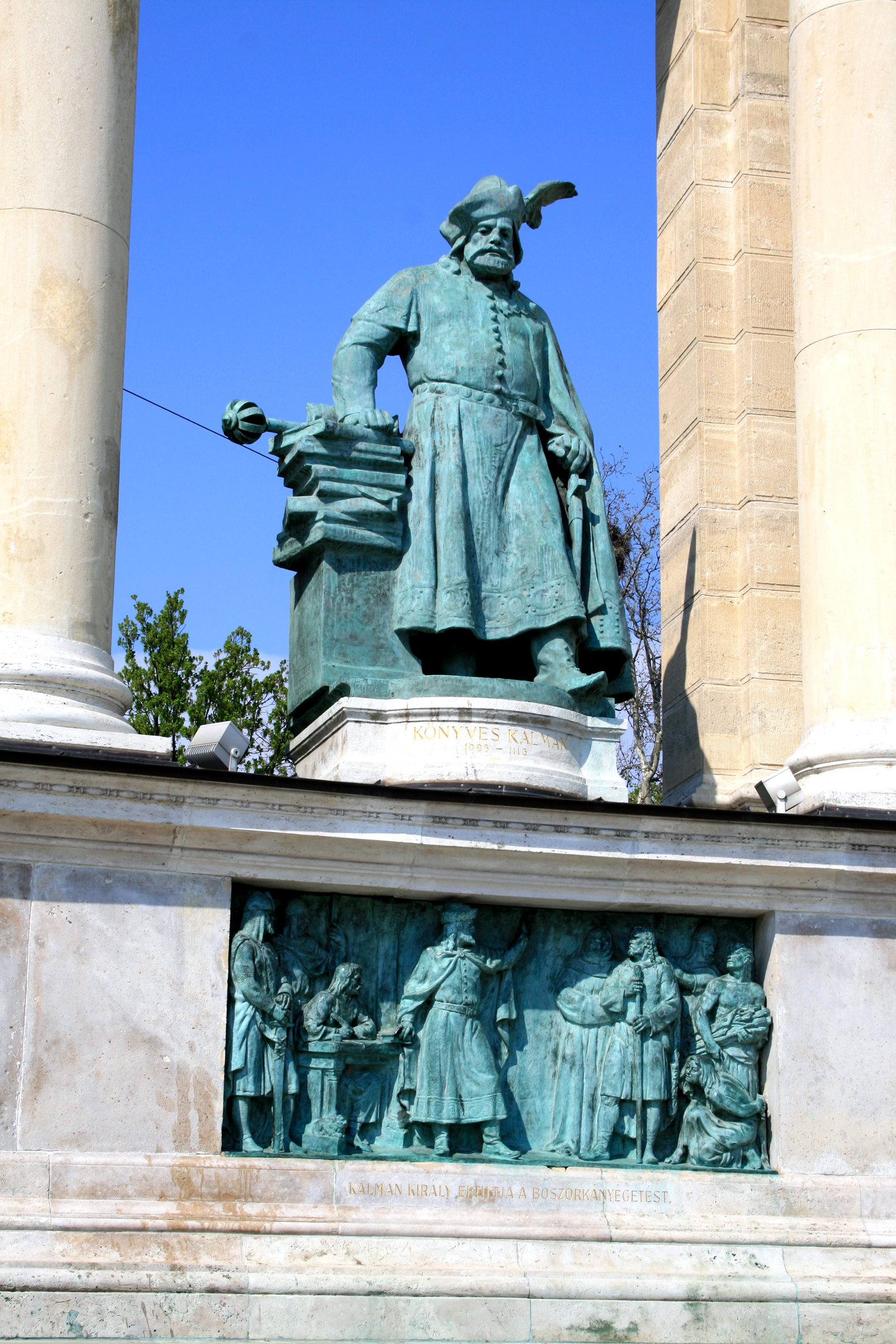
Statue of Coloman, Heroes' Square, Budapest, Hungary

In the spring of 1096, small bands of knights and peasants, inspired by the preaching of the Crusade, set off from various parts of France and Germany (Worms and Cologne). The crusade of the preacher Volkmar, beginning in Saxony, persecuted Jews in Magdeburg and later, on May 30, 1096, in Prague in the Duchy of Bohemia. Cosmas, Bishop of Prague, attempted to prevent forced conversions, and the Catholic hierarchy in Bohemia preached against such acts. Duke Bretislav II was out of the country, and the Catholic Church officials' protests were unable to stop the mob of crusaders.

The hierarchy of the Catholic Church as a whole condemned the persecution of the Jews in the regions affected (though their protests had little effect). Especially vocal were the parish priests (one monk, named Gottschalk, is recorded as joining and encouraging the mob). Chronicler Hugo of Flavigny recorded how these religious appeals were ignored, writing:

It certainly seems amazing that on a single day in many different places, moved in unison by a violent inspiration, such massacres should have taken place, despite their widespread disapproval and their condemnation as contrary to religion. But we know that they could not have been avoided since they occurred in the face of excommunication imposed by numerous clergymen, and of the threat of punishment on the part of many princes.

In general, the Crusader mobs did not fear any retribution, because the local courts did not have the jurisdiction to pursue them past their locality, nor did they have the ability to identify and prosecute individuals out of the mob. The pleas of the clergy were ignored on similar grounds (no cases against individuals were brought forward for excommunication), and the mob believed that anyone preaching mercy to the Jews was doing so only because they had succumbed to Jewish bribery.

The monk Gottschalk went on to lead a crusade from the Rhineland and Lorraine into the Kingdom of Hungary, occasionally attacking Jewish communities along the way. In late June 1096, the crusader mob of Gottschalk was welcomed by King Coloman of Hungary, but they soon began plundering the countryside and causing drunken disorder. Coloman then demanded they disarm. Once their weapons had been secured, the enraged Hungarians fell upon them, and "the whole plain was covered with corpses and blood."

The priest Volkmar and his Saxons also met a similar fate from the Hungarians when they began pillaging villages there because "sedition was incited".

== Emicho ==
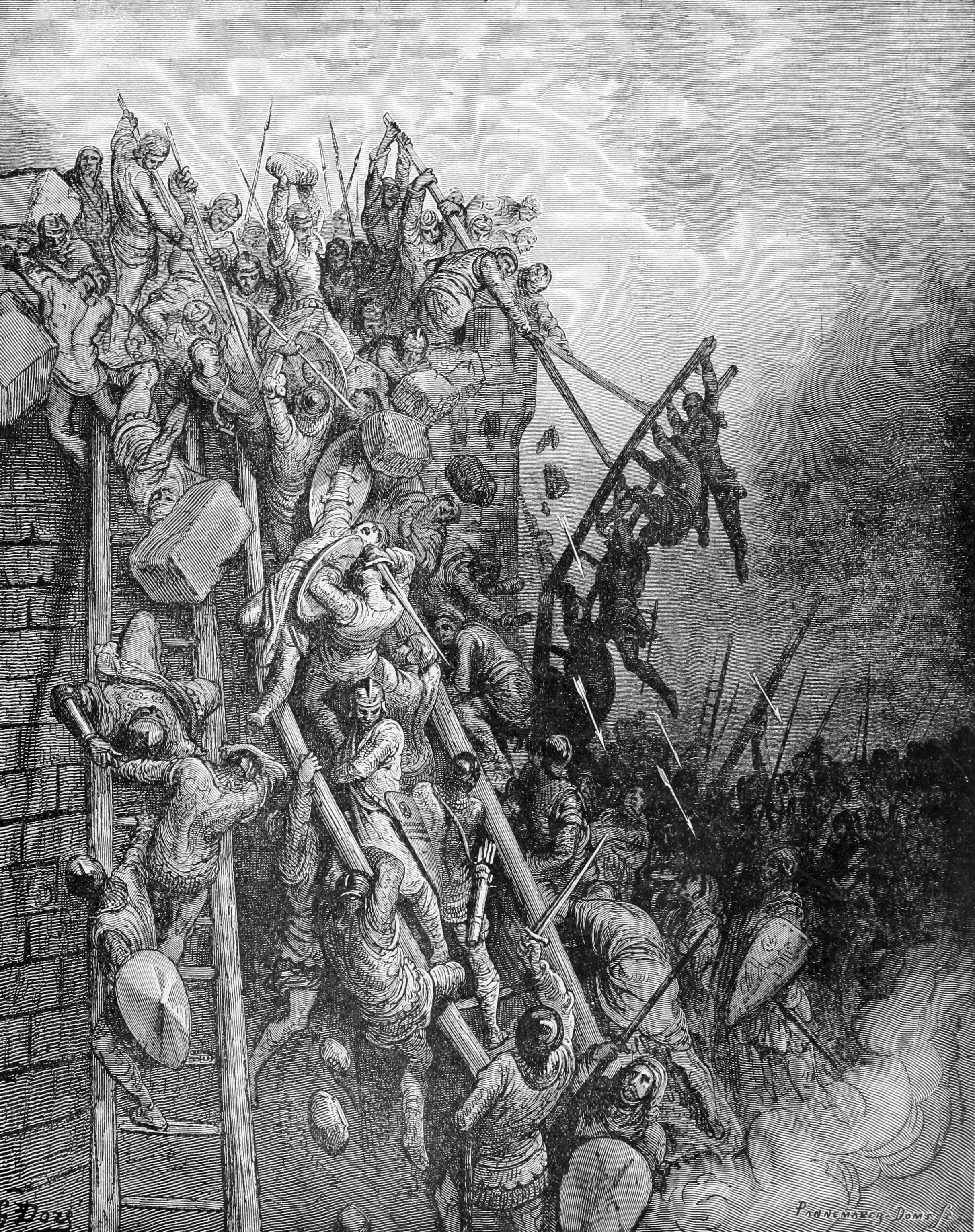
The Army of Priest Volkmar and Count Emicho attacks Mersbourg (Wieselburg, Moson). In the battle, the crusaders are panic-stricken when several ladders collapse under their weight.

The largest of these crusades, and the most involved in attacking Jews, was that led by Count Emicho. Setting off in the early summer of 1096, an army of around 10,000 men, women and children proceeded through the Rhine valley, towards the Main River and then to the Danube. Emicho was joined by William the Carpenter and Drogo of Nesle, among others from the Rhineland, eastern France, Lorraine, Flanders and even England.

Holy Roman Emperor Henry IV, absent in southern Italy, ordered the Jews to be protected when he learned of Emicho's intent. After some Jews were killed at Metz in May, John, Bishop of Speyer gave shelter to the Jewish inhabitants. Still, 12 Jews of Speyer were slain by crusaders on May 3. The bishop of Worms also attempted to shelter Jews, but the crusaders broke into his episcopal palace and killed the Jews inside on May 18. At least 800 Jews were massacred in Worms when they refused Catholic baptism.

News of Emicho's crusade spread quickly, and he was prevented from entering Mainz on May 25 by Bishop Ruthard of Mainz. Emicho took an offering of gold raised by the Jews of Mainz in hope to gain his favor and their safety. Ruthard tried to protect the Jews by hiding them in his lightly fortified palace. Nevertheless, Emicho did not prevent his followers from entering the city on May 27, and a massacre followed. Many among the Christian business class (the burghers) in Mainz had working ties with Jews and gave them shelter from the mobs (as the burghers in Prague had done). The Mainz burghers joined with the militia of the bishop and the burgrave (the town's military governor) in fighting off the first waves of crusaders. This stand had to be abandoned when crusaders continued to arrive in ever greater numbers, and Ruthard and his militia fled and left the Jews to be slaughtered by the crusaders. Despite the example of the burghers, many ordinary citizens in Mainz and other towns were caught up in the frenzy and joined in the persecution and pillaging.

Mainz was the site of the greatest violence, with at least 1,100 Jews being killed by troops under Clarambaud and Thomas. Given the choice between flight, death, and conversion, some Jews opted for a desperate fourth alternative: active martyrdom, that is, killing their family and themselves. One man named Isaac was forcefully converted, but, wracked with guilt, he later killed his family and burned himself alive in his house. A woman Rachel murdered her four children so that they would not be kidnapped and "raised in the way of error" as Christians. Chronicler Solomon bar Simpson compares Rachel to the martyrdom of the woman and her seven sons in an attempt to make sense of her desperate act.

Jewish chronicler Eliezer ben Nathan paraphrased Habakkuk 1:6, writing "cruel foreigners, fierce and swift, Frenchmen and Germans...[who] put crosses on their clothing and were more plentiful than locusts on the face of the earth."

On May 29 Emicho arrived at Cologne, where most Jews had already left or were hiding in Christian houses. In Cologne, other smaller bands of crusaders met Emicho, and they left with quite a lot of money taken from the Jews there. Emicho continued towards Hungary, soon joined by some Swabians. Coloman refused to allow them through Hungary. Count Emicho and his warriors besieged Moson (or Wieselburg), on the Leitha. This led Coloman to prepare to flee into Russia, but the morale of the crusader mob began to fail, which inspired the Hungarians, and most of the mob was slaughtered or drowned in the river. Count Emicho and a few of the leaders escaped into Italy or back to their own homes. William the Carpenter and other survivors eventually joined Hugh of Vermandois and the main body of crusader knights. Holy Roman Emperor Henry IV overruled Church law and permitted forcibly converted Jews to return to Judaism.

== Later attacks on Jews ==
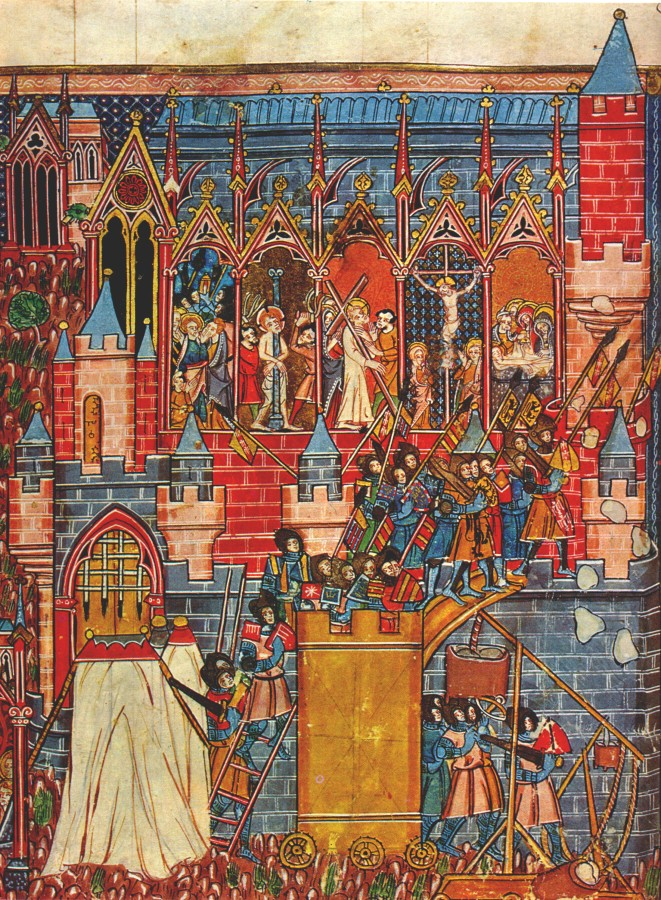
Siege and Capture of Jerusalem, 1099

Later in 1096, Godfrey of Bouillon also collected tribute from the Jews in Mainz and Cologne; he was ordered by Henry IV to abstain from killing the Jews. Saint Louis University Professor Thomas F. Madden, author of A Concise History of the Crusades, claims the Jewish defenders of Jerusalem retreated to their synagogue to "prepare for death" once the crusaders had breached the outer walls of the city during the siege of 1099. The chronicle of ibn al-Qalanisi mentions that the building was set on fire while the Jews were still inside. The crusaders reportedly hoisted their shields and sang the Adoramus te while they circled the burning complex. However, a contemporary Jewish letter written shortly after the siege does not mention the burning synagogue. Playing on the religious schism between the two sects of Judaism, Arabist Shelomo Dov Goitein speculates that the reason the incident is missing from the letter is that it was written by Karaite Jews and the synagogue belonged to Rabbinic Jews.

Following the siege, Jews captured from the Dome of the Rock, along with native Christians, were made to clean the city of the slain. Tancred took some Jews as prisoners of war and deported them to Apulia in southern Italy. Several of these Jews did not make it to their final destination as "Many of them were [...] thrown into the sea or beheaded on the way." Raymond IV, Count of Toulouse held numerous Jews and their holy books, including the Aleppo Codex, for ransom. The Karaite Jewish community of Ashkelon reached out to their coreligionists in Alexandria to first pay for the holy books and then rescue pockets of Jews over several months. All that could be ransomed were liberated by the summer of 1100. The few who could not be rescued were either converted to Catholicism or murdered.

The First Crusade ignited a long tradition of organized violence against Jews in European culture. Jewish money was also used in France for financing the Second Crusade; the Jews were also attacked in many instances, but not on the scale of the attacks of 1096. In England, the Third Crusade was the pretext for the expulsion of the Jews and the confiscation of their money. The two Shepherds' Crusades, in 1251 and 1320, also saw attacks on Jews in France; the 1320 Shepherds' Crusade also attacked and killed Jews in Aragon.

== Catholic Church's response ==
The massacres were condemned by the leaders and officials of the Catholic Church. The Church and its members had previously carried out policies to protect the presence of Jews in Christian culture. For example, the 25 letters regarding the Jews of Pope Gregory I from the late 6th century became the primary texts for the canons, or Church laws, which were implemented to regulate Jewish life in Europe as well as to protect it. These policies did have limits; the Jews were granted protection and the right to their faith if they did not threaten Christianity and remained submissive to Christian rule. These regulations were enacted in a letter by Pope Alexander II in 1063. Their goal was to define the place of the Jews in Christian society. The Dispar nimirum of 1060 is a papal policy concerning the Jews. It rejects acts of violence and punishments of the Jews, and it enforces the idea of protecting the Jews because they were not the enemy of the Christians. The policy aimed to create a balance of privilege and restrictions on Jews so that the Christians did not see their presence as a threat. In 1120 the papal bull Sicut Judaeis was enacted by Pope Calixtus II, which is a more detailed and organized text of the position of the papacy concerning the treatment of Jews. It defines the limits of the Jews' eternal servitude and continues the reinforcement of the Jews' right to their faith.

The bishops of Mainz, Speyer, and Worms had attempted to protect the Jews of those towns within the walls of their palaces. In 1084 Rüdiger Huzmann, Bishop of Speyer, established an area for the Jews to live to protect them from potential violence. Rüdiger's successor, Bishop John, continued the protection of Jews during the First Crusade. During the attack on Speyer, John saved many of the Jews, providing them protection in his castle. Bishop John had the hands of many attackers cut off. Archbishop Ruthard of Mainz tried to save the Jews by gathering them in his courtyard; this was unsuccessful as Emicho and his troops stormed the palace. Ruthard managed to save a small number of Jews by putting them on boats in the Rhine. The Archbishop of Cologne, Hermann III, sent many of the Jews to outlying villages, so that they would be safe from crusaders. The archbishop of Trier was less effective; he favored protecting the Jews from violence, but during the attack on Trier, he hid and did not take any action to help them. Some bishops, like Archbishop Hartwig of Spanheim in Magdeburg, went as far as offering the crusaders silver to spare the Jews. In 1097, Emperor Henry IV granted permission for all Jews who had been forcibly converted during the massacres to return to their Jewish faith.

After the First Crusade, there was a continued effort made by the popes to protect the Jews, so that violence that occurred in the Rhineland Valley would not reoccur. In 1272, Pope Gregory X stated that the Jews "are not capable of harming Christians, nor do they know how to do so." Popes assured the Christian people that the Jews were not the enemy but that the Saracens were because they opposed Christianity, and Jews would only become the enemy if they challenged the religion. Following Gregory X's lead, Pope Benedict XIII clearly stated to the Christian people how to treat the Jews. "Jews are never to be burdened beyond the limits of the present constitution. [They are not] to be molested, to be offered in their persons, or to have their goods seized... [Rather, they are to be treated] humanely and with clemency..." Benedict enforced the privileges given to the Jews by warning the Christians that their actions toward the Jewish people must not violate those given to them by the Church.

Fifty years later, when St. Bernard of Clairvaux was urging recruitment for the Second Crusade, he specifically criticized the attacks on Jews that had occurred in the First Crusade. Though Clairvaux considered the Jews to be "personae non gratae", he condemned in his letters the crusaders' attacks on the Jews and ordered protection for Jewish communities. It has been argued that this was due to Bernard's belief in nonviolence by virtue of the Augustinian doctrine.

== Jewish responses ==
Sigebert of Gembloux wrote that most of those Jews who converted before the crusader threat later returned to Judaism. In some cases, Jews chose to die as Jews rather than convert. The Hebrew chronicles portray the Rhineland Jews as martyrs who willingly sacrificed themselves in order to honor God and preserve their own honor (to die for Kiddush Hashem). The Rhineland Jews looked to historical precedents since Biblical times to justify their actions: the honorable suicide of Saul, the Maccabees revolt against Antiochus IV Epiphanes, the suicide pact at Masada, and the Bar Kochba revolt were seen as justifiable deaths in the face of a stronger enemy.

Despite this, the suicidal and homicidal nature of the Rhineland Jews' actions largely separated the events of 1096 from previous incidents in Jewish history. While the events at Masada most closely parallel the events that occurred during the Rhineland Massacres, the dramatic suicides that were committed during that event were often downplayed by Rabbinic scholars, even to the point of Masada's total omission from some Rabbinic histories.

The Biblical moment that was most commonly evoked by chroniclers of the Rhineland Massacres was the binding of Isaac, to which several allusions appear throughout the major primary sources, the Mainz Anonymous, the Soloman bar Simson Chronicle, and the Eliezer bar Nathan Chronicle (though allusions to this moment persist beyond these sources, and even in to more modern interpretations).

Although it was the most common Biblical reference, the details of the Binding of Isaac presented significant dissimilarities (alongside definite parallels) that put the actions of the Rhineland Jewry at odds with the Biblical narrative. While Isaac was spared from sacrifice by divine intervention, the Jews of the Rhineland committed their ritual suicide to its end. This influenced novel interpretations of the binding of Isaac. The Soloman bar Simson Chronicle interprets the sacrifice of the Rhineland Jews as a similar, though even greater expression of righteousness and piety than that of Abraham, a theme echoed throughout other chronicles of the events. Similarly, a preexisting alternative Midrashic reading of the Binding of Isaac claiming that Isaac truly was sacrificed gained a newfound popularity following the events of 1096.

Several 20th-century Jewish authors have related the events of 1096 to an underlying theme of human sacrifice. Historian Israel Yuval understood these choices as a manifestation of a Messianic theology that was uniquely tied to medieval Jews living in the midst of Latin Christendom. This theology understood the Messiah's coming as a time of vengeance against those who transgressed against God and the Jewish people, as well as a process that was sensitive to the blood of Jewish martyrs. Such ideas are alluded to in the Sefer Hasidim, a work of the twelfth century consisting of an amalgamation of Rabbinic teachings common to the era and the centuries immediately preceding it.

Additionally relevant was a medieval Ashkenazi genealogical interpretation of Christians as descendants of the Biblical Esau (referred to as Edomites), over whom the Jews (the descendants of Jacob) would eventually succeed and gain dominion. Following from this, the events of 1096 presented an opportunity for the Rhineland Jews to ritually offer their deaths as an example of Christian transgression and spur the Messianic Age – an analysis supported by the frequent ritual tone and symbolism employed by Jewish chroniclers while describing the deaths, and their somewhat lesser interest for Jews who simply died by Christian hands directly. This included frequent descriptions of suicides occurring within synagogues (which were on occasion burning), and the shedding of blood on the Holy Ark. Despite this, somewhat more post hoc explanations provided by medieval Jewish chroniclers also existed.

Most often, the homicide of the Rhineland children was explained by the adage "lest they dwell among the Gentiles; it is better that they die innocent and not guilty", meaning that it was better to kill Jewish children and prevent them from losing their religion than to allow them to die later as a non-Jew. The descriptions of Jewish parents killing their children was shocking to Christian ears, and may have served as fuel for later accusations of blood libel.

This analysis of Yuval's caused a stir among the scholarly community, and the journal Zion devoted a double issue to discussing Yuval's thesis. A particularly scathing response was written by Ezra Fleischer, in which he examines of Yuval's claims and responds to them. The article ends with the words "It is the kind of article that would have been better if it had not been written than written, and if it had been written - it would have been better if it had not been printed, and if it had been printed - it would have been better if it had been forgotten as soon as possible".

Historian Jeremy Cohen disagrees with Yuval for a different reason. He argues that Yuval treats the descriptions found in the chronicles of the massacres as if they represent the views of the victims themselves.

In contrast, Cohen contends - and demonstrates through an intertextual literary reading - that these chronicles were written in the early 12th century by the descendants of those who survived the massacres. As such, he claims, they reflect the thoughts and perspectives of the survivors, not of those who gave their lives for kiddush ha-shem.

Historians have disagreed about whether there was a halakhic justification for the mass suicide during the Rhineland massacres. Haym Soloveitchik states that the issue of voluntary martyrdom to avoid committing sins in halakhic literature is highly questionable, and acorrding to that the Poskim should have determined that "all the martyrs [...] were not only not "holy," but were "self-killers," and murderers". Later, according to Soloveitchik, the rabbis, out of respect for the victims, had to justify these horrific acts "with a few deft twists, a tenable, if not quite persuasive" of the Halakha.

In contrast, Avraham Grossman, Israel Ta-Shma and other researchers state that the suicides acted according to the Jewish law as it was known to them. According to them, Ashkenazi Poskim attributed halakhic importance to the legends that appear in the Talmud (Aggadah), many of which involve suicides in order to avoid committing sins. Therefore, the act of suicide during the Rhineland massacres was anchored in the halakhic perception of the Ashkenazim, and they acted according to Jewish tradition, as they perceived it.

Prior to the Crusades, the Jews lived in three major areas which were largely independent of each other. These were the Jews who lived in Islamic nations (still the majority), those who lived in the Byzantine Empire and those who lived in the Catholic West. With the persecutions that began in around 1096, a new sense of awareness about the persecution of the Jewish people as a whole took hold across all of these groups, reuniting the three separate strands.

In the late 19th century, Jewish historians used the episode as a demonstration of the need for Zionism (that is, for a new Jewish state).

== Bibliography ==
=== Primary sources ===
==== Manuscripts ====
- Albert of Aix, Historia Hierosolymitana
- Mainz Anonymous
- Solomon bar Simson Chronicle
- Eliezer bar Nathan Chronicle

=== Primary ===
- Charny, Israel W. (1994). The Widening Circle of Genocide. ISBN 978-1560001720.
- Chazan, Robert (1987). European Jewry and the First Crusade. University of California Press.
- Chazan, Robert (1996). In the Year 1096: The First Crusade and the Jews. Jewish Publication Society. ISBN 978-0827606326.
- Claster, Jill N. (2009). Sacred Violence: The European Crusades to the Middle East, 1095–1396. University of Toronto Press. ISBN 978-1442600607.
- Cohen, Jeremy (2004). Sanctifying The Name of God: Jewish Martyrs and Jewish Memories of the First Crusade. University of Pennsylvania Press.
- Eidelberg, Shlomo (1996). The Jews and the Crusaders. KTAV Publishing House. ISBN 978-0881255416.
- Hoffman, Lawrence A. (1989). Beyond the Text: A Holistic Approach to Liturgy. Indiana University Press. ISBN 978-0253205384.
- Nirenberg, David. "The Rhineland Massacres of Jews in the First Crusade, Memories Medieval and Modern*". Medieval Concepts of the Past: Ritual, Memory, Historiography.
- Reif, Stefan C. (1995). Judaism and Hebrew Prayer. Cambridge University Press. ISBN 978-0521483414.
- Shwartz, Susan (2002). Cross and Crescent. Open Road Integrated Media. ISBN 978-0759212923.
- Tartakoff, Paola (2012). Between Christian and Jew: Conversion and Inquisition in the Crown. University of Pennsylvania Press, Incorporated. ISBN 978-0812244212.
- Tyerman, Christopher (2009). The Crusades. Sterling Publishing Company. ISBN 978-1402768910.
- Vauchez, André; Dobson, Richard Barrie; Lapidge, Michael (2000). Encyclopedia of the Middle Ages. Vol. 1. ISBN 978-1579582821.

=== Secondary sources ===
- Yom Tov Assis; Geremi Cohen; Ora Limor; Aharon Kedar; Michael Toch, eds. (2000). Facing the Cross: The Persecutions of 1096 in History and Historiography (in Hebrew). Jerusalem: The Hebrew University Magnes Press.
- Chazan, Robert (1996). In the Year 1096: The Jews and the First Crusade. Philadelphia: Jewish Publication Society of America. ISBN 978-0827605756.
- Robert Chazan (2000). God, Humanity, and History: The Hebrew First-Crusade Narratives. Berkeley and Los Angeles: University of California Press. ISBN 978-0520221277.
- Cohen, Jeremy. "A 1096 Complex? Constructing the First Crusade in Jewish Historical Memory, Medieval and Modern" (PDF).
- Cohen, Jeremy (2006). Sanctifying the Name of God: Jewish Martyrs and Jewish Memories of the First Crusade. University of Pennsylvania Press.
- Kedar, Benjamin Z. (1998). "Crusade Historians and the Massacres of 1096". Jewish History. 12 (2): 11–31. doi:10.1007/BF02335496. JSTOR 20101340. S2CID 153734729.
- Nirenberg, David. The Rhineland Massacres of Jews in the First Crusade, Memories Medieval and Modern, in Medieval Concepts of the Past: Ritual, Memory. Historiography.
- Otter, Monika (2012). Goscelin of St Bertin. DS Brewer. ISBN 978-1843842941.
- Roth, Norman (January 1994). "Bishops and Jews in the Middle Ages". The Catholic Historical Review. 80 (1): 1–17. JSTOR 25024201.
- Stacey, Robert (1999). Chapter: Crusades, Martyrdoms, and the Jews of Norman England, 1096–1190, Juden und Christen Der Zeit Der Kreuzzüge. Sigmaringen: Jan Thorbecke Verlag. pp. 233–251.
- Stow, Kenneth and David Abulafia (1999). "Ch. 8: The Church and the Jews". The New Cambridge Medieval History. Cambridge: Cambridge University Press. pp. 204–219. doi:10.1017/CHOL9780521362894.012. ISBN 978-1139055734.
- Stow, Kenneth (2007). Popes, Church, and Jews in the Middle Ages: Confrontation and Response. Aldershot: Ashgate. ISBN 978-0754659150.
- Kenneth Setton, ed. (1969–1989). "A History of the Crusades". Madison. Archived from the original on 2003-04-01.
- Vauchez, André; Dobson, Richard Barrie; Lapidge, Michael (2000). Encyclopedia of the Middle Ages. Vol. 1. ISBN 978-1579582821.

=== Journal articles ===
- Eidelberg, Shlomo (1999). "The First Crusade and the persecutions of 1096: a recollection for their 900th anniversary". Medieval Ashkenazic History.
- Eidelberg, Shlomo (1996). "The Jews and the Crusaders: The Hebrew Chronicles of the First and Second Crusades". History. KTAV Publishing House Inc. ISBN 978-0881255416.
- Gabriele, Matthew (2007). Michael Frassetto (ed.). "Against the Enemies of Christ: The Role of Count Emicho in the Anti-Jewish Violence of the First Crusade". Christian Attitudes Towards the Jews in the Middle Ages. Routledge. ISBN 978-0415978279.
- Goitein, G. D. (1952). "Contemporary Letters on the Capture of Jerusalem by the Crusaders". Journal of Jewish Studies. 3 (4): 162–177. doi:10.18647/97/JJS-1952.
- Hacker, Joseph (1966). "On the Persecutions of 1096". Zion (in Hebrew). 31.
- Haverkamp, Eva (2005). "Hebräische Berichte über die Judenverfolgungen während des Ersten Kreuzzugs" [Hebrew reports on the persecution of Jews during the First Crusade]. Monumenta Germaniae Historica: Hebräische Texte aus dem Mittelalterlichen Deutschland (in German). 1. Hanover Hahnsche Buchhandlung.
- Haverkamp, Eva (2008). "What did the Christians know? Latin reports on the persecutions of Jews in 1096". The Journal of the Society for the Study of the Crusades and the Latin East.
- Haverkamp, Eva (2009). "Martyrs in rivalry: the 1096 Jewish martyrs and the Thebean legion". Jewish History. 23 (4): 319–342. doi:10.1007/s10835-009-9091-1. JSTOR 25653802. S2CID 159477788.
- Kober, Adolf (1940). "Cologne". Philadelphia: The Jewish Publication Society of America.
- Malkiel, David (2001). "Destruction or Conversion: Intention and Reaction, Crusaders and Jews, in 1096". Jewish History. 15 (3): 257–280. doi:10.1023/A:1014208904545. JSTOR 20101451. S2CID 156054316.
- Mentgen, Gerd. "Die Juden des Mittelrhein-Mosel-Gebietes im Hochmittelalter unter besonderer Berücksichtigung der Kreuzzugsverfolgungen" [The Jews of the Middle Rhine Moselle area in the High Middle Ages, with special emphasis on crusade persecutions]. Der Erste Kreuzzug 1096 und Seine Folgen, die Verfolgung der Juden Im Rheinland (in German). 9. Evangelical Church in the Rhineland, Düsseldorf 1996 (Schriften des Archivs der Evangelischen Kirche im Rheinland.
- "Die Juden des Mittelrhein-Mosel-Gebietes im Hochmittelalter unter besonderer Berücksichtigung der Kreuzzugsverfolgungen [The Jews of the Middle Rhine Moselle area in the High Middle Ages, with special emphasis on crusade persecutions]". Monatshefte für Evangelische Kirchengeschichte des Rheinlandes. 44. 1995.
