= Emicho (crusader) =

11th-century German nobleman

Emicho was a count in the Rhineland in the late 11th century. He is also commonly referred to as Emich of Flonheim, and not to be confused with Bishop Embricho of Würzburg, often mistakenly called Embricho of Leiningen. The Count Emicho from the Hebrew Chronicles was the Count of Flonheim. He is often mistaken for Count Emicho of Leiningen, who was not involved in any of the Crusades but did in fact live during this time period. In 1096, he was the leader of the Rhineland massacres (sometimes referred to as the "German Crusade of 1096") which were a series of mass murders of Jews that took place during the People's Crusade.

== First Crusade ==
The original idea for the First Crusade that had been preached by Pope Urban II at the Council of Clermont in 1095 had already turned into a much different popular movement, the People's Crusade, led by Peter the Hermit. Peter's preaching of the Crusade spread much more quickly than the official versions of Urban's call. Peter's version influenced Emicho, who spread his own story that Christ had appeared to him. Infused with the teachings of the Gospel of Luke he felt chosen to fulfill the "end of times" prophecy. Emicho envisioned that he would march on Constantinople and overcome the forces there, taking over the title of "last World Emperor" in accordance with canonical prophetic tradition. All Christian armies, Latin and Greek, would then unite and march to seize Jerusalem from the Saracens thus prompting the Second Coming and denouement with the Antichrist. Inspired by such exulting promises, a few thousand Franks and Germans merged and marched east in April 1096.

=== Followers ===
Emicho's army attracted many unusual followers, including a group who worshipped a goose they believed to be filled with the Holy Spirit (see Women in the Crusades). The army included noblemen and knights such as Drogo Count of Nesle, Hartmann I, Count of Dillingen-Kyburg, Thomas, Lord of Marle and La Fère and Count of Amien, and William the Carpenter, Viscount of Milun. This contradicts the often repeated narrative that Emicho's army was mostly composed of peasants and burghers who were ignorant and instinctively prejudiced against Jews, mostly for economic reasons. Instead, there were a number of relatively educated and wealthy men, likely accompanied by clerics, in Emicho's army who would have known that forced conversions were forbidden according to the tenets of the Church. The violence of the Rhineland massacres cannot be explained away under the assumption that the army was mostly composed of ignorant and provincial peasants.

=== Rhineland massacres ===
Count Emicho's precise role in the Rhineland Massacres, the series of violent attacks and forced conversions of the Rhineland's Jews just prior to the First Crusade, has been the subject of significant debate. There were many crusading forces moving through the Rhineland, but most were interested primarily in reaching the Holy Land. For instance, when Peter the Hermit and his mob of Crusaders passed through these towns and threatened the Jewish population, they had been amenable to bribes and largely left the Jews free from harassment. Although Emicho has frequently been referenced in secondary and tertiary sources as having been present during the massacres of Jews in Cologne and Worms, there is sparse evidence in the primary accounts to support his involvement. Indeed, the only massacre in which Emicho definitively participated was that in Mainz. The Jewish writer of the account known as the Mainz Anonymous mentions Emicho as having been in the rough vicinity of Speyer during the massacre there, but clearly notes he did not participate in the violence.

Yet Emicho certainly led the forces that massacred the Jews of Mainz, one of the largest European Jewish communities at the time, in May 1096. The Jews within the city were well-aware of the earlier massacres and forced conversions in other Rhineland cities and feared the worst. They appealed to the Archbishop Ruthard and the area's lay lords to protect them from the approaching mob, offering money and valuable possessions to further encourage the lords. In an attempt to deter the approaching crusaders, Ruthard closed the city's gates and attempted to hide Jews in his palace. Ultimately, however, the city gates were opened by sympathetic burghers within Mainz and the Jews were attacked despite the archbishop's best attempts to protect them.

Part of what distinguished Emicho and his army from other crusading armies that crossed the Rhineland was their unwillingness to be swayed from committing violence by bribes. Greed was clearly not their sole motivation, contrary to many cursory accounts of Emicho. While money was likely necessary to fund their pilgrimage to reach the Holy Land, the Crusaders could have easily taken the possessions and money offered to them by the Jews and continued on their way without a significant amount of violence. Yet, they chose to kill the majority of the Jews they encountered, even women and children whom they could have compelled to convert. Emicho and his men went to great lengths to hunt down and kill every refugee they could find in Mainz; they intended to inflict maximal damage. This is exemplified by the Mainz Anonymous's description of Emicho:

He was our chief persecutor. He had no mercy on the elderly, on young men and young women, on infants or sucklings, nor on the ill. He made the people of the Lord like dust to be trampled. Their young men he put to the sword, and their pregnant women he ripped open.

This ideologically based hatred of Jews, along with the far higher death count, is what made the massacre in Mainz distinct from previous attacks in the Rhineland. The motivations behind this hatred are yet another source of contention by historians. Certain historians have characterized these sentiments as part of the broader context of apocalyptic mythology, with the Crusaders anticipating an imminent end of the world, a "zero-sum game between good and evil”. This end of days would be precipitated by Christian control of the Holy Land and mass conversions of Jews to Christianity. For the end of time to occur, Jews had to either die or abandon Judaism and embrace Christianity. Others see instead this animosity as emerging from the crusade to the Holy Land itself. With the shrines of Christendom being discussed, and the destination being Jerusalem and the Holy Sepulchre, Christ's burial place, the role Jews played in Christ's crucifixion must have been in the forefront of many crusaders' minds. This attitude is illustrated by a crusader's supposed remark to a Jew as written by the chronicler Bar-Simson: "You are the children of those who killed the object of our veneration, hanging him on a tree. And he himself had said, 'there will yet come a day when my children will come and avenge my blood.' We are his children and it is, therefore, our duty to avenge him against you who disbelieve in him."

Beneath either motivation behind massacring the Rhineland's Jews is the reality that Jews in 1096 were alienated from their Christian neighbors. Jews and Muslims were scarcely distinguished in the eleventh century as both were seen as agents of the devil and in league with one another, plotting against Christendom. Thus, it is not surprising that a crusade ostensibly directed against one group could be seamlessly redirected against the other. Especially in the apocalyptic mindset, both Jews and Muslims had to be destroyed or converted for the Earth to reach the end of days.

=== Disintegration of Emicho's army ===
The army continued down the Rhine until they reached the Danube, which they followed to Hungary. Here, after having run out of money and food, they began to pillage. Much of the army was killed by the Hungarians; the rest split up to join the other Crusader armies, and Emicho went back home to his family, where he was scorned for not fulfilling his vow to capture Jerusalem.

== Legacy ==
Count Emicho was said to be influenced into action by a divine vision. In the vision an apostle is giving Emicho a crown in "Italian Greece" and promising him "victory over his foes". This vision is a grave reference to the "Last Roman Emperor", which is the legend of a man surrendering his "earthly power to God" and being given the power to destroy the enemies of Christians, mercilessly. In the legend the purpose of the "Last Roman Emperor" is to restore God's power in the Holy Land. To restore God's power the chosen one, the one granted the vision, is expected to kill or convert those who oppose Christianity. By having such a divine vision, those who knew of Count Emicho and believed in his vision interpreted him as the main leader of the Rhineland Massacres.

Chroniclers, such as Ekkehard, saw Count Emicho's vision as his rebirth. Ekkehard was a monk of Aura who later joined a Crusading army in 1100. Ekkehard, in his account, noted Count Emicho as a person who was once tyrannical, but was "called by a divine revelation, like another Saul". Nevertheless, in medieval political thought, Saul was a complex character that was often employed in discussions of the nature of lay authority, and its derivation from the Church. In short, medieval churchmen often evoked Saul's contest with Samuel – and used Samuel to support their position that lay authority was dependant on legitimacy granted by the Church, rather than the other way around. Considering Ekkehard's support for the reform movement, and his position regarding the Investiture Controversy, a comparison to Saul may not be an entirely positive one.

The account of Albert of Aachen places Count Emicho as the main leader of the Rhineland Massacre by using diction such as "Emicho and the rest of his band". Emicho's vision played an important role to his ability to be a leader during the Rhineland Massacre. He was qualified to lead the crusading army because his vision was interpreted as God placing him in the role of power. Even after his death, there were accounts stating the myth that Emicho's soul was guarding the gate of Rhineland.

Count Emicho has been viewed as both a person who took part in the Rhineland Massacres as a soldier as well as the person who is directly responsible for the actions committed in the Rhineland. His documented involvement in the massacres could be attributed to the legend of the Last Roman Emperor.

== In popular culture ==
- Horrible Histories, Season 4, Episode 3

== See also ==
- Emichones
- House of Leiningen

== Sources ==
- Toussaint, Ingo: Die Grafen von Leiningen. Jan Thorbecke Verlag, Sigmaringen 1982. ISBN 3-7995-7017-9.
- "A Database of Crusaders to the Holy Land", 1095–1149 (archive).
