= Elijah ben Mordecai =

Elijah ben Mordecai (Hebrew: אליהו בן מרדכי, romanized: Eliyahu ben Mordekhai) was an 11th-century payyeṭan, possibly a native of Italy. Of his poetic productions a ḳerovah for the Minḥah of Yom Kippur (אֵיתָן הִכִּיר אֱמוּנָתֶךָ) is found in the German-Polish liturgy. Eliezer ben Nathan wrote a commentary on Elijah's piyyuṭim.
