= Mark Sargent (flat Earth proponent) =

American promoter of the flat Earth conspiracy theory

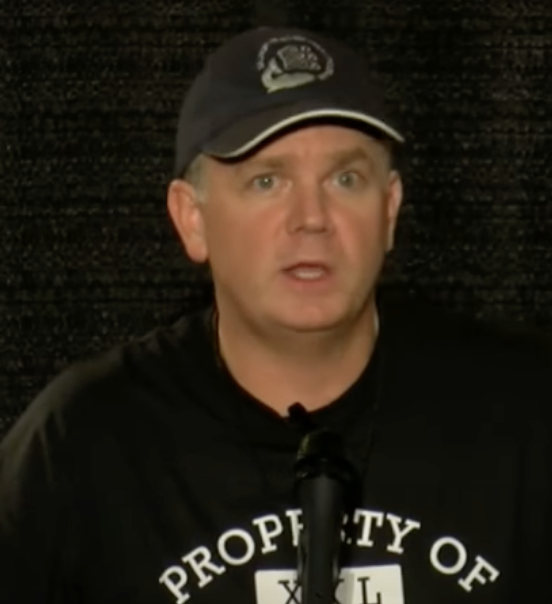
- Sargent speaking at a Flat Earth conference in 2017
- Born: c.1968 (age 57–58); Whidbey Island, Washington, U.S.
- Occupation: YouTuber
- Years active: Since 2015

Mark Kendall Sargent (born c. 1968) is an American conspiracy theorist, who is one of the leading proponents of, and recruiters for, the discredited flat Earth conspiracy theory in the United States. According to critics, his YouTube videos have greatly accelerated the popularization of modern flat Earth belief, one without scientific merit.

== Early life ==
Mark Sargent was born and raised on the South End of Whidbey Island, Washington. After graduating high school, he attended Western Washington University in Bellingham, Washington for three years before he was "kicked out" for manufacturing and selling illegal fireworks. In the 1994, he won a Crystal Caliburn video pinball game competition and was hired to test other video games for its publisher, StarPlay Productions, in Colorado. He then worked at other local software companies training people in proprietary software until 2014. He has no formal education in computer science, physical science, or natural science. In 2015, he posted “Flat Earth Clues” on YouTube and was invited by Truth Frequency Radio based in Denver to host a weekly radio show, “Strange World”. In 2017 he moved back to Whidbey Island where he currently resides.

== Flat Earth beliefs and influence ==
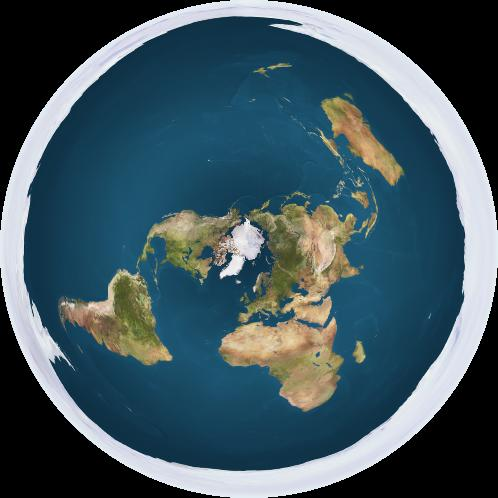
A model of the Earth as a disk, similar to what Sargent promotes

In 2015, Sargent released a series of videos he created on YouTube called Flat Earth Clues, which questioned the accepted shape of the Earth. The series attracted two million views, propelling the rise of the modern flat Earth movement.

Sargent works to convince others that the Earth is a flat disk, with a giant wall of ice around the circumference. An indestructible dome is claimed to be attached to the rim, making it a closed system. He claims that stars and planets are not physical places but simply lights attached to the dome. Sargent states that all world governments have been lying about the shape of the planet, and that NASA faked the Apollo program as well as all other space exploration programs.

An article in The New Yorker explained how Sargent's video series was instrumental in converting people to his viewpoint. It reported that Darryle Marble, who would later be a featured speaker at the first-ever Flat Earth Conference:

...found the light in his YouTube sidebar. While looking for videos related to Under the Dome, a TV sci-fi drama, he came across "Under the Dome", a two-hour film, which takes the form of a documentary, by Mark K. Sargent, one of the leading flat-Earth proselytizers. The flat-Earth movement had burbled along in relative darkness until February of 2015, when Sargent uploaded "Flat Earth Clues", a series of well-produced videos...

Sargent says that being single was a contributing factor to his discovering and believing in the flat Earth conspiracy. He said, "Most people get married and have kids. But if you don't, you have a huge amount of free time on your hands". According to Sargent in an interview with the Los Angeles Times, as of 2018 his YouTube channel had accumulated ten million views and he had become a full-time YouTuber. According to Sargent at a flat Earth conference in Canada in August 2018, his path towards believing in the flat Earth theory was paved by a failed attempt by him to debunk a flat Earth video which he first saw in the summer of 2014.

Sargent has been a speaker at numerous flat Earth events in the United States, Canada and New Zealand. He describes himself as a recruiter for the movement, and has been called its main organizer by media including the Los Angeles Times. He was extensively interviewed for the 2018 documentary Behind the Curve, a Netflix documentary about the flat Earth community. He also expounded on his views in a self-published book titled Flat Earth Clues: The Sky's The Limit in 2016.

Critics consider the flat Earth beliefs promoted by Sargent pseudoscience, inconsistent with all empirical evidence. They have been attributed to "conspiracy mentality", reliance on religious belief, distrust of authority, science denial, or a fallacious, although pro-science, interpretation of the scientific method.

Sargent also incorporates other conspiracy theories into his flat Earth beliefs, accusing astronauts of being Freemasons. Sargent also believes Bigfoot exists.

== Bibliography ==
- Flat Earth Clues: The Sky's The Limit (2016)
- Flat Earth Clues: End of The World (2019)

== See also ==
- Figure of the Earth
- Geodesy
- Hollow Earth
- Modern flat Earth beliefs § Effects of and empirical evidence for spherical shape, documenting why the flat Earth belief is mistaken
