= Siege of Tudela =

- Part of the Reconquista
Date	1087
Location	Tudela, Navarre, Spain 42°03′55″N 1°36′24″W
Result	Zaragozan victory

Belligerents
León–Castile and allies	Taifa of Zaragoza
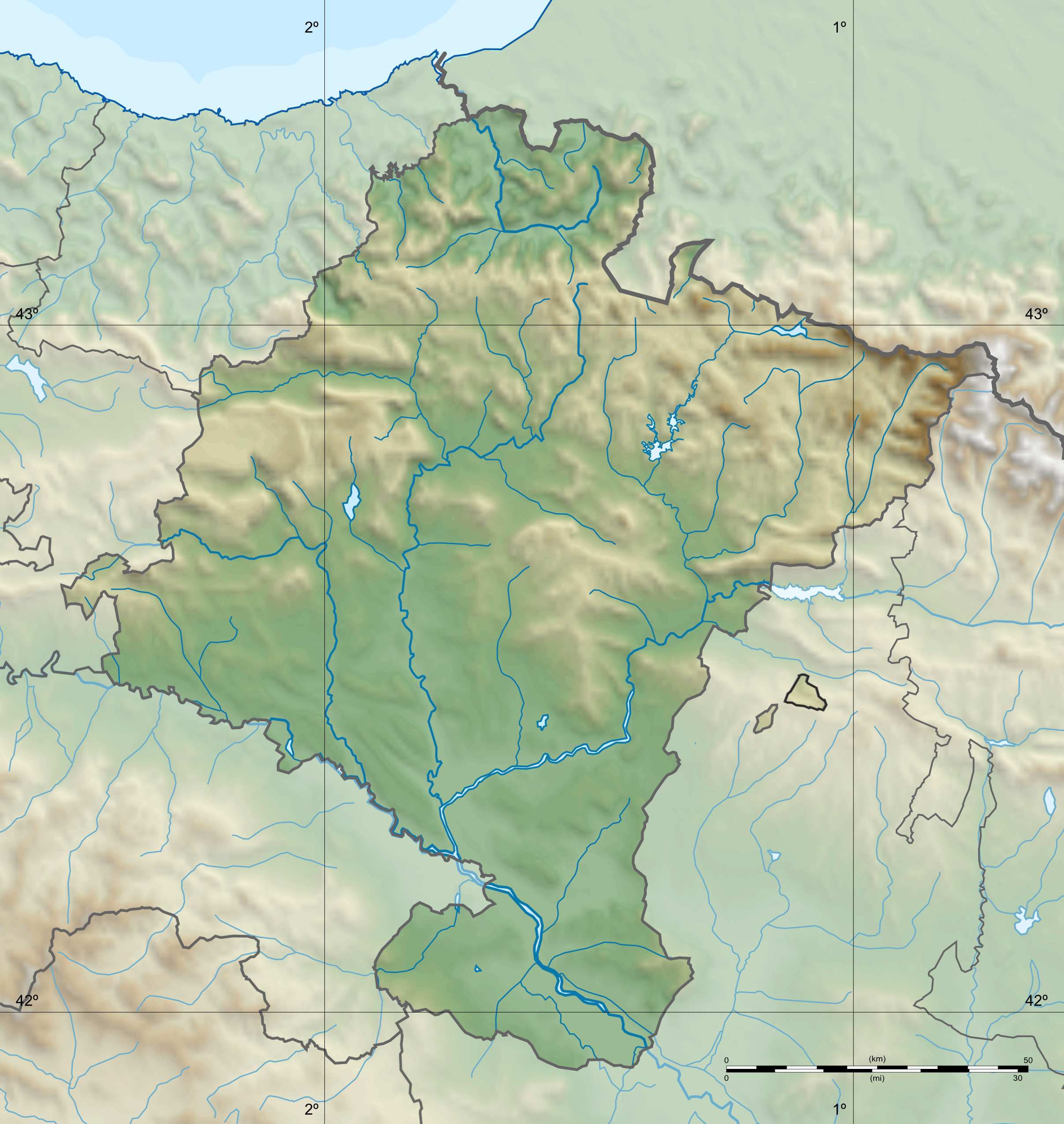
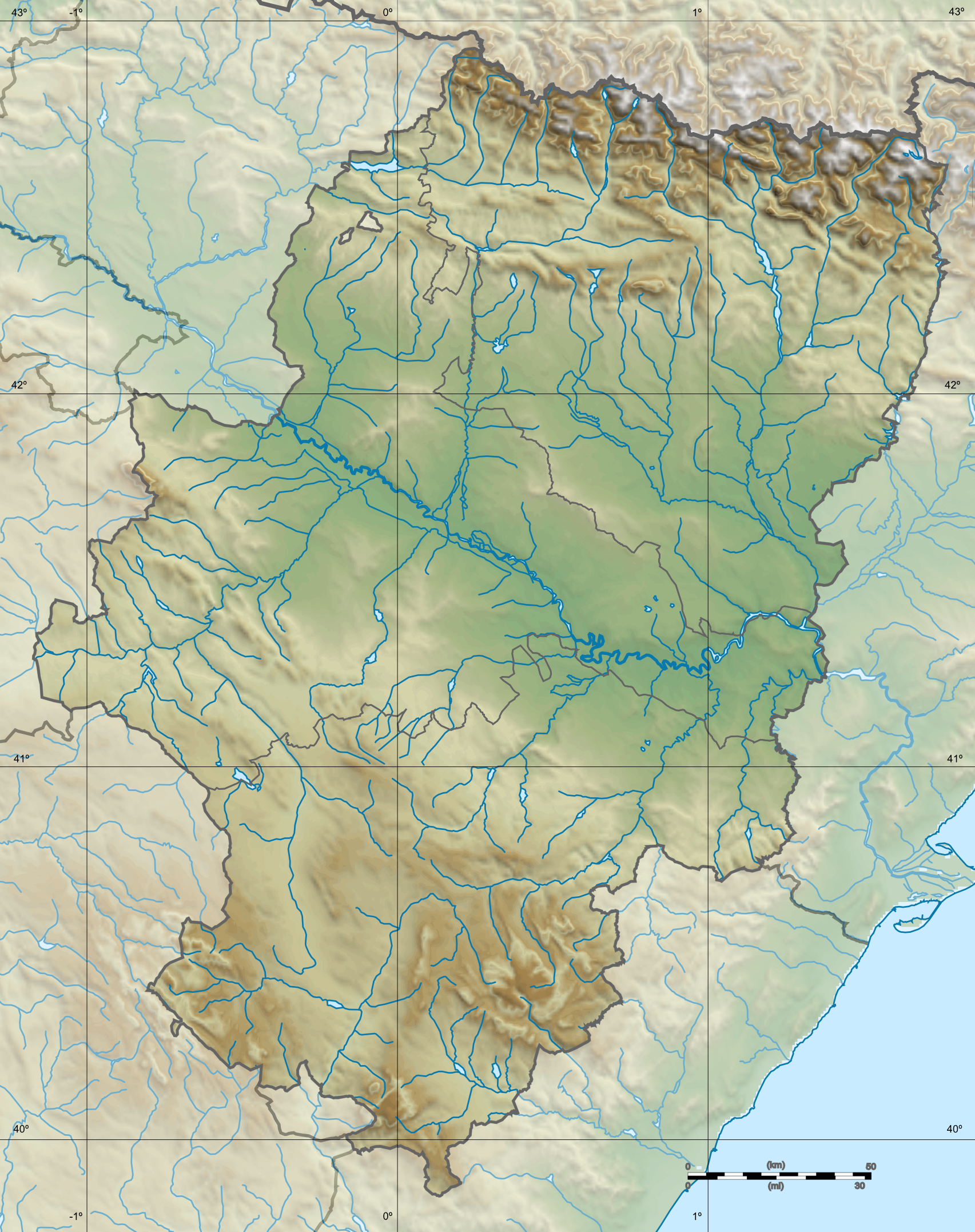
- Location within Navarre Siege of Tudela (Aragon) Siege of Tudela (Spain)

The siege of Tudela was the main action of the French military campaign in Spain in 1087 in conjunction with Kings Alfonso VI of León and Castile and Sancho V of Navarre and Aragon. The arrival of a French army under Odo I, Duke of Burgundy, and William, Viscount of Melun, early in the spring of 1087 was a response to Alfonso's plea for military aid, which was generated by the offensive of the Almoravids on Iberia. After defeating Alfonso at the Battle of Sagrajas on 23 October 1086, the Almoravids retreated before the French could arrive. Alfonso then convinced his allies to direct their energies at Tudela, the northernmost fortress of the taifa of Zaragoza. The issue of the siege is unclear: Reilly considers it to have been a failure, while Petit reports that the city was captured, if only temporarily, as it would have been definitely reconquered by Alfonso I of Aragon in 1119. At any rate, several important negotiations took place there among the besieging parties, leading to the appointment of Raymond of Burgundy as the second most important man in the kingdom of León and Castile.
