= Eliezer ben Nathan =

French Tosafist

- רבי אליעזר בן נתן
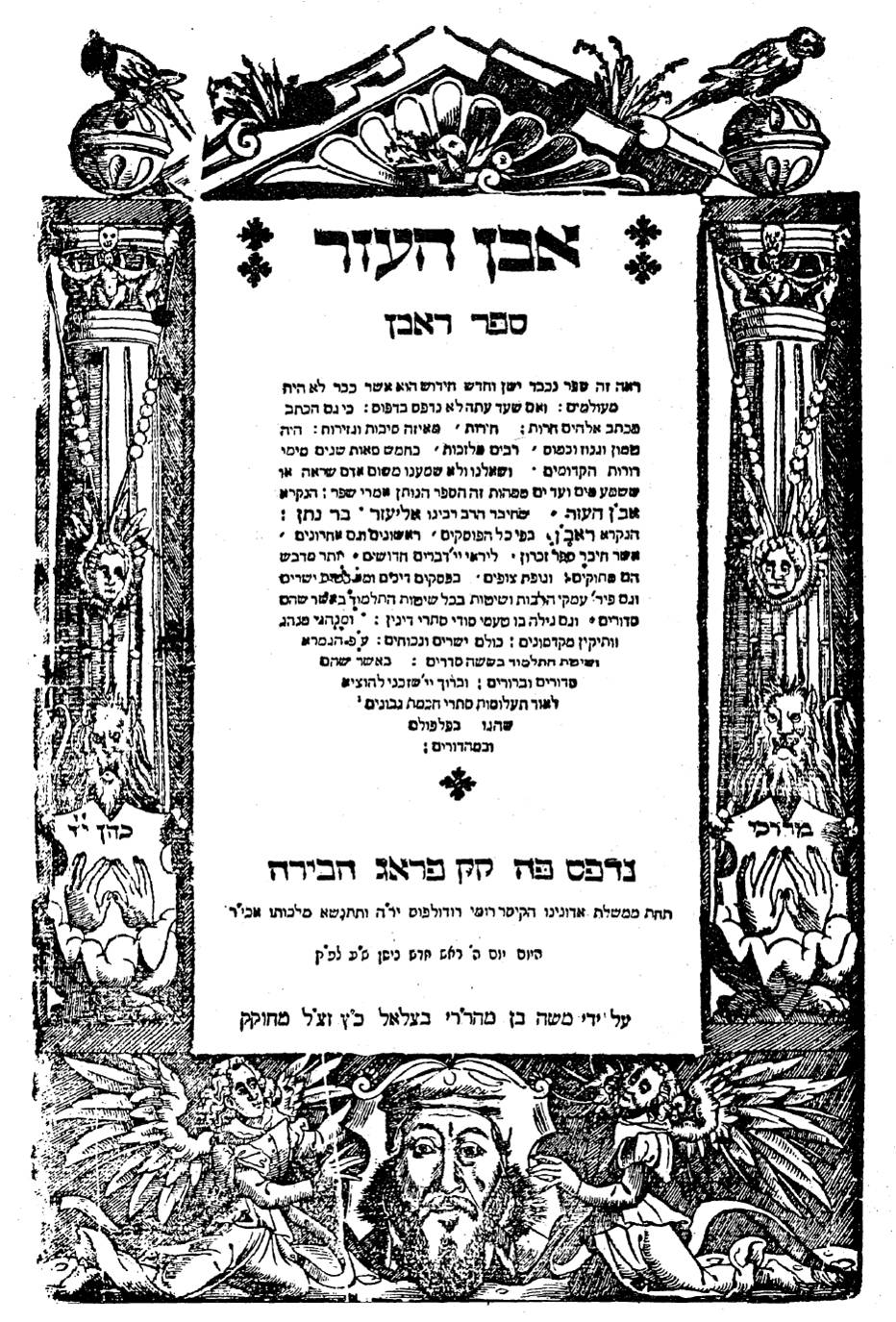
- Title page of the Prague (1610) first edition.
- Born: 1090
- Died: 1170 (aged 79–80)
- Other name: הראב״ן

Eliezer ben Nathan (Hebrew: אליעזר בן נתן) of Mainz (1090–1170), or Ra'avan (ראב״ן), was a halakist and liturgical poet. As an early Rishon, he was a contemporary of the Rashbam and Rabbeinu Tam, and one of the earliest of the Tosafists. He was the son-in-law of Eliakim b. Joseph of Mainz, a fellow student of Rashi. Through his four daughters Eliezer became the ancestor of several learned families which exerted a great influence upon religious life in the subsequent centuries. One of his great-grandsons was R. Asher ben Jehiel (Rosh), father of R. Jacob, author of the Ṭurim.

In or around 1160, a synod was held in Troyes as part of the Takkanot Shum. This synod was led by Rabbeinu Tam, his brother, Rashbam, and Ra'avan. Over 250 rabbis from communities all over France attended as well. A number of communal decrees were enacted at the synod covering both Jewish-Gentile relations as well as matters relating internally to the Jewish community.

== Even haEzer ==
Even haEzer is a collection of responsa, found in two sections at the beginning and end of the work, and legal decisions, arranged in the middle as a commentary to the Babylonian Talmud. This book, which Eliezer compiled from smaller topical pamphlets, was also known as Tzaf'nat Paneah in the medieval period and continues to be called Sefer Ra'avan. Eliezer introduces the work as follows:

I called this book Even haEzer (1Sam 7:12; lit. "stone of the help") because my Rock helped me to uncover the purposes of our ancient practices, and the deep secrets of both our monetary and our ritual law, and the legal books of Moed, Nezikin, and Nashim, which future generations will need to understand.

Eliezer proves himself conscientious and careful in his decisions, and in his reverence for tradition he is inclined to accept extremely rigid interpretations of the Law. He interprets the Biblical injunction "Forsake not the teaching of thy mother," as meaning, "What the older rabbis have prohibited we must not permit" (No. 10). The chapters on civil law contain many an interesting document, and also a statement of commercial relations occasioned by various trials. They contain precise statements of the prices of goods and accurate information concerning commercial usages in the Rhineland and in distant Slavic countries; e.g., concerning the golden trade routes in Strasburg and Speyer (fol. 145b); the coinage of the time; and the export trade with Galicia and southern Russia (No. 5). Slavic customs and character are also discussed in connection with ritual matters. Among the decisions are some containing interpretations of Biblical and Talmudic sayings; one of them (No. 119) even presenting a connected commentary on Proverbs 30:1-6, in which Saadia Gaon's view is cited—namely, that Isthiel and Ucal were the names of two men who addressed philosophical questions to Agur ben Jakeh.

The work mentions the year 1152, and must therefore have been completed after that date. The year 1247, which occurs in the Prague edition, was the insertion of a later copyist. In the subsequent centuries Eliezer came to be regarded as a great authority, but his work was little known. Not until its importance had been specially urged by the most influential rabbis of Poland—Mordecai Jafe, Samuel Eliezer Edels (Maharsha), Solomon Ephraim Luntschitz, among others, in a formal appeal issued from Posen in 1609—was its publication undertaken. The book survives completely in only one manuscript (MS HAB Guelf. 5.7).

== As liturgical poet ==
Eliezer wrote numerous yoẓerot, seliḥot, and other piyyuṭim; very few of them, however, have been incorporated in the German and Polish liturgy. The Akapperah Pene Melek in the seliḥot to the musaf of the Day of Atonement is an example. His poetical productions are valuable only as an index to his devout nature and to his estimate of the importance of the liturgy. They are distinguished for neither originality, elevation of thought, nor elegance of diction. With their allusions to haggadic interpretations, their employment of payyeṭan phraseology, acrostics, rimes, and similar mechanical devices, they differ little from many other liturgical productions. Some of these poems he seems to have written on special occasions. Thus, one piyyuṭ composed for a circumcision occurring on the Sabbath bears at the close the cipher "ABN," and the words "Long live my child Eliakim." Altogether twenty-five piyyuṭim of his are known. One of his seliḥot depicts the persecutions of the First Crusade (1096); another, those of 1146.

== As commentator ==
To Eliezer is attributed the commentary on the Maḥzor published in Ostroh in 1830. Some of Eliezer's expositions are mentioned in a commentary on the festal prayers called Ḳorban Aharon. Mention is also made of a commentary on Abot, from which Jehiel Morawtschik, in his Minḥah Ḥadashah, written in 1576 after a manuscript of the year 1145, makes quotations.

== As chronicler: persecution of 1096 ==
Eliezer is also the author of a history of the terrible events of 1096, the year of the Rhineland massacres, part of the People's Crusade. It expressed great antipathy towards the Christian crusaders, and wrestled with the matter of why God would allow so many Jews to be massacred. The persecutions of the Jewish communities in the towns along the Rhine, the horrible butcheries that were perpetrated, are faithfully depicted here in chronological order.

In this work various acrostic verses contain the name "Eliezer b. Nathan." In deference to a passage in Joseph ha-Kohen's Emek haBacha, p. 31, which makes a certain Eleazar ha-Levi the author, some writers (as Landshuth and H. Grätz) have denied Eliezer's authorship of this chronicle. This view, however, was refuted around 1900. The chronicle was first edited by Adolph Jellinek; and was republished as Hebräische Berichte über die Judenverfolgungen Während der Kreuzzüge, by A. Neubauer and Stern, together with a German translation.

== See also ==
- Mainz Anonymous and Solomon bar Simson Chronicle

== Sources ==
It has the following bibliography:

- Leser Landshuth, 'Ammude ha-'Abodah, pp. 20–22;
- Heimann, Michael Joseph (1891). Or ha-Ḥayyim. Frankfort-on-the-Main. pp. 211–215;
- Moritz Güdemann, Gesch. des Erziehunqswesen und der Cultur, i., passim;
- Zunz, Literaturgesch. pp. 259–262;
- Gross, in Monatsschrift, 1885, p. 310;
- H. Bresslau, in Neubauer and Stern, Quellen, ii., xv.-xvii.L
