= Solomon bar Simson Chronicle =

Medieval Hebrew text

The Solomon bar Simson Chronicle is an anonymous Hebrew narrative history produced in the mid-12th century (1140). Like the Eliezer bar Nathan Chronicle and the Mainz Anonymous, it is concerned with the persecutions of Jewish communities in the Rhineland area, notably Speyer, Worms, Mainz and Trier, during the First Crusade (1095-1099).

The text comes down to us in a manuscript of the 15th century, which was discovered only in the late 19th century. The transmitted text is complete, but marred by many scribal errors. A passage in the section on the Jewry in Cologne provides a date of 1140 for at least that part in which it occurs.

== Contents and themes ==
The history focuses primarily on the Jewish martyrs of the persecutions. Anecdotal accounts were included to commemorate the martyrs, some of whom responded in extraordinarily radical fashion to the violence that awaited them. A Jew from Worms named Meshullam ben Isaac, for instance, is said to have sacrificed his son Isaac, killed his wife Zipporeh and finally to have committed suicide in order that their deaths will not come about at the hands of the Crusaders. The narrator comments that through his deed, Meshullam ben Isaac surpassed the patriarch Abraham.

== See also ==
- Rhineland massacres

== Secondary sources ==
- Chazan, Robert. God, Humanity, and History: The Hebrew First Crusade Narratives. Berkeley and London: University of California Press, 2000. ISBN 978-0-520-22127-7.
- Eidelberg, Shlomo (1996). "The Jews and the Crusaders: The Hebrew Chronicles of the First and Second Crusades". History. KTAV Publishing House Inc. ISBN 978-0881255416.
