= Behind the Curve =

2018 American documentary film by Daniel J. Clark

- Promotional release poster
- Directed by: Daniel J. Clark
- Produced by: Caroline Clark; Nick Andert; Daniel J. Clark
- Starring: Mark Sargent; Patricia Steere
- Edited by: Nick Andert
- Music by: Bryan Ricker
- Production company: Delta-v Productions
- Release date: November 15, 2018
- Running time: 95 minutes
- Country: United States
- Language: English

Behind the Curve is a 2018 documentary film about flat Earth believers in the United States. Directed by Daniel J. Clark, the film was released in the United States on November 15, 2018, and for wide release on Netflix in February 2019.

The documentary details ideas of the flat Earth from different perspectives, including prominent flat-Earthers Mark Sargent and Patricia Steere, as well as astrophysicists from universities including UCLA and Caltech. It features clips from the 2017 International Flat Earth Conference, held in North Carolina, US, which attracted hundreds of attendees from around the globe (sic).

== Synopsis ==
Behind the Curve primarily focuses on flat Earth proponent Mark Sargent, and his life as an active member of the flat Earth community. Sargent discusses his interpretation of flat Earth theory, and his role as an advocate, as well as his series of YouTube videos and podcasts. It also follows Sargent as he attends various flat Earth gatherings. Other flat Earth believers featured include Patricia Steere, creator of the podcast Flat Earth and Other Hot Potatoes; Eric Dubay, and Jeran Campanella and Bob Knodel, creators of the GlobeBusters YouTube channel.

Professionals in the scientific community, including astronaut Scott Kelly, are interviewed about their views on the flat Earth conspiracy theory, and to discuss the current scientific views on conspiracy theories and the possible consequences of a lack of critical thinking in society.

In the film, flat Earth advocates carry out experiments to test the hypothesis that the Earth is flat, the results of which confirm that the Earth is a globe, and so are discarded. The film also covers several conferences and meet-ups that the film's subjects attend, including the 2017 International Flat Earth Conference, held in Raleigh, North Carolina.

== Production ==
When director Clark was asked in an interview about lessons from the film he said, "My dream would be that when people watch it, they take flat Eartherism as an analogy to something they believe in, because it's so easy to demonize another group or another person for something they think, but you're kind of just as guilty if you do that."

== Release ==
Behind the Curve was first released at Hot Docs Canadian International Documentary Festival, Toronto, Canada, on April 30, 2018. It has since been screened at various film festivals around the world.

== Reception ==
The film has received positive reviews from critics. On review aggregator Rotten Tomatoes, the documentary holds a 91% approval rating based on eleven reviews, with an average rating of 7.30/10.

Reviews described the film as "hilarious, informative, but pressing" and "empathetic", with several commentators praising its "humanistic look at some of the most ridiculed people in America".

After the release of the film, Sargent and Steere both claimed their fanbase has grown considerably.
