= Drogo of Nesle =

Knight

- Occupation: Knight
- Known for: Survived the violent dispersal of the army led by Emicho, Count of Flonheim

Drogo of Nesle, a relative of Ralph, Lord of Soissons, was a knight who joined the army of Emicho, Count of Flonheim. He was one of the knights that survived the violent dispersal of Emicho's People's Crusade army by Hungarian forces during the First Crusade. Later Drogo, along with Clarembald of Vendeuil, joined the forces of Hugh, Count of Vermandois in Constantinople. He later joined the army of Godfrey of Bouillon.

== Sources ==
- A Database of Crusaders to the Holy Land, 1095-1149 (available on-line)
- Kostick, Conor, The Social Structure of the First Crusade, Brill Publishing, Leiden, 2008 (available on Google Books)
- Kostick, Conor, The Siege of Jerusalem: Crusade and Conquest in 1099, Bloomsbury Publishing, London, 2011 (available on Google Books)
