= William Thomas Carpenter =

William Thomas 'Will Tom' Carpenter (November 16, 1854, in Johnson County, Missouri – March 30, 1933), the youngest son of James and Cynthia (Johnson) Carpenter, was a legendary cowman who authored a book about his experiences.

Dust cover of Will Tom Carpenter's book Lucky 7, A Cowman's Autobiography, 1957.

== Ancestry ==
He was descended from a noteworthy Swiss-American family whose surname was Zimmermann, anglicized to Carpenter in anglophone North America. The emigrant ancestor, Will Tom's great-great-grandfather, George Carpenter, enlisted in the First Virginia Regiment at the outbreak of the American Revolution and died in service of wounds received in the Battle of Brandywine. His great-grandfather Adam Carpenter was one of three brothers who established Carpenter's Station, Kentucky, in 1780.

== Early life ==
When he was an infant, his family, who were Southern sympathizers, moved to Bourbon County, Kansas, then migrated in a wagon train up the Platte River to settle near Pike's Peak, El Paso County, Colorado. From 1862 to 1900, as cowhand and later as trail boss, he traveled all the famed cattle trails of Texas, Oklahoma, New Mexico, Kansas, Colorado, Montana, Nevada, Utah, and Arizona.

== Later life ==
He married late in 1875 or early in 1876 in Missouri to Mattie Christenson, who was born August 28, 1859, at Copenhagen, Denmark; she was 16 years old. After his retirement from "cowboying," they settled on their ranch west of the Pecos in Terrell County, Texas. He died on March 30, 1933, in the Kerr Hotel in Sanderson, Texas, where he had gone for medical treatment.

Mattie (Christensen) Carpenter survived her husband by three years and inherited his estate. She left no will and no relative could be found after her death on September 1, 1936, so the state of Texas became her heir.
