= William the Carpenter =

Viscount of Melun

- Born: France
- Occupation: Viscount of Melun
- Known for: Crusader
- Relatives: Hugh I, Count of Vermandois, Philip I of France

William the Carpenter (fl. 1087–1102), viscount of Melun, was a French nobleman who participated in the Reconquista in Spain and on the First Crusade. He was notorious for defecting from the army both in Spain and on the crusade, but he was also known for his strength in battle, whence he earned his nickname "the Carpenter." He returned to the Holy Land after the crusade, and nothing further is known of his life or death.

== Life ==
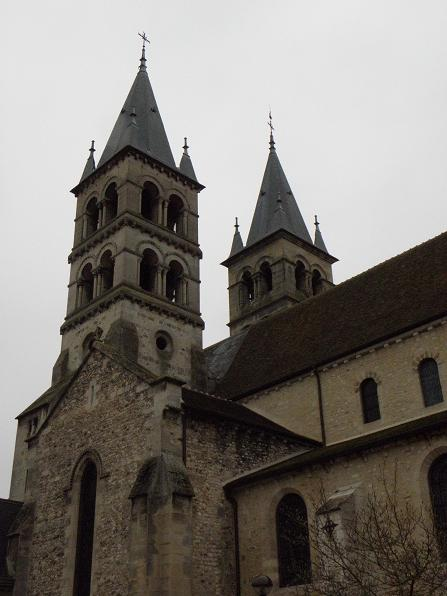
The Collegiate Church of Notre-Dame, Melun, dating from the eleventh century.

=== Succession ===
His specific origins are unclear; according to the seventeenth-century genealogist Père Anselme, he was the son of Ursio I, viscount of Melun, a town about 50 kilometres outside Paris in the Brie region of the French Vexin, which was later known as the Île-de-France. Anselme believed William succeeded his father in 1084, and was later succeeded by his own son, Ursio II. However, in the nineteenth century, Adolphe Duchalais showed that Anselme misread the charters he was using; all that is known for certain is that Ursio was viscount in 1085 and William was viscount in 1094. There is no definite record of an Ursio II, and after William there is no viscount known until Adam, who married the daughter of the previous, unnamed viscount in 1138. William was presumably related to Ursio but his specific relationship to him and the other viscounts is unknown.

According to twelfth-century chronicler Robert the Monk, William was "of royal stock" and was related to Hugh I, Count of Vermandois and Hugh's brother King Philip I of France.

=== Military exploits ===
According to twelfth-century monk Guibert of Nogent, William was "powerful in words, but less so in action...a man who set out to do things too great for him." William was a member of the French contingent which marched into Spain in 1087 to assist Alfonso VI of Castile with the siege of Tudela against the Almoravids. He may have been one of the leaders, along with Eudes I, Duke of Burgundy, who was the nephew of Alfonso's wife Constance. The French army never made it to Tudela and withdrew with little success. Guibert says that William "retreated like a wretch, leaving countless men stranded by his flight." William's actions in Spain may have been the inspiration for the character of Ganelon in the Chanson de Roland, which was possibly written in the early twelfth-century, based on similar events that had occurred during the reign of Charlemagne centuries earlier.

In France, Guibert says he engaged in petty warfare against other nobles and "criminal looting" of the countryside, in contravention of the Peace and Truce of God. In 1096 he joined the First Crusade, and "took from his poor neighbors the little that they had to provide himself shamefully with provisions for the journey." He participated in the attacks on Jews at Mainz, led by Emich of Flonheim. Emich's army later battled against the Hungarians, during which William "beheaded the chief of the Hungarian army, who was a member of the [King Coloman's] counsel, a distinguished man with dazzling snow-white hair." After the dispersal of Emich's army following this battle, William and the other French leaders joined the army of his relative Hugh of Vermandois. Hugh's army marched south into Italy, and at Bari, Hugh sent William across the sea to Dyrrhachium as an ambassador to the Byzantine governor of the city. William then travelled to Constantinople with Hugh, and he was among the men who came to meet Godfrey of Bouillon when Godfrey arrived at the city later in the year.

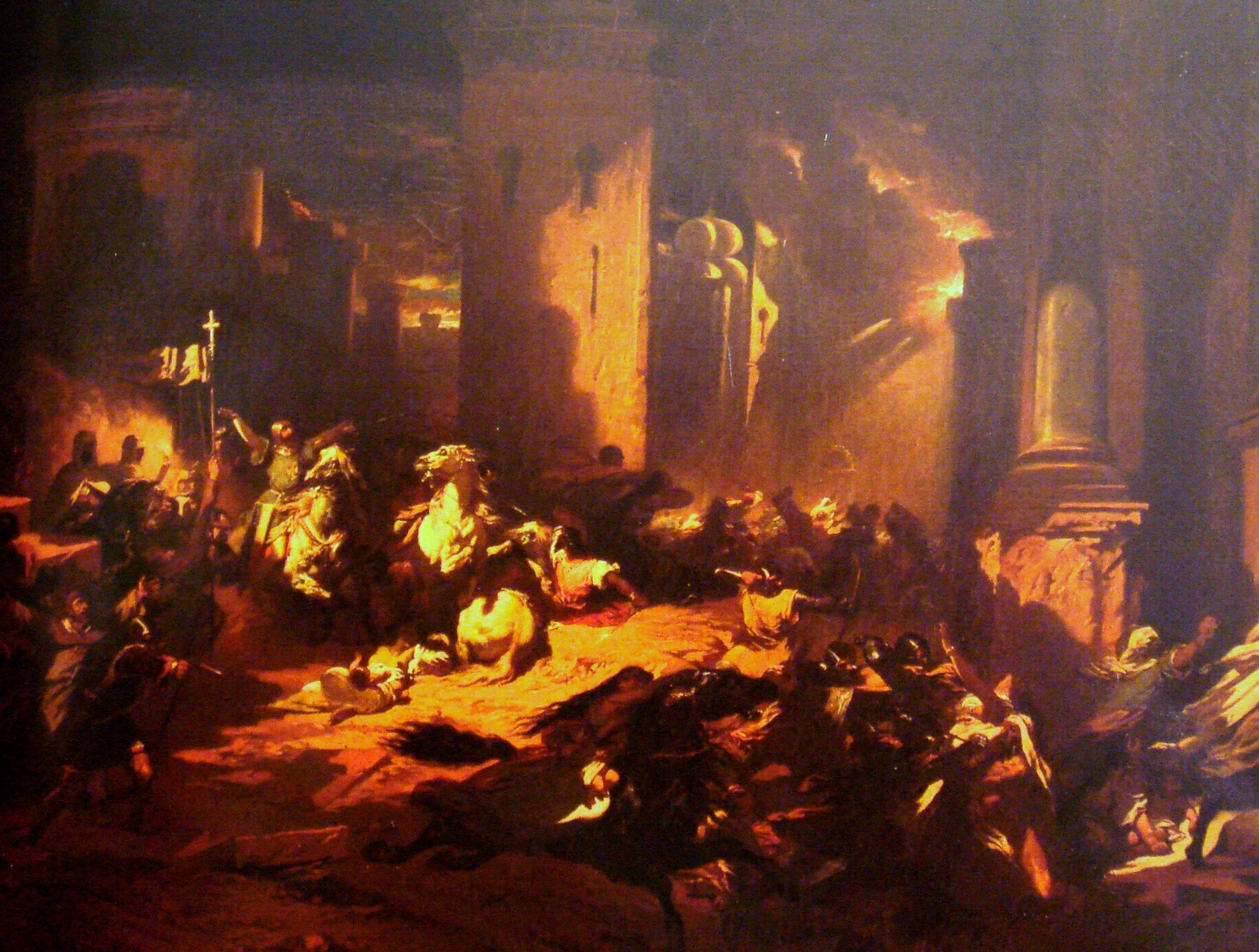
Capture of Antioch by Bohemond of Taranto. Painting by L. Gallait, 1840.

No further mention of William is made until the Siege of Antioch in 1098. The crusaders had successfully taken the city, but were then besieged themselves by a large Muslim army led by Kerbogha of Mosul. The crusaders suffered from lack of supplies, and there were many desertions; William fled Antioch in January 1098, along with the French monk Peter the Hermit, who had led his own army to Constantinople before the main crusaders arrived there. William was probably a member of Bohemond of Taranto's army at this point, because Bohemond sent his nephew Tancred to find them, and they were brought back to Bohemond's camp. Robert the Monk assumes that William fled because "he had never before experienced such suffering from hunger." William "spent the whole of the night...in Bohemond's tent, lying on the ground like a piece of rubbish." Bohemond rebuked him as a "wretched disgrace to the whole Frankish army", and mentioned his desertion of the French army in Spain in 1087. The other leaders asked Bohemond to spare him and William suffered no further punishment. However, William was so ashamed that he deserted the army again.

Albert of Aachen says William's second desertion occurred in June 1098, along with William of Grand-Mesnil, a relative of Bohemond. On the road away from Antioch, they joined Stephen of Blois, another leader of the crusade who had also fled the siege. They travelled back towards Constantinople, but on the way met Emperor Alexius I Comnenus, who was advancing to Antioch with a relief army. They convinced him of the futility of the crusader siege and the emperor turned back to Constantinople.

William apparently returned to the Holy Land in the Crusade of 1101. The First Crusade had successfully conquered Jerusalem, and those who had returned home before completing the journey were often shamed into going on crusade a second time; some of them, like Stephen of Blois, were killed on their second journey. William, however, survived to participate in the politics of the newfound Kingdom of Jerusalem; he was among the men who petitioned King Baldwin I to restore Daimbert of Pisa as Latin Patriarch of Jerusalem. He was also present at Baldwin I's siege of Ascalon in 1102. William may have settled in the north, in the crusader Principality of Antioch as a vassal of Bohemond, because he appears as a witness in a charter from Antioch in 1101.

== Nickname ==
William's actions at the Siege of Antioch are known from the Gesta Francorum, an anonymous chronicle written by an Italo-Norman eyewitness. The Gesta was very popular in Europe after the crusade, but was considered crudely written by more refined readers. It was later rewritten and expanded by more educated writers, including the French monks Robert and Guibert, both of whom were eager to add information about French crusaders like William. According to Robert, William "acquired the name of 'Carpenter' because nobody wanted to take him on in battle—there was no breastplate, helmet or shield which could withstand the shattering impact of his lance or sword." Guibert says that he "was called the Carpenter, not because he was a craftsman in wood, but because he prevailed in battle like a carpenter, by cutting men down", and has Bohemond ask: "what kind of Carpenter did we have, who, like a construction-worker with a pick-axe, hacked away, with lances and swords, at the backs of the Gentiles?" Christopher Tyerman interprets this as William's "skills as a battlefield butcher". Edward Gibbon, apparently misunderstanding Guibert, thought the nickname came "from the weighty strokes of his axe".
