= William J. Carpenter =

- Born: April 17, 1827; Braxton County, Virginia
- Died: February 21, 1921 (aged 93); Braxton County, West Virginia

William J. Carpenter (April 17, 1827 – February 21, 1921) was an American outdoorsman from West Virginia. He was said to have had "no equal" in skills at hunting and fishing, and to be the best long rifle marksman in his community in his younger years—his skill in hitting difficult targets in squirrel hunting earned him the nickname "Squirrely Bill."

Carpenter was a descendant of Jeremiah Carpenter, the first Euro-American man to settle in the upper Elk River valley, at or near the mouth of Holly River, in the year of 1784. His father was the first Euro-American child born in that section of Webster County, Virginia, created from Greenbrier County, Virginia in 1788.

Carpenter's extended family is known for producing noteworthy raconteurs and musicians.
