= Rock of Israel =

Concept in Judaism

The Rock of Israel (Hebrew: צור ישראל, Tzur Yisrael) is a concept in Judaism that alludes to God, and in Zionism and politics, to the cultural and historical heritage of the Jewish people and the foundation of the State of Israel. The term was used in the Israeli Declaration of Independence as a compromise between religious Jews and secular Jews.

== Definition ==
In Psalm 19:15 of the Hebrew Bible, God is referred to as the "Lord, my Rock and my Redeemer". In religious terms, the "Rock" means God, who protects the Jewish people and is the center of their faith, which defines their identity and consciousness. The term indicates the trust and faith of people in God, who is immutable. However, secular Zionists have interpreted this term in a non-religious way to mean the cultural and historical heritage that has preserved Jewish community and identity over centuries. Both meanings have influenced the movement for the return of Jews to the Eretz Israel and the creation of the Jewish state of Israel.

A phrase beginning "Rock of Israel" is part of the morning prayers in some versions of the prayerbook, where it is recited immediately before the Shemonah Esrei prayer.

== Controversy ==
The term "Rock of Israel" was subject of controversy just before the promulgation of the Israeli Declaration of Independence on 14 May 1948. The leaders present at the ceremony and who were to be signatories of the declaration believed that the declaration should express the fundamental values and principles that would define the new state, which would give the Jewish people a homeland in Palestine.

The Jewish religious leaders, led by Rabbi Fishman-Maimon wanted a clear reference to God by the usage of the words "The Rock of Israel and its Redeemer." However, a large segment of the Jewish leadership included those with secular and socialist convictions who sought a clear separation of church and state. Aharon Zisling, the left-wing leader of Mapam refused to sign the declaration of independence if it contained references to "a God in whom he did not believe." The disagreement threatened to derail the actual and ceremonial proclamation of the establishment of a Jewish state in the former British Mandate of Palestine.

Israeli leader David Ben-Gurion, who would become the country's first Prime Minister, spent the morning of 14 May mediating the dispute between Rabbi Maimon and Zisling. After hours of talks, Rabbi Maimon agreed to leave out the term "Redeemer" from the text of the declaration. The compromise was included without a final vote.

Later in his life Ben-Gurion is said to have explained that to him, "Rock of Israel" meant "the Old Testament with its history and traditions" or "Tzahal" (the Israeli army).

== English translation ==
Significantly, the whole passage containing the words "Rock of Israel" was not included in the English-language translation that was released for publication, owing to the military censorship imposed to keep the time and place of the ceremony secret in the wake of the war that was about to begin.

Despite Ben-Gurion's conviction that "Rock of Israel" was not necessarily a religious term, the official English translation composed by Moshe Sharet, and cited in official documents, rendered it as "Almighty God." It was not until 1962 that the Israeli government changed it to the more literal "Rock of Israel".

== See also ==
- Labour Zionism
- Names of God in Judaism
