= Crystal Caliburn =

1993 pinball video game

- Developer: LittleWing
- Publisher: StarPlay
- Designer: Yoshikatsu Fujita
- Programmer: Yoshikatsu Fujita
- Platforms: iOS, Macintosh, Windows, Windows 3.x, Windows Mobile
- Release: WW: 1993
- Genre: Pinball

Crystal Caliburn is a video pinball game by Japanese studio LittleWing (ja) and published by StarPlay for Macintosh in 1993 and for Windows in 1994; updated versions were released for Windows Mobile, and then iOS in 2012. The game partly takes its name from an alternative name for Excalibur.

== Gameplay ==
The developers published an extensive manual, including general pinball playing techniques.

The game consists of a single pinball table, and has a knightly theme, featuring characters such as Merlin and King Arthur. The goal is to summon knights who can restore the Holy Grail to Camelot.

The game includes a ramp on either side of the table. There are four banks of targets. The upper bank is used to light ball locks, the central bank, called "Glass Island" (referring to Avalon) lights targets for a limited time, and the two banks on either side are used to light random awards.

The main multiball, called multi-battle, is started after the player locks three balls and has the objective of scoring jackpots.

A circle of twelve lights is shown on the lower part of the playfield which are lit by accolading knights by shooting various targets. After collecting twelve knights to complete the round table the player can shoot the left ramp to collect the Holy Grail, and by shooting the right ramp within five seconds can return it to Camelot to start the wizard mode, Last Battle multi-ball.

High scores could be submitted to the publisher, and the top 3 players each month won a Crystal Caliburn T-shirt, along with anyone who could score over 100M points.

== Development ==
Crystal Caliburn is designed to be like a 1980s pinball machine, and is the first game by LittleWing to feature ramps.

It is the third pinball simulation developed by LittleWing, after Tristan and Eight Ball Deluxe. It is the second table to feature King Arthur, following Tristan. The playfield is shown on the left part of the screen, with scoring and a stained glass window display on the right.

== Reception ==
Reception

Review scores
Publication	Score
AllGame	4.5/5
Computer Gaming World	PC: 4/5
PC Gamer (UK)	PC: 90%
Aktueller Software Markt	PC: 9/10
Computer Game Review	89%
Electronic Games	PC: A−

In 1996, Computer Gaming World declared Crystal Caliburn the 140th-best computer game ever released.

AllGame was "pleasantly surprised" finding it to have deceptively simple play.

A reviewer for Mac Game Gate found it to be the best pinball game they had played, though were a little irritated by the screen scrolling if set to 640x480 resolution.

Christopher Breen found the ball to move slower than on Eight Ball Deluxe, but still felt it moved realistically. The sounds and visuals were declared as good, and the game enjoyable.

Laurie Yates for Electronic Games found the game "simply magnificent", going beyond its superficial beauty.

PC Gamer found it to have realistic graphics and no screen scrolling, demonstrating what was possible without using CD-ROM.

Aktueller Software Markt enjoyed the simple top-down view and found the sound effects to be quite good.

A reviewer for The Flipside found it to be an excellent game with a variety of strategies available for players, and almost perfect apart from quirks with inconsistency from the flippers.

Three reviewers for Computer Game Review viewed the game positively, with one saying it set a new standard for pinball on a computer.

== Sequel ==
The sixth pinball game by LittleWing, called Golden Logres, continued the story based on Arthurian legend.
