= William H. Carpenter (1821–1885) =

American diplomat

William Henry Carpenter
- William Henry Carpenter 1821–1885
- Born: 1821; Auburn, New York
- Died: October 25, 1885 (aged 63–64); Auburn, New York
- Occupations: Merchant; Public Servant
- Known for: U.S. Consul to Fuzhou, China, 1861–1865

William Henry Carpenter (1821–1885), was U.S. Consul to Fuzhou, China, during the American Civil War years. He was appointed by President Abraham Lincoln in March, 1861, and recalled by President Andrew Johnson in December, 1865.

Prior to his appointment to the consulship, Carpenter was proprietor of a livery stable in his hometown of Auburn, Cayuga, New York and was active in local civic matters, serving as postmaster of Fleming village in the early 1850s, state commissioner for development of the salt springs at Montezuma, New York from 1858, on the first board of directors for the city waterworks company from 1859, and as a founding member of the Cayuga County Historical Society in 1877. He was sometimes styled "Colonel", a rank-equivalent title from his service as a consul.

Carpenter also was active in state politics, identifying with the Republican Party in its formative years, and supporting New York Governor William H. Seward, 12th Governor of New York, United States Senator and United States Secretary of State under Lincoln and Johnson, who became a lifelong friend. After his service in China, Carpenter retired to Auburn, where he lived until his death at the age of 64, on Sunday, October 25, 1885.

== Personal ==
Carpenter was a son of Erastus and Mary (née Taylor) Carpenter, born in 1821 at Auburn, Cayuga, New York, where his father was an early merchant. He married Sevira Wethey in 1848, with whom he had two children before her untimely death in 1864.
