= William Henry Carpenter (philologist) =

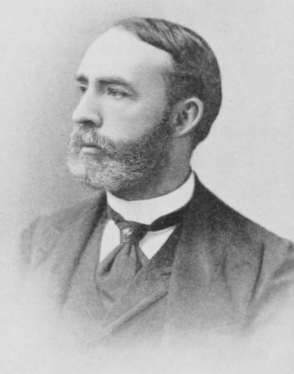
- Born: July 15, 1853; Utica, New York
- Died: November 25, 1936 (aged 83); Downingtown, Pennsylvania
- Resting place: Northwood Cemetery
- Education: Cornell University; Johns Hopkins University; Hamilton College; University of Leipzig; University of Freiburg
- Occupation: Philologist
- Spouse: Anna Morgan Douglass (m. 1884)
- Children: 3

William Henry Carpenter (1853–1936) was an American philologist, and provost for Columbia University.

== Biography ==
William Henry Carpenter was born in Utica, New York on July 15, 1853. He was educated at Cornell, Johns Hopkins, Hamilton College, Leipzig, and Freiburg. He then became instructor in rhetoric and lecturer on North European literature at Cornell in 1883. At Columbia University, he was instructor of German and Scandinavian languages, 1883–89; assistant professor of Germanic languages and literature, 1889–90; adjunct professor, 1890–95; and in 1895 professor of German philology. In 1912 he became the provost of Columbia. He was trustee and secretary of the Columbia University Press.

He was elected vice president of the Germanistic Society of America, and edited the Germanistic Society Quarterly. He was a member of the Authors Club and Century Club of New York City.

Among his students in Germanics were linguist Edward Sapir.

He married Anna Morgan Douglass on July 2, 1884, and they had three children.

William Henry Carpenter died in Downingtown, Pennsylvania on November 25, 1936. He was buried at Northwood Cemetery.

== Works ==
- Grundriss der neuisländischen Grammatik (1881)
- Nikolasdrapa Halls Prest, An Icelandic Poem from A. D. 1400 (1881)
- Some Conditions of American Education (1911)

He contributed to dictionaries and encyclopedias and to magazines and reviews.
