= Robert Chazan =

American historian (1936–2024)

- Born: April 25, 1936; Albany, New York, U.S.
- Died: February 12, 2024 (aged 87)
- Occupations: Historian, researcher, author, and rabbi
- Awards: National Jewish Book Award (1988)

Academic background
- Education: Columbia College (BA); Jewish Theological Seminary (Semikhah); Columbia University (MA), (PhD)

Robert Leon Chazan (April 25, 1936 – February 12, 2024) was an American historian who was the S.H. and Helen R. Scheuer Professor of Hebrew and Judaic Studies at New York University.

== Life and career ==
Robert Leon Chazan was born in Albany, New York on April 25, 1936.

According to Andrew Gow writing in Speculum, Chazan is, "a distinguished scholar in the field of Jewish history and Christian-Jewish relations in the high Middle Ages."

A festschrift published in Chazan's honor and edited by David Engel, Lawrence Schiffman, Elliot Wolfson, and Yechiel Schur, lists, "the history of the Jewish communities in Western Christendom during the Middle Ages, Jewish-Christian interactions in medieval Europe, medieval Jewish Biblical exegesis and religious literature, and historical representations of the experience of medieval Jewry," as 4 of the scholarly concerns that have been central to Chazan's work.

Chazan died on February 12, 2024, at the age of 87.

== Bibliography ==
- The Trial of the Talmud: Paris, 1240 (Pontifical Institute of Mediaeval Studies, 2012)
- Reassessing Jewish Life in Medieval Europe (Cambridge University Press, 2010)
- The Jews of Medieval Western Christendom. Cambridge Medieval Textbooks. 2006. ISBN 0521616646.
- Fashioning Jewish Identity in Medieval Western Christendom (Cambridge: Cambridge University Press, 2004)
- God, Humanity, and History: The Hebrew First-Crusade Narratives (Berkeley and Los Angeles: University of California Press, 2000)
- Medieval Stereotypes and Modern Antisemitism (Berkeley and Los Angeles: University of California Press, 1997)
- In the Year 1096: The Jews and the First Crusade. Jewish Publication Society of America. 1996. ISBN 0827609876.
- Barcelona and Beyond: The Disputation of 1263 and Its Aftermath. University of California Press. 1992. ISBN 0520911326.
- Daggers of Faith: Thirteenth-Century Christian Missionizing and Jewish Response (Berkeley and Los Angeles: University of California Press, 1989)
- European Jewry and the First Crusade. University of California Press. 1987. ISBN 0520055667.
- Church, State, and Jew in the Middle Ages. Behrman House. 1980. ISBN 0874413028.
- Modern Jewish History. Schocken Books. 1975. ISBN 0805235663.
- Medieval Jewry in Northern France (Baltimore: Johns Hopkins University Press, 1974)

== Awards ==
1988: National Jewish Book Award in Jewish History for European Jewry and the First Crusade
