= Mainz Anonymous =

Medieval Jewish manuscript

The Mainz Anonymous (or the Narrative of the Old Persecutions) is an account of the First Crusade of 1096 written soon thereafter by an anonymous Jewish author. The work is written in Hebrew. Its author is unknown, and it deals primarily with the Crusaders' actions in Mainz; hence the name commonly applied to it. However, it also deals with the ShUM-cities in the Rhineland, specifically Speyer and Worms. It is not entirely accurate: it has a definite Jewish point of view and fictionalizes anecdotes occasionally to make a point. It also includes occasional anguished supplications to God.

== References and further reading ==
- Robert Chazan, European Jewry and the First Crusade (California, 1987).
- Robert Chazan, In the Year 1096: The First Crusade and the Jews (JPS, 1996).
- A. M. Habermann, גזרות אשכנז וצרפת [Massacres of France and Germany, Hebrew] (c. 1945).
