= 1955 Nobel Prize in Literature =

- Halldór Kiljan Laxness
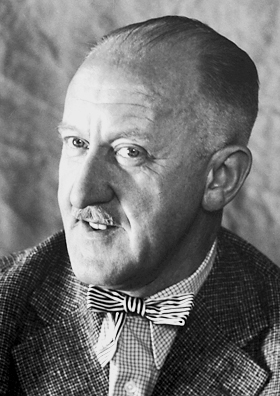
- "for his vivid epic power which has renewed the great narrative art of Iceland."
- Date: 6 October 1955 (announcement); 10 December 1955 (ceremony)
- Location: Stockholm, Sweden
- Presented by: Swedish Academy
- First award: 1901
- Website: Official website

The 1955 Nobel Prize in Literature was awarded to the Icelandic writer Halldór Kiljan Laxness (1902–1998) "for his vivid epic power which has renewed the great narrative art of Iceland." He is the first and only Icelandic recipient of the Nobel prize in all categories. The literary critic Sveinn Hoskuldsson described him, saying:

"His chief literary works belong to the genre... [of] narrative prose fiction. In the history of our literature Laxness is mentioned beside Snorri Sturluson, the author of "Njals saga", and his place in world literature is among writers such as Cervantes, Zola, Tolstoy, and Hamsun... He is the most prolific and skillful essayist in Icelandic literature both old and new..."

== Laureate ==
Halldór Laxness wrote novels, poetry, journalism, essays and plays. The conventional Icelandic saga influenced Laxness, best known for three series of books that are set in Iceland and in some way incorporate social realism and were written in the 1930s. Salka Valka: A Novel of Iceland (1931–1932), a two part series that describes life in an Icelandic fishing village; Sjálfstaett fólk: Hetjusaga ("Independent People: An Epic", 1934–35), a two part series about crofters on the moor; and Heimsljós ("World Light", 1937–1940), a four-part series based on the life of poet Magnus Hjaltason Magnusson. His other famous works include The Great Weaver from Kashmir ("Vefarinn mikli frá Kasmír", 1927), Atómstöðin ("The Atom Station", 1948), Brekkukotsannáll ("The Fish Can Sing", 1957), and Kristnihald undir Jökli ("Christianity at Glacier", 1968).

== Deliberations ==
=== Nominations ===
In total, the Nobel Committee received 59 nominations for 46 writers. 17 of the nominees were newly nominated including Ezra Pound, Edith Sitwell, Adriaan Roland Holst, William Somerset Maugham, Eugenio Montale (awarded in 1975), Henri Bosco, Ernst Robert Curtius, Giorgos Seferis (awarded in 1963), Saint-John Perse (awarded in 1960), Carlos Vaz Ferreira, and Giovanni Papini. Three of the nominees were women namely the British critic Edith Sitwell, the Estonian poet Marie Under, and the Danish author Karen Blixen. The Colombian writer Fernando González Ochoa was purportedly nominated in 1955, but is not included in the archives.

The authors James Agee, Ruby Mildred Ayres, Gilbert Cannan, Dale Carnegie, Beatrice Chase, Robert P. Tristram Coffin, Lawrence Pearsall Jacks, Joseph Jefferson Farjeon, Constance Holme, Hong Shen, Mariano Latorre, Roger Mais, Saadat Hasan Manto, Adrienne Monnier, Robert Riskin, Robert E. Sherwood, Alexandru Teodor Stamatiad, Wallace Stevens, Pierre Teilhard de Chardin, and Augustin Josip Ujević died in 1955 without having been nominated for the prize.

Official list of nominees and their nominators for the prize
| No. | Nominee | Country | Genre(s) | Nominator(s) |
|---|---|---|---|---|
| 1 | Mark Aldanov (1886–1957) | Soviet Union (Ukraine); France | biography, novel, essays, literary criticism | Samson Soloveitchik (1887–1974) |
| 2 | Eugène Baie (1874–1964) | Belgium | law, essays | Royal Academy of Science, Letters and Fine Arts of Belgium |
| 3 | Julien Benda (1867–1956) | France | novel, philosophy, essays, literary criticism | Holger Sten (1907–1971) |
| 4 | Gottfried Benn (1886–1956) | West Germany | poetry, essays | Bertil Malmberg (1889–1958) |
| 5 | Karen Blixen (1885–1962) | Denmark | novel, short story, memoir | Nils Ahnlund (1889–1957) |
| 6 | Henri Bosco (1888–1976) | France | novel, short story | Raymond Las Vergnas (1902–1994) |
| 7 | Arthur Bryant (1899–1985) | United Kingdom | history | Eric Reginald Vincent (1894–1978) |
| 8 | Albert Camus (1913–1960) | France (Algeria) | novel, short story, essays, philosophy, drama | Bo Bergman (1869–1967); Henrik Samuel Nyberg (1889–1974); Birger Ekeberg (1880–1968) |
| 9 | Hans Carossa (1878–1956) | West Germany | poetry, autobiography, essays | Maurice Le Boucher (1882–1964) |
| 10 | Paul Claudel (1868–1955) | France | poetry, drama, essays, memoir | Erik Hjalmar Linder (1906–1994) |
| 11 | Ernst Robert Curtius (1886–1956) | West Germany | philology, literary criticism | Max Vasmer (1886–1962) |
| 12 | Georges Duhamel (1884–1966) | France | novel, short story, poetry, drama, literary criticism | Maurice Le Boucher (1882–1964); André Plassart (1889–1978) |
| 13 | Johan Falkberget (1879–1967) | Norway | novel, short story, essays | Harald Beyer (1891–1960); Hans Heiberg (1904–1978) |
| 14 | Lion Feuchtwanger (1884–1958) | Germany | novel, drama | Victor Klemperer (1881–1960) |
| 15 | Edward Morgan Forster (1879–1970) | United Kingdom | novel, short story, drama, essays, biography, literary criticism | Denys Page (1908–1978) |
| 16 | Robert Frost (1874–1963) | United States | poetry, drama | Cecil Day-Lewis (1904–1972) |
| 17 | Igor Gouzenko (1919–1982) | Soviet Union; Canada | novel, essays | Eugene Hudson Long (1908–1990); Gerald Warner Brace (1901–1978) |
| 18 | Gunnar Gunnarsson (1889–1975) | Iceland | novel, short story, poetry | Harry Martinson (1904–1978); Henry Olsson (1896–1985); Stellan Arvidson (1902–1997) |
| 19 | Leslie Poles Hartley (1895–1972) | United Kingdom | novel, short story, essays | Geoffrey Tillotson (1905–1969) |
| 20 | Aldous Huxley (1894–1963) | United Kingdom | novel, short story, essays, poetry, screenplay, drama, philosophy | Geoffrey Bullough (1901–1982) |
| 21 | Juan Ramón Jiménez (1881–1958) | Spain | poetry, novel | Hjalmar Gullberg (1898–1961) |
| 22 | Rudolf Kassner (1873–1959) | Austria | philosophy, essays, translation | The Austrian PEN-Club |
| 23 | Nikos Kazantzakis (1883–1957) | Greece | novel, philosophy, essays, drama, memoir, translation | Lorentz Eckhoff (1884–1974); Society of Men of Letters of Greece |
| 24 | Halldór Laxness (1902–1998) | Iceland | novel, short story, drama, poetry | Steingrímur Þorsteinsson (1911–1973); Jón Helgason (1899–1986); Sigurður Nordal (1886–1974); Sverker Ek (1887–1981); Elias Wessén (1889–1981); Stellan Arvidson (1902–1997) |
| 25 | André Malraux (1901–1976) | France | novel, essays, literary criticism | Gladys Turquet-Milnes (1887–1977) |
| 26 | William Somerset Maugham (1874–1965) | United Kingdom | novel, short story, drama, essays | Geoffrey Bullough (1901–1982) |
| 27 | Ramón Menéndez Pidal (1869–1968) | Spain | philology, history | Gunnar Tilander (1894–1973); Rudolf Grossmann (1892–1980) |
| 28 | Eugenio Montale (1896–1981) | Italy | poetry, translation | Thomas Stearns Eliot (1888–1965) |
| 29 | Alberto Moravia (1907–1990) | Italy | novel, literary criticism, essays, drama | Carlo Dionisotti (1908–1998) |
| 30 | Seán O'Casey (1880–1964) | Ireland | drama, memoir | Una Ellis-Fermor (1894–1958) |
| 31 | Giovanni Papini (1881–1956) | Italy | essays, novel, short story, poetry, literary criticism, philosophy | Henri de Ziégler (1885–1970) |
| 32 | Saint-John Perse (1887–1975) | France | poetry | Thomas Stearns Eliot (1888–1965); Dag Hammarskjöld (1905–1961) |
| 33 | Ezra Pound (1885–1972) | United States | poetry, essays | Constantine Athanasius Trypanis (1909–1993) |
| 34 | Adriaan Roland Holst (1888–1976) | Netherlands | poetry | Jan Kamerbeek Jr. (1905–1977) |
| 35 | Jules Romains (1885–1972) | France | poetry, drama, screenplay | Alfred Jolivet (1885–1966) |
| 36 | Reinhold Schneider (1903–1958) | West Germany | poetry, novel, drama, essays | Eduard von Jan (1885–1971) |
| 37 | Giorgos Seferis (1900–1971) | Greece | poetry, memoir, essays | Romilly Jenkins (1907–1969) |
| 38 | Mikhail Sholokhov (1905–1984) | Soviet Union | novel | Sergei Sergeyev-Tsensky (1875–1958) |
| 39 | Edith Sitwell (1887–1964) | United Kingdom | poetry, essays, memoir | Gladys Doidge Willcock (–) |
| 40 | Gustav Suits (1883–1956) | Soviet Union (Estonia) | poetry, essays | William Kleesmann Matthews (1901–1958) |
| 41 | George Macauley Trevelyan (1876–1962) | United Kingdom | biography, autobiography, essays, history | Winston Churchill (1874–1965) |
| 42 | Marie Under (1883–1980) | Soviet Union (Estonia) | poetry | William Kleesmann Matthews (1901–1958) |
| 43 | Giuseppe Ungaretti (1888–1970) | Italy | poetry, essays, literary criticism | Giuseppe de Robertis (1888–1963); Robert Vivier (1894–1989); Thomas Stearns Eliot (1888–1965) |
| 44 | Carlos Vaz Ferreira (1872–1958) | Uruguay | philosophy, law, essays | Academia Nacional de Letras |
| 45 | Tarjei Vesaas (1897–1970) | Norway | poetry, novel | Sigmund Skard (1903–1995) |
| 46 | Simon Vestdijk (1898–1971) | Netherlands | novel, poetry, essays, translation | Jan Kamerbeek Jr. (1905–1977) |

=== Prize decision ===
Laxness had been a candidate for the prize since 1948. In 1955 he was shortlisted along with Juan Ramón Jiménez (awarded in 1956) and Ramón Menéndez Pidal. A shared prize between Laxness and his countryman Gunnar Gunnarsson was proposed but rejected by the Nobel committee.

The members of the Swedish Academy were divided in support of the final three candidates. Three rounds of voting were required to decide the laureate. On the first voting Jiménez received the highest number of votes, but not the required majority of the votes. On the third voting Laxness received a majority of the votes, 10 votes, and could be declared the winner of the 1955 Nobel Prize in Literature.

== Award Ceremony ==
In the presentation address for the Nobel prize Elias Wessén stated:

"He is an excellent painter of Icelandic scenery and settings. Yet this is not what he has conceived of as his chief mission. 'Compassion is the source of the highest poetry. Compassion with Asta Sollilja on earth,' he says in one of his best books... And a social passion underlies everything Halldór Laxness has written. His personal championship of contemporary social and political questions is always very strong, sometimes so strong that it threatens to hamper the artistic side of his work. His safeguard then is the astringent humour which enables him to see even people he dislikes in a redeeming light, and which also permits him to gaze far down into the labyrinths of the human soul."
