= Fóstbrœðra saga =

Icelandic saga

Fóstbrœðra saga or The Saga of the Sworn Brothers is one of the sagas of Icelanders. It relates the deeds of the sworn brothers Þorgeir and Þormóðr in early-11th-century Iceland and abroad. Þorgeir is a capable and insanely brave warrior. He kills people for trifles and for sport. Þormóðr is a more complicated character; warrior, trouble-maker, womanizer and poet. The saga contains poetry attributed to him, including parts of a lay on his blood brother. It is said that a cairn called Þorgeirsdys, identifies the place of death and burial of Þorgeir. This is located on the Hraunhafnartangi peninsula, just south of the modern lighthouse.

== Manuscripts and dating ==
The saga survives in three early manuscripts. Each has a rather different version of the text:

- Hauksbók (earlier fourteenth century), beginning missing due to lost pages
- Möðruvallabók (mid-fourteenth century), end missing due to lost pages
- Flateyjarbók (c. 1390)

The date of composition of the lost written archetype of Fóstbrœðra saga has been the subject of considerable dispute. Sigurður Nordal argued for ca. 1200 (Björn K. Þórólfsson and Guðni Jónsson 1943: lxxii) whereas Jónas Kristjánsson argued for the end of the century (1972, 310). There is no clear consensus, though Andersson's 2013 analysis preferred an early dating of 'presumably not much later than 1200' (2013, 72).

A long-standing controversy centers on which manuscripts represent the most original version. In particular, the debate has focused on several unusual "clauses" (Icelandic klausur) or asides in the saga which do not fit in with conventional saga style. These have been understood both as late interpolations and as signs of an early, developing saga style (Jónas Kristjánsson 1972).

The skaldic stanzas attributed to Þormóðr kolbrúnarskáld Bersason appear genuine (according to Guðni Jónsson in Björn K. Þórólfsson and Guðni Jónsson 1943: lxi); he would have composed ca. 1010-1030 (according to Guðni Jónsson in Björn K. Þórólfsson and Guðni Jónsson 1943: lxix).

== Critical reception ==
In the words of Lee M. Hollander (1949, 75),

The saga of the Sworn Brothers, Thorgeir and Thormod, occupies a position of secondary importance among the Old Icelandic family sagas—at least, it is not a favorite. There are good reasons for this: it does not have the scope and weight of such sagas as Njála, Eigla, Laxdæla, nor the depth and classic form of such as Hrafnkels saga, Gísla saga, Thorsteins saga hvíta; nor do students of Germanic antiquities value it because of any wealth of specific information on the history, religion, culture, laws of the Old North.

However, the saga has recently come to critical attention for the range and detail of its portrayals of women (Gos 2009).

== Influence ==
The saga is the basis for Halldór Laxness's novel Gerpla, and a key source for Dauðans óvissi tími, a 2004 novel by Þráinn Bertelsson.

== Bibliography ==
For a full bibliography of Fóstbræðra saga see Ryan E. Johnson, 'From the Westfjords to World Literature: A Bibliography on Fostbræðra saga', Scandinavian-Canadian Studies/Études scandinaves au Canada, 26 (2019), 312–19.

=== Editions ===
- Björn K. Þórólfsson (ed.), Fóstbrœðra saga, Samfund til udgivelse af gammel nordisk litteratur, 49 (Copenhagen: Jørgensen, 1925–27). (A diplomatic edition of all the main MSS.)
- Björn K. Þórólfsson and Guðni Jónsson (Eds.) (1943). Vestfirðinga sögur. Íslenzk fornrit. Vol. VI. Reykjavík: Hið íslenzka fornritafélag. OCLC 298938. (Normalised edition, with the main text following Möðruvallabók and its manuscript copies as far as it extends, giving the Hauksbók text at the foot of the page, and then giving the Hauksbók as the main text; various additional readings found in Flateyjarbók are also given.)
- Jónas Kristjánsson (1972). Um Fóstbræðrasögu. Rit (Stofnun Árna Magnússonar á Íslandi) (in Icelandic). Vol. 1. Reykjavík: Stofnun Árna Magnússonar. OCLC 1495403.
- Digitised text at Netútgáfan.

=== Translations ===
- The Sagas of Kormák and the Sworn Brothers, trans. by Lee M. Hollander (New York: Princeton University Press, 1949), pp. 83–176 (following Möðruvallabók as far as that goes − to chapter 20 — and Hauksbók thereafter).
- The Saga of the Sworn Brothers. Translated by Martin S. Regal. In: Viðar Hreinsson (General Editor): The Complete Sagas of Icelanders including 49 Tales. Reykjavík: Leifur Eiríksson Publishing, 1997. Volume II, pp. 329–402. ISBN 9979-9293-2-4.

=== Secondary literature ===
- Arnold, Martin, The Post-Classical Icelandic Family Saga, Scandinavian Studies, 9 (Lewiston: Mellen, 2003), pp. 141–80 (=chapter 4, ‘Beyond Independence, towards Post-Classicism, and the Case of Fóstbrœðra saga’)
- Andersson, Theodore M., 'Redating Fóstbrœðra saga ', in Dating the Sagas: Reviews and Revisions, ed. by Else Mundal (Copenhagen: Museum Tusculanum Press, 2013), pp. 55–76.
- Gos, Giselle (2009). "Women as a Source of heilræði, 'sound counsel': Social Mediation and Community Integration in Fóstbrœðra saga". Journal of English and Germanic Philology. 108 (3): 281–300. doi:10.1353/egp.0.0058.
- Harris, Richard L. "'Jafnan segir inn ríkri ráð': Proverbial Allusion and the Implied Proverb in Fóstbrœðra saga." In New Norse Studies: Essays on the Literature and Culture of Medieval Scandinavia, edited by Jeffrey Turco, 61–97. Islandica 58. Ithaca: Cornell University Library, 2015.
- Jónas Kristjánsson, Um fóstbræðrasögu, Rit (Stofnun Árna Magnússonar á Íslandi), 1 (Reykjavík: Stofnun Árna Magnússonar, 1972)
- Poole, Russell, Skaldsagas: Text, Vocation, and Desire in the Icelandic Sagas of Poets, Erganzungsbande Zum Reallexikon Der Germanischen Altertumskunde, 27 (Berlin: de Gruyter, 2001)
