= 1963 Nobel Prize in Literature =

- Giorgos Seferis
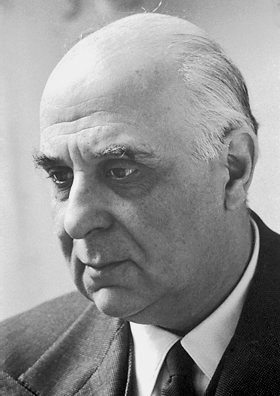
- "for his eminent lyrical writing, inspired by a deep feeling for the Hellenic world of culture."
- Date: 24 October 1963 (announcement); 10 December 1963 (ceremony)
- Location: Stockholm, Sweden
- Presented by: Swedish Academy
- First award: 1901
- Website: Official website

The 1963 Nobel Prize in Literature was awarded the Greek poet and diplomat Giorgos Seferis (1900–1971) "for his eminent lyrical writing, inspired by a deep feeling for the Hellenic world of culture." He is the first Greek laureate to win the Nobel Prize (followed by Odysseas Elytis in 1979).

== Laureate ==
Giorgos Seferis was born in Smyrna (present day İzmir, Turkey). When his family moved to France in 1918, he studied law at the University of Paris and became interested in literature. He then went to Athens in 1925 and began a long diplomatic career. During World War II, Seferis accompanied the Greek government-in-exile and returned to liberated Athens in 1944. Many of his, which are replete with themes of alienation, traveling, and death, are set against the backdrop of his extensive travels as a diplomat. Turning Point, his debut book of poems, was released in 1931. In his later poetry, Seferis frequently weaves together modern speech and experience with Homeric myth, notably in works like Mythistorema (1935) and Imerologio Katastromatos I-III (1940-1955).

== Deliberations ==
=== Nominations ===
Seferis was first nominated in 1955 by Romilly Jenkins (1907–1969), an English professor in Byzantine and Modern Greek literature, and was followed by nominations from T. S. Eliot, C. A. Trypanis and Eyvind Johnson until he was eventually awarded. He only received 5 nominations.

In total, the Nobel Committee of the Swedish Academy received 121 nominations for 81 distinguished authors such as Jorge Luis Borges, Jean-Paul Sartre (awarded in 1964), Martin Buber, E. M. Forster, Graham Greene, Salvador de Madariaga, André Malraux, and Ramón Menéndez Pidal. The highest number of nominations (with 8 nominations) was for the American poet Robert Frost. (Note: Robert Frost died on the 29th of January 1963, of complications from prostate surgery. Therefore, the eight nominations were for him to be posthumously awarded the Nobel Prize in Literature but since the Nobel Committee's regulations states that the prize may only be awarded posthumously if the decision has been made prior to the prizewinner's death, his case was not considered.) 22 of the nominees were nominated for the first time like Marcel Jouhandeau, Vladimir Nabokov, Michel Butor, Yukio Mishima, Jean Cocteau, André Breton, Nelly Sachs (awarded in 1966), René Étiemble, and Yevgeny Yevtushenko. Five of the nominees were women, namely Ingeborg Bachmann, Juana de Ibarbourou, Gertrud von le Fort, Kate Roberts, and Nelly Sachs. Surprisingly, two heads of state and government were nominated: French president Charles de Gaulle and Senegalese president Léopold Sédar Senghor.

The authors Ion Agârbiceanu, Herbert Asbury, Luis Cernuda, W. E. B. Du Bois, Pola Gojawiczyńska, Edith Hamilton, Christopher Hassall, Nâzım Hikmet, Ernst Kantorowicz, C. S. Lewis, Marie Linde, Brinsley MacNamara, Louis MacNeice, Margaret Murray, Clifford Odets, Yōko Ōta, Sylvia Plath, Theodore Roethke, Kay Sage, Tristan Tzara, Hilda Vīka, William Carlos Williams, Veza Canetti and Stark Young died in 1963 without having been nominated for the prize. The American poet Robert Frost died months before the announcement.

Official list of nominees and their nominators for the prize
No.	Nominee	Country	Genre(s)	Nominator(s)
1	Stefan Andres (1906–1970)	West Germany	novel, short story	Friedrich von der Leyen (1873–1966)
2	Jean Anouilh (1910–1987)	France	drama, screenplay, translation	Henry Olsson (1896–1985)
3	Louis Aragon (1897–1982)	France	novel, short story, poetry, essays	Michel Décaudin (1919–2004); Pierre Grappin (1915–1997); Jean Martin (1926–2007)
4	Wystan Hugh Auden (1907–1973)	United Kingdom; United States	poetry, essays, screenplay	Ronald Peacock (1907–1993); Henry Olsson (1896–1985)
5	Ingeborg Bachmann (1926–1973)	Austria	poetry, drama, novel, short story, essays	Harald Patzer (1910–2005)
6	Samuel Beckett (1906–1989)	Ireland	novel, drama, poetry	Johannes Edfelt (1904–1997)
7	Werner Bergengruen (1892–1964)	West Germany	novel, short story, poetry	Friedrich von der Leyen (1873–1966)
8	Jorge Luis Borges (1899–1986)	Argentina	poetry, essays, translation, short story	Henry Olsson (1896–1985)
9	André Breton (1896–1966)	France	history, poetry, essays	Gabriel Germain (1903–1978)
10	Martin Buber (1878–1965)	Austria; Israel	philosophy	André Neher (1914–1988)
11	Michel Butor (1926–2016)	France	poetry, novel, essays, translation	Jean Humbert (1901–1980)
12	Heinrich Böll (1917–1985)	West Germany	novel, short story	Gustav Korlén (1915–2014)
13	Josep Carner (1884–1970)	Spain	poetry, drama, translation	Antoni Maria Badia i Margarit (1920–2014); Agustín Durán Sanpere (1887–1975); Georg Schiffauer (1898–1977)
14	Emilio Cecchi (1884–1966)	Italy	literary criticism, screenplay	Howard Rosario Marraro (1897–1972)
15	René Char (1907–1988)	France	poetry	Monique Parent-Frazee (–); Georges Blin (1917–2005)
16	Jean Cocteau (1889–1963)	France	novel, poetry, drama, screenplay, essays	Léon Cellier (1911–1976)
17	Charles de Gaulle (1890–1970)	France	memoir, essays	Jacques Robichez (1914–1999); Jean François-Anatole Ricci (–)
18	Lawrence Durrell (1912–1990)	United Kingdom	novel, short story, poetry, drama, essays	Erich Burck (1901–1994); Paul Verniére (1916–1997)
19	Ingemar Düring (1903–1984)	Sweden	philology, biography, translation	Franz Dirlmeier (1904–1977)
20	Friedrich Dürrenmatt (1921–1990)	Switzerland	drama, novel, short story, essays	John V. Hagopian (–); Friedrich Sengle (1909–1994)
21	René Étiemble (1909–2002)	France	novel, literary criticism, essays	Auguste Haury (1910–2002)
22	Edward Morgan Forster (1879–1970)	United Kingdom	novel, short story, drama, essays, biography, literary criticism	Carl Becker (1925–1973); Simeon Potter (1898–1976); Kenneth Muir (1907–1996)
23	Max Frisch (1911–1991)	Switzerland	novel, drama	Franz Karl Stanzel (1923–2023); Heinrich Matthias Heinrichs (1911–1983)
24	Robert Frost (1874–1963)	United States	poetry, drama	Meyer Howard Abrams (1912–2015); Donald Frame (1911–1991); Moses Hadas (1900–1966); George Harris Healey (1908–1971); Frederick Albert Pottle (1897–1987); Carl Woodring (1919–2009); Lewis Gaston Leary (1906–1990); Wallace Stegner (1909–1993)
25	Rómulo Gallegos (1884–1969)	Venezuela	novel, short story	Gustavo Luis Carrera (1933–); Eugenio Florit (1903–1999)
26	Jean Giono (1895–1970)	France	novel, short story, essays, poetry, drama	Henri Fluchère (1898–1987); Raymond Lebègue (1895–1984)
27	Robert Graves (1895–1985)	United Kingdom	history, novel, poetry, literary criticism, essays	Douglas Grant (1921–1969)
28	Graham Greene (1904–1991)	United Kingdom	novel, short story, autobiography, essays	Robert Niklaus (1910–2001); Gabriel Turville-Petre (1908–1978); Frank Kermode (1919–2010)
29	Jean Guéhenno (1890–1978)	France	essays, literary criticism	Edmond Jarno (1905–1985)
30	Jorge Guillén (1893–1984)	Spain	poetry, literary criticism	Henri Peyre (1901–1988)
31	Taha Hussein (1889–1973)	Egypt	novel, short story, poetry, translation	Charles Pellat (1914–1992)
32	Aldous Huxley (1894–1963)	United Kingdom	novel, short story, essays, poetry, screenplay, drama, philosophy	Heinrich Wolfgang Donner (1904-1980); José Axelrad (1915–1969)
33	Juana de Ibarbourou (1892–1979)	Uruguay	poetry, essays	Academia Nacional de Letras
34	Jarosław Iwaszkiewicz (1894–1980)	Poland	poetry, essays, drama, translation, short story, novel	Jean Fabre (1904–1975)
35	Eyvind Johnson (1900–1976)	Sweden	novel, short story	Frédéric Durand (1920–2002); Carl-Eric Thors (1920–1986)
36	Marcel Jouhandeau (1888–1979)	France	short story, novel	Jean Gaulmier (1905–1997)
37	Yasunari Kawabata (1899–1972)	Japan	novel, short story	Henry Olsson (1896–1985)
38	Miroslav Krleža (1893–1981)	Yugoslavia	poetry, drama, short story, novel, essays	Association of Writers of Yugoslavia
39	Gertrud von Le Fort (1876–1971)	West Germany	novel, short story, essays, poetry	Friedrich von der Leyen (1873–1966)
40	Väinö Linna (1920–1992)	Finland	novel	Aarni Penttilä (1899–1971); Erik Lindegren (1910–1968); Elias Wessén (1889–1981)
41	Karl Löwith (1897–1973)	West Germany	philosophy	Franz Dirlmeier (1904–1977)
42	Salvador de Madariaga (1886–1978)	Spain	essays, history, law, novel	Jean Camp (1891–1968)
43	André Malraux (1901–1976)	France	novel, essays, literary criticism	Michel Décaudin (1919–2004); Yves Le Hir (1919–2005); Pierre Jonin (1912–1997); Léon Cellier (1911–1976)
44	Ramón Menéndez Pidal (1869–1968)	Spain	philology, history	Rudolf Großmann (1882–1941); Gunnar Tilander (1894–1973); A. Mas (–)
45	Yukio Mishima (1925–1970)	Japan	novel, short story, drama, literary criticism	Johannes Rahder (1898–1988)
46	Vilhelm Moberg (1898–1973)	Sweden	novel, drama, history	Gösta Bergman (1894–1984)
47	Henry de Montherlant (1895–1972)	France	essays, novel, drama	Louis Moulinier (1904–1971)
48	Alberto Moravia (1907–1990)	Italy	novel, literary criticism, essays, drama	Olof Brattö (1915–2007); Elias Wessén (1889–1981)
49	Stratis Myrivilis (1890–1969)	Greece	novel, short story	The Greek Authors' Union
50	Vladimir Nabokov (1899–1977)	Russia; United States	novel, short story, poetry, drama, translation, literary criticism, memoir	Robert Martin Adams (1915–1996)
51	Pablo Neruda (1904–1973)	Chile	poetry	Ragnar Josephson (1891–1966); Eyvind Johnson (1900–1976)
52	Junzaburō Nishiwaki (1894–1982)	Japan	poetry, literary criticism	Japan Academy
53	Seán O'Casey (1880–1964)	Ireland	drama, memoir	The English PEN-Club
54	Rudolf Pfeiffer (1889–1979)	West Germany	philology, essays	Will Richter (1910–1984)
55	Ezra Pound (1885–1972)	United States	poetry, essays	Rudolf Sühnel (1907–2007)
56	Vasco Pratolini (1931–1991)	Italy	novel, short story	Paul Renucci (1915–1976)
57	Henri Queffélec (1910–1992)	France	novel, short story, screenplay	Barthélémy-Antonin Taladoire (1907–1976)
58	Sarvepalli Radhakrishnan (1888–1975)	India	philosophy, essays, law	Suniti Kumar Chatterji (1890–1977); Arthur John Arberry (1905–1969)
59	Kate Roberts (1891–1985)	United Kingdom	novel, short story, essays	Idris Foster (1911–1984)
60	Jules Romains (1885–1972)	France	poetry, drama, screenplay	Gilbert Highet (1906–1978)
61	Nelly Sachs (1891–1970)	West Germany; Sweden	poetry, drama	Gerhard Heilfurth (1909–2006); Karl Ragnar Gierow (1904–1982)
62	Aksel Sandemose (1899–1965)	Denmark; Norway	novel, essays	Eyvind Johnson (1900–1976)
63	Jean-Paul Sartre (1905–1980)	France	philosophy, novel, drama, essays, screenplay	Lennart Breitholtz (1909–1998); Sergey Konovalov (1899–1982); Henry Bardon (1910–2003); Robert-Léon Wagner (1905–1982)
64	Giorgos Seferis (1900–1971)	Greece	poetry, memoir, essays	Eyvind Johnson (1900–1976)
65	Ramón José Sender (1901–1982)	Spain	novel, essays	Erik Lindegren (1910–1968)
66	Léopold Sédar Senghor (1906–2001)	Senegal	poetry, law, essays	Robert Schilling (1913–2004)
67	Ignazio Silone (1900–1978)	Italy	novel, short story, essays, drama	Elias Wessén (1889–1981)
68	Georges Simenon (1903–1989)	Belgium	novel, short story, memoir	Justin O'Brien (1906–1968)
69	Charles Percy Snow (1905–1980)	United Kingdom	novel, essays	Friedrich Schubel (1904–1991)
70	Mikhail Sholokhov (1905–1984)	Soviet Union	novel	Jack Posin (1900–1995)
71	Jun'ichirō Tanizaki (1886–1965)	Japan	novel, short story	Donald Keene (1922–2019)
72	Gustave Thibon (1903–2001)	France	philosophy	Édouard Delebecque (1910–1990)
73	Lionel Trilling (1905–1975)	United States	essays, literary criticism, short story	Charles Warren Everett (1895–1983)
74	Pietro Ubaldi (1886–1972)	Italy	philosophy, essays	Academia Santista de Letras
75	Mika Waltari (1908–1979)	Finland	short story, novel, poetry, drama, essays, screenplay	Aapeli Saarisalo (1896–1986)
76	Elias Venezis (1904–1973)	Greece	novel, short story	The Greek Authors' Union
77	Erico Verissimo (1905–1975)	Brazil	novel, short story, autobiography, essays, translation	Jean Roche (1901–1992)
78	Tarjei Vesaas (1897–1970)	Norway	poetry, novel	Sigmund Skard (1903–1995); Johannes Andreasson Dale (1898–1975)
79	Thornton Wilder (1897–1975)	United States	drama, novel, short story	Hans Peter Wapnewski (1922–2012); Arthur Henkel (1915–2005)
80	Edmund Wilson (1895–1972)	United States	essays, literary criticism, short story, drama	Joseph Anthony Mazzeo (1923–1998)
81	Yevgeny Yevtushenko (1932–2017)	Soviet Union	poetry, novel, short story, drama, screenplay, essays	Konrad Bittner (1890–1967)

=== Prize decision ===
The Nobel committee of the Swedish Academy was unanimous to propose that the prize should be awarded to Giorgos Seferis. Seferis was one of the final three candidates for the prize along with W.H. Auden and Pablo Neruda (awarded in 1971). The permanent secretary of the Swedish Academy and chairman of the Nobel committee Anders Österling felt "that there now was an opportunity to pay a beautiful tribute to modern Hellas, a language area that so far had been waiting too long [to be] honored in this context". The candidacies of Samuel Beckett (awarded in 1969) and Vladimir Nabokov were dismissed by Österling arguing that neither author lived up to the Nobel prize's "ideal intentions". Österling was also hesitant to award Pablo Neruda and the long time candidate Mikhail Sholokhov for political reasons, but both of them were subsequently awarded the prize. Nelly Sachs was nominated for the first time by committee member Karl Ragnar Gierow. While the committee felt that it was too early for her candidacy, Gierow proposed that the poet should be taken into consideration and Sachs was eventually awarded the prize in 1966.

== Award ceremony speech ==
At the award ceremony in Stockholm on 10 December 1963, Anders Österling, permanent secretary of the Swedish Academy, said in part:

Seferis’s poetic production is not large, but because of the uniqueness of its thought and style and the beauty of its language, it has become a lasting symbol of all that is indestructible in the Hellenic affirmation of life.[...] When reading Seferis we are forcibly reminded of a fact that is sometimes forgotten: geographically, Greece is not only a peninsula but also a world of water and foam, strewn with myriad islands, an ancient sea kingdom, the perilous and stormy home of the mariner.[...] Technically, Seferis has received vital impulses from T. S. Eliot, but underneath the tone is unmistakably his own, often carrying a broken echo of the music from an ancient Greek chorus.

== Banquet speech ==
In his speech at the Nobel prize banquet at Stockholm City Hall, Seferis thanked the Swedish Academy for paying homage to literature written in the Greek language and for honouring poetry:

I find it significant that Sweden wishes to honour not only this poetry, but poetry in general, even when it originates in a small people. For I think that poetry is necessary to this modern world in which we are afflicted by fear and disquiet. Poetry has its roots in human breath – and what would we be if our breath were diminished? Poetry is an act of confidence – and who knows whether our unease is not due to a lack of confidence?

== Nobel lecture ==
Giorgos Seferis delivered his Nobel lecture entitled Some Notes on Modern Greek Tradition on 11 December 1963.
