= GIUK gap =

Passages between the northern Atlantic Ocean and the Norwegian Sea

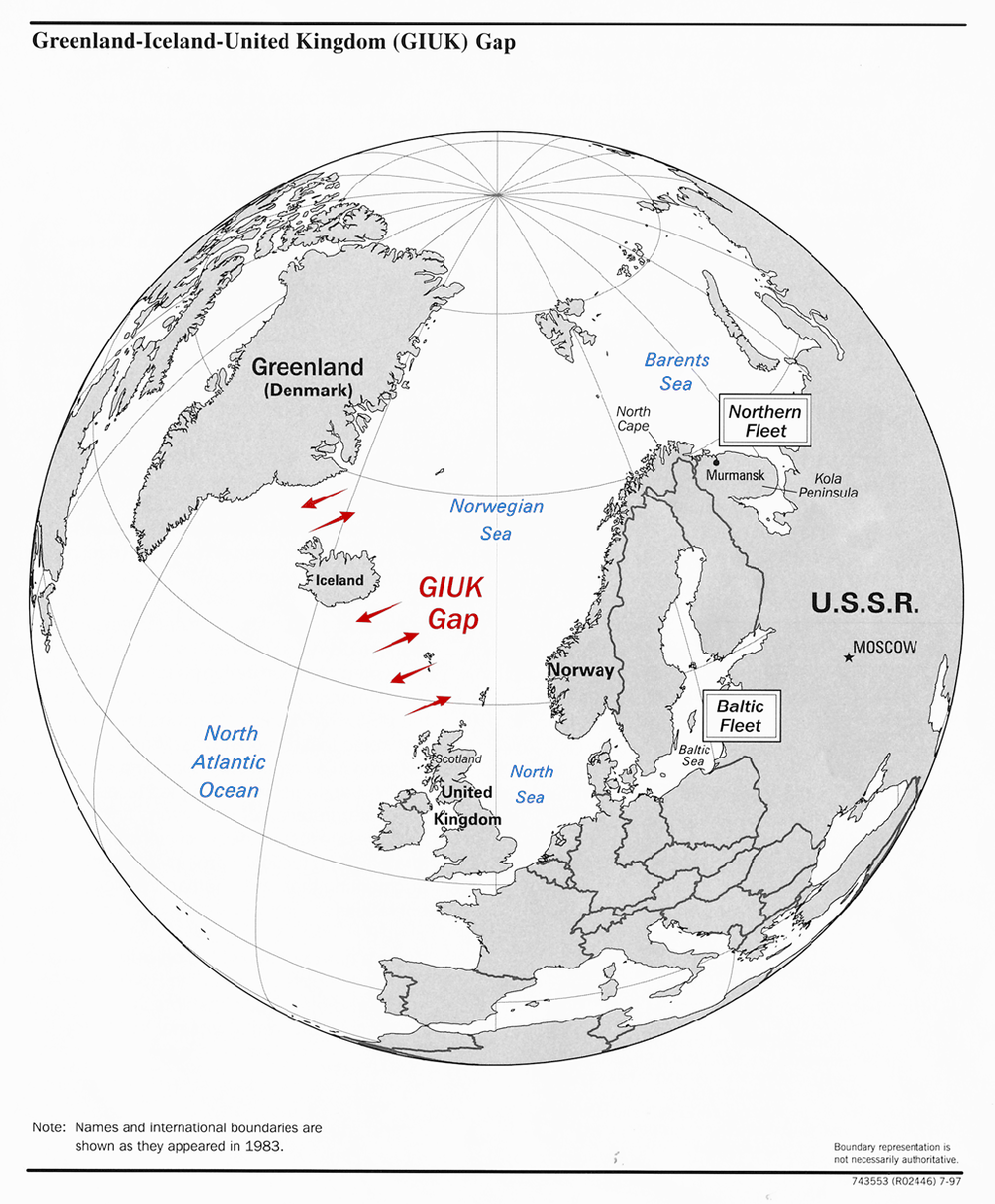
The GIUK gap in the North Atlantic (showing international boundaries as of 1983)

The GIUK gap (sometimes written G-I-UK) is an area in the northern Atlantic Ocean that forms a naval choke point. Its name is an initialism for Greenland, Iceland, and the United Kingdom, the gap being the two stretches of open ocean among these three landmasses. It separates the Norwegian Sea and the North Sea from the open Atlantic Ocean. The term is typically used in relation to military topics. The area has been considered strategically important since the beginning of the 20th century.

== History ==
Since the beginning of the 20th century, the exploitation of the GIUK gap by northern forces and measures to patrol and secure the gap by opposing forces have played an important role in naval and in overall military planning.

=== World War II ===
From the start of World War II in 1939, German ships used the gap to break out from their bases in northern Germany (and from occupied Norway after April 1940) with a view to attacking Allied shipping convoys, but Allied blocking efforts in the North Sea and in the GIUK gap impeded such break-outs. British forces occupied the Faroe Islands in April 1940, and Iceland in May 1940; the United States took over effective control of Greenland in 1940. But the German Kriegsmarine profited greatly from the fall of France in June 1940, after which German submarines could operate from bases on the French coast.

The origin of the term "gap" dates to this period, when there was a gap in air coverage known as the Mid-Atlantic gap or the "Greenland air gap". This gap was an area that land-based aircraft could not reach and where, as a result, they could not carry out their anti-submarine duties.

=== Cold War ===
The GIUK gap again became the focus of naval planning in the 1950s, as it represented the only available outlet into the Atlantic Ocean for Soviet submarines operating from their bases on the Kola Peninsula. NATO worried that if the Cold War "turned hot", naval convoys reinforcing Europe from the U.S. would suffer unacceptable losses if Soviet submarines could operate in the North Atlantic. The United States and the United Kingdom based much of their post-war naval strategy on blocking the gap, installing a chain of underwater listening posts right across it during the 1950s – an example of a SOSUS "sound surveillance system". This deployment of sonar surveillance in the gap, and elsewhere, hampered the Soviet Northern Fleet's ability to deploy its submarines without detection.

The Royal Navy's primary mission during the Cold War, excluding its nuclear deterrent role, involved anti-submarine warfare (ASW). The development of the Invincible-class ASW aircraft carriers stemmed from this doctrine: their primary mission involved anti-submarine warfare using Sea King helicopters. The Type 23 frigate originated as a pure ASW platform; its mission expanded following the Falklands War of 1982.

The largest Russian submarine drills through the GIUK gap were operations Aport and Atrina, in 1985 and 1987, respectively, when the Soviets deployed several nuclear-powered general-purpose attack submarines (SSNs) near the U.S. coast before the 1985 Gorbachev–Reagan meeting.

The Soviets planned to use the GIUK gap to intercept any NATO ships, especially aircraft carriers, heading towards the Soviet Union. Ships and submarines as well as Tupolev Tu-142 maritime-surveillance aircraft aimed to track any threatening ships.

The advent of longer-ranged Soviet submarine-launched ballistic missiles (SLBMs) allowed the Soviet Navy to deploy their ballistic missile submarine (SSBNs) within protected bastions in the Barents Sea and reduced their need to transit the GIUK gap. The much reduced, post-Cold War Russian Navy has even less need to transit the GIUK gap.

Crossing the GIUK gap was a major strategic move for Ocean Venture in 1992, in which 84 NATO ships, including 4 US aircraft carriers, departed from their usual August exercise pattern, deployed a decoy south toward the mid-Atlantic, and then entered waters in a move that had historically been associated with a risk of destabilizing détente.

=== Post-Cold War ===
In late October 2019, a week before Commander of the Northern Fleet Aleksandr Moiseyev and Russian Foreign Minister Sergey Lavrov met their Norwegian counterparts in Kirkenes, Norway, ten submarines of Russia's Northern Fleet, among them two diesel-electric and eight non-strategic nuclear, left their homebases in the Kola Peninsula to participate in submarine drills that were the largest, on the Russian side, since Cold War operations Aport and Atrina. The main task of the submarines was reportedly testing Russian ability to breach the GIUK gap undetected and sail into the Atlantic Ocean. The drills were expected to last up to two months.

== Significance to Denmark ==
Comprising Greenland, the Faroe Islands and Denmark, the Kingdom of Denmark is an Arctic state alongside seven other countries whose territories cover the Arctic region. All matters of foreign policy for both Greenland and the Faroe Islands fall within the jurisdiction of the Danish government.

The Danish government has historically used its jurisdiction over foreign policy in both Greenland and the Faroe Islands to assist in securing the GIUK gap and the wider Arctic for its allies. In doing so, Denmark has arguably acquired a sense of goodwill from particularly the US government and NATO. The Danish government views the Arctic as a central component of its foreign security policy and will continue to expand its spending, surveillance and military presence in the region.

Despite the relatively small-sized population of Denmark, roughly 6 million, the Danish government's close ties to Greenland and the Faroe Islands legitimises it as an inherently important Arctic actor on matters of geopolitical security and great-power tensions. Danish assertion of sovereignty in the GIUK gap and the wider Arctic is already a key concern to the Danish Realm and is expected to be an increasingly important component of Denmark's future responsibilities in NATO.

The GIUK gap is also a key supply line between the US and its European allies. With war on-going in Ukraine, NATO and the US are showing renewed interest in the GIUK gap, positioning Denmark to be a key player in matters of broader European security and increasing the gap's strategic importance to the Danish Realm.

=== Securing air and sea visibility in the GIUK gap ===
Until 2007, the Faroe Islands were home to an air surveillance radar station, providing vital radar coverage during the Cold War. In light of broader geopolitical changes, such as the Russian invasion of Ukraine, c. 2022, the station was undergoing preparations to be reopened, closing an important surveillance gap in the GIUK gap.

Maintaining thorough surveillance of the GIUK gap is crucial in order to ensure that sea lines of communication (SLOCs) and supply lines are uninterrupted between NATO's European members and the United States. Military bases, space bases, surveillance drones and radar installations in both Greenland and the Faroe Islands can help ensure proper visibility in the region, and assist in anti-submarine warfare (ASW) in case of actual conflict. In 2021, Denmark unveiled a $250 million investment in surveillance capabilities in Greenland and the Faroe Islands.

Responding to requests from NATO for Denmark to play its part in securing Arctic waters, Denmark is taking further steps to equip its ASW-frigates with sonar equipment, making them better equipped to detect and track submarines in the Arctic Ocean, and particularly in the GIUK gap. In addition, the Danish government is equipping its Seahawk helicopters with sonar equipment and torpedoes. The upgrades have yet to be delivered, however, with delivery projections estimating 2024 at the earliest.

=== Threats to critical seabed infrastructure ===
During the Cold War, Russia relied on the ability of its nuclear submarines to pass through the GIUK gap in order to ensure maximum military capability. The introduction of long-range precision strike weapons, however, have reduced the significance of the GIUK gap in relation to intercontinental attacks and made it possible for Russia to target North American sites from safer waters, such as the Norwegian Sea. Still, the GIUK gap remains the obvious access point for Russian military operations in the wider North Atlantic Ocean since most of Russia's highest quality naval capabilities are deployed in the Northern fleet, making the GIUK gap a significant transit route.

For NATO allies, the GIUK gap is vital in terms of barrier defense for sea lines of communication protection. SLOCs are vulnerable in the North Atlantic both in the gap and beyond, and the US and NATO rely on Denmark to assist in protecting this critical infrastructure, including the vast number of seabed data cables.

The Russian fleet has in recent years strategically upgraded its capabilities for covert subsea operations related to the targeting of seabed infrastructure and reports of Russian "mapping" of critical seabed infrastructure in the North Sea and the seabed around Denmark are increasing. NATO intelligence and security officials confirm these reports, warning that Russia has both the intent and necessary capabilities to target critical seabed installations if they so choose. While such infrastructure has always been associated with some risk, the dependency of Denmark and its allies on them are only increasing and is therefore posing a major threat in times of tension short of actual conflict.

== Significance to the United Kingdom ==
The GIUK gap is particularly important to the UK's Royal Navy, as any attempt by northern European forces to break into the open Atlantic would have to be made either through the heavily defended English Channel, one of the world's busiest seaways, or through one of the exits on either side of Iceland. As the British also control the strategic port of Gibraltar at the entrance to the Mediterranean, this means Spain, France, and Portugal are the only Continental European countries that possess direct access to the Atlantic Ocean that cannot easily be blocked at a choke point by the Royal Navy.

== Bird migration ==
The GIUK gap is also a route for migratory birds such as the northern wheatear to cross the Atlantic to reach Greenland and eastern Canada.

== In popular culture ==
- The 1960 British war film Sink the Bismarck! discusses the strategic importance of the GIUK gap during World War II naval operations in the Atlantic theatre, and depicts the Battle of the Denmark Strait between British and German forces. It is based on the novel The Last Nine Days of the Bismarck by C. S. Forester.
- The GIUK line is mentioned in the film The Bedford Incident.
- In Tom Clancy's first novel, The Hunt for Red October, the line was used to detect Soviet submarines entering the North Atlantic in pursuit of the rogue Typhoon-class submarine Red October, whose officers were defecting to the United States with clandestine stealth technology. The event causes significant political and military tension between the United States and the Soviet Union. The film adaptation also references the gap, with National Security Advisor Jeffrey Pelt (played by Richard Jordan) saying to the Soviet ambassador "Your aircraft have dropped enough sonar buoys so that a man could walk from Greenland to Iceland to Scotland without getting his feet wet."
- In Clancy's second novel, Red Storm Rising, the line is featured more prominently after a war breaks out between NATO and the Warsaw Pact. The Soviet Union launches a surprise attack on the NATO airbase NAS Keflavik and invades Iceland. This causes the line to be destroyed, creating a gap in NATO's surveillance and allowing the Soviet Navy to enter the North Atlantic. The subsequent Soviet submarine attacks and air raids cause serious damage to Merchant Marine ships and naval vessels in Atlantic convoys, hindering NATO's war effort during the defense against the less-successful Soviet invasion of West Germany.
- Early editions of the Harpoon naval warfare simulation were based around defending the GIUK Gap. Tom Clancy used the simulation to test the naval battles for Red Storm Rising.
- The location of Iceland in the gap made it a participant in the Cold War and a target for a nuclear strike, especially through the introduction of the aforementioned Keflavik atomic bomber NATO base. Halldór Laxness dramatized the tension of these geopolitics from the perspective of an Icelandic maid in the novel The Atom Station.

== See also ==
- Battle of the Denmark Strait – Naval battle during the Second World War
- Broad Fourteens – Area of the southern North Sea
- Communication with submarines – Submarine communication
- Long Forties – Zone of North Sea
- Mid-Atlantic gap – Area outside airplane range in World War II
- SOSUS – Cold War-era passive, fixed array undersea surveillance system
- Western Approaches – Region of northwestern Atlantic Ocean
- Luzon Strait – Strait between Luzon and Taiwan
- Strait of Malacca – Strait between the Malay Peninsula and the Indonesian island of Sumatra
- Strait of Gibraltar – Strait connecting the Atlantic to the Mediterranean
- Turkish Straits – Two waterways in Turkey

Land:

- Focșani Gate – Militarily and strategically important area in Romania and NATO
- Fulda Gap – Strategically important area in the Cold War
- Suwałki Gap – Lithuania–Poland border area
