= Biography of Halldór Laxness =

Icelandic biography

- Author: Hannes Hólmsteinn Gissurarson
- Original title: Ævisaga Halldórs Kiljans Laxness
- Language: Icelandic
- Subject: Halldór Laxness
- Genre: Biography
- Publisher: Almenna bókafélagið
- Publication date: 2003; 2004; 2005
- Publication place: Iceland

Biography of Halldór Laxness (Icelandic: Ævisaga Halldórs Kiljans Laxness) is an Icelandic biography of novelist and Nobel Laureate Halldór Laxness by Hannes Hólmsteinn Gissurarson. It was published in three volumes:

1. Halldór (2003)
2. Kiljan (2004)
3. Laxness (2005)

== Part I, Halldór ==
This volume is 620 pages long, including references and the index. The book was published by Almenna bókafélagið and is in Icelandic.

It covers the years 1902 to 1932; his first years as a child, his years in Menntaskólinn í Reykjavík, his first dictations from his works, his first travels to foreign countries and adventures there, his stay in the abbey, his relationships with other authors, his first four books and his stay in America.

== Part II, Kiljan ==
This part was published in 2004.

== Part III, Laxness ==
This part was published in 2005.
