= The Atom Station =

1955 novel by Halldór Laxness

- First edition
- Author: Halldór Laxness
- Original title: Atómstöðin
- Translator: Magnus Magnusson
- Language: Icelandic
- Genre: Novel
- Set in: Reykjavík, c. 1946/47
- Publisher: Helgafell
- Publication date: 21 March 1948
- Publication place: Iceland
- English publication date: 1961 (Methuen
- Media type: Print (Paperback)
- Pages: 276 (1948 first edition)
- OCLC: 3454358
- Dewey Decimal: 839.6934
- LC Class: PT7511 .L3

The Atom Station (Icelandic: Atómstöðin) is a novel by Icelandic author Halldór Laxness, who was awarded the Nobel Prize in Literature in 1955. The initial print run sold out on the day it was published, for the first time in Icelandic history.

== Plot summary ==
Ugla, an unrefined girl from the countryside, moves from an outlying area of northern Iceland to the capital city of Reykjavík in order to work for Búi Árland, a member of Iceland's national parliament, the Althingi, and to learn how to play the organ. She is met with a world that is completely foreign to her: politicians and the military move freely about the city, and she views city residents as spoiled, snobbish and arrogant. In contrast, she comes from a rural area where the Icelandic Sagas of the Middle Ages constitute the majority of what people discuss and ponder and are viewed as more important than reality. The prime minister subsequently carries out secret dealings with the Americans and sells them the rights to build a nuclear missile site. Ugla, however, also confronts other current issues, above all in the organ player's house. There, she comes in contact with communist and anarchist mindsets and likewise protests the construction of the missile site in Iceland. After a short relationship with Búi Árland, Ugla decides to return to the "self-conscious policeman", who is the father of her recently born child.

== Background ==
The Atom Station was written in 1946 and 1947 and published in 1948.

The setting of the novel was based on the British and subsequent American occupation of Iceland during World War II and on the urbanization and monetization of the Icelandic economy caused by this situation. Many people in Iceland thought Iceland's independence was threatened by the United States' request in 1946 to establish a military base in Keflavík for 99 years, as well as the pressure on Iceland to join NATO. Laxness thought that the occupation was a threat to Icelandic life because in the event of an atomic war Iceland would become a target due to the military base. He was also critical of the fact that Icelandic jurisdiction was not applicable to the area within the military base. These fears are based on the impression left by the two atomic bombs which had been recently dropped on Hiroshima and Nagasaki; Laxness began writing the novel shortly after these events. The Icelandic Parliament (the Althing) did finally agree to the United States' requests, provoking the 1949 anti-NATO riot in Iceland.

While many of the characters in the novel can be understood as satires of real figures in Icelandic business and politics (or otherwise modeled on Laxness's friends and acquaintances), the work is too sophisticated simply to be read as a roman à clef. According to Laxness's biographer Hannes Hólmsteinn Gissurarson:

- One model for the main character, Ugla, was Arnheiður Sigurðardóttir.
- The Organist was inspired primarily by Laxness's friends Erlendur Guðmundsson í Unuhúsi (to whom the book is dedicated) and Þórður Sigtryggsson.
- The main models for Búi Árland would mainly be Guðmundur Vilhjálmsson, the chairman of Eimskip, and Pálmi Hannesson, rector of Menntaskólinn í Reykjavík.
- The Prime Minister is based on Ólafur Thors (and the novel, amongst other things, a transparent attack on Ólafur).
- Landaljómi is based on Thor Vilhjálmsson.
- The god Briljantín is based on Ragnar Frímann Kristjánsson
- Kleópatra's model is Guðmunda Sigurðardóttir.
- Tvö hundruð þúsund naglbítar (Two Hundred Thousand Pliers) is a combination of Sigurjón Pétursson and Jóhann Þ. Jósefsson.

== Reception ==
First English-language edition

Early Icelandic reviewers read the book primarily as a satire on the politics of the day; it has traditionally been seen as one of Laxness's weaker works, though it has long been read as Iceland's first urban novel, foreshadowing the prominence of Reykjavík in more recent literature. However, more recent critics have seen it as offering more enduring theological, philosophical and political commentary: Giuliano D'Amico, for example, argues that 'neither with the Americans nor with the Soviets, the characters of Atómstöðin seem to advocate for a "Third Europe" that ... resembles the "third space" articulated by postcolonial theory'.

Laxness endured political persecution for the novel: the Alþingi withdrew his state writer's stipend; he was prosecuted for describing an abortion; and 'Icelandic and American authorities even started investigating his periods of residence in America, with the hope of finding some fiscal irregularities and ruining him'. He also struggled to get the novel translated.

== Influence and adaptations ==
Atómstöðin has been characterised as 'what many readers and critics gradually came to think of as the exemplary Reykjavík novel', focusing on urban Icelandic life for the first time.

Laxness dubbed one of his characters, benjamín, an atómskáld ('atom-poet'), as a derogatory reference to modernist poets. The name came to be applied to a real group of poets, the Atom Poets.

The book was adapted as a film by Þorsteinn Jónsson in 1984. Through the film, the book has been seen to have continued resonances in twenty-first-century Iceland: 'the powerful imagery is coincidentally linked to the 2009 protests ... following the Icelandic banking crisis'.

== See also ==
- GIUK gap

== Sources ==
- Friese, Wilhelm (1995). Halldór Laxness. Die Romane. Eine Einführung. Beiträge zur nordischen Philologie. Vol. 24. Basel: Helbing und Lichtenhahn. pp. 67–77. ISBN 978-3-7190-1376-9.
- Keel, Aldo (1981). Innovation und Restauration. Der Romancier Halldór Laxness seit dem Zweiten Weltkrieg. Beiträge zur nordischen Philologie. Vol. 10. Basel: Helbing und Lichtenhahn. pp. 8–65. ISBN 978-3-7190-0791-1.
- Sønderholm, Erik (1981). Halldór Laxness. En monografi. København: Gyldendal. pp. 229–243. ISBN 978-87-00-53102-4.
