= Hugh Borton =

American historian (1903–1995)

8th President of Haverford College
- In office 1957–1967
- Preceded by: Gilbert White
- Succeeded by: John Royston Coleman

Personal details
- Born: May 14, 1903 Moorestown, New Jersey, U.S.
- Died: September 6, 1995 (aged 92) Conway, Massachusetts, U.S.
- Spouse: Elizabeth Wilbur
- Education: Haverford College
- Occupation: Historian

Hugh Borton (May 14, 1903 – August 6, 1995) was an American historian who specialized in the history of Japan, later serving as president of Haverford College.

== Biography ==
Borton was born on May 14, 1903, to a devout Quaker household in Moorestown Township, New Jersey. His parents sent him to Quaker schools and after graduating from Haverford College in 1927, he and his wife Elizabeth Wilbur, proceeded to find a way of making a living that was in line with their Quaker beliefs. They looked to the American Friends Service Committee, which set up teaching posts for them at a small school in the foothills of the Tennessee’s Great Smoky Mountains. In 1928 Borton and his wife were asked to travel to Tokyo, Japan, to help the committee's work there.

Borton's three years living among the Japanese affected his outlook to the extent that he thereafter devoted himself to studying Japan. Initially, Borton sought guidance from Sir George Sansom, a British scholar who was then serving in the British Consulate. In 1931, Borton returned to America to further his education. He completed a master's degree in history at Columbia University and studied briefly at Harvard University. He then traveled across the Atlantic to pursue further study under the supervision of Professors J. J. L. Duyvendak and Johannes Rahder at Leiden University in the Netherlands. He was awarded his PhD by Leiden after several years of work at Tokyo Imperial University. He returned to the United States to take a position on the faculty at Columbia, lecturing on modern Japanese history and language. He also played a key role in structuring the first undergraduate program in Japanese studies in the newly expanded Department of Chinese and Japanese. His research publications prior to the Second World War included Peasant Uprisings in Japan of the Tokugawa Period and Japan Since 1931: Its Political and Social Development.

Borton's academic career was interrupted by America's entry into the Second World War following the Japanese attack on Pearl Harbor, diverting him into public service. Borton cited his Quaker principles in conscientiously objecting to serving in the armed forces, but he was interested in doing what he could to prepare for the peace after the war. In June 1942 he sought leave from Columbia to spend the summer serving on the faculty of the School of Military Government at the University of Virginia at Charlottesville. In the fall he moved to the US State Department. It marked the beginning of six years during which he was in the midst of a corps of officials who focused not on the military advancement of the war, but in preparing peacetime measures not focused on punishing Japan, but on reforming it so that a similar war would be less likely to occur. Borton drafted many of the State Department proposals and was a proponent of many of its positions, including those that resulted in key decisions such as the decision not to prosecute Emperor Hirohito as a war criminal and the decision to not replace the Japanese government but to disband the Japanese military and replace the wartime leadership. His group also sought to implement fundamental reform of the Japanese constitution.

In 1948 Borton returned to academic life at Columbia, where he was a prominent organizer of the East Asian Institute as the university's centre of modern and contemporary East Asian studies. He replaced the inaugural director, Sir George Sansom, and later helped to establish the Association for Asian Studies, serving as its first treasurer and later as its president. Among his works were Japan Under Allied Occupation, 1945–1947 and Japan's Modern Century, which went on to become one of the most widely used history texts of his period.

In 1957, Borton resigned his post at Columbia to accept an appointment to Haverford College as its president, before retiring in 1967. In 1972 he retired to his farm in the Berkshire Hills of Massachusetts to enjoy the farm life which he loved and to practice his Quaker faith. Borton died on August 6, 1995, at the age of 92 at his home in Conway, Massachusetts.

== Honors ==
- Japan Foundation: Japan Foundation Award, 1980.

== Books ==
- Peasant Uprising in Japan (1938)
- Japan Since 1931: Its Political and Social Developments (1940)
- Japan's Modern Century From Perry to 1970 (1956)
- Borton, Hugh (2002). Spanning Japan's Modern Century: The Memoirs of Hugh Borton. Lanham, Md.: Lexington Books. ISBN 978-0-7391-0391-3.

Academic offices
Preceded by Gilbert F. White	President of Haverford College; 1957–1967	Succeeded by John R. Coleman
