= Hulda (poet) =

Icelandic poet (1881–1946)

Unnur Benediktsdóttir Bjarklind (1881–1946) who wrote as Hulda (the fairy or hidden one) was an Icelandic poet and prose writer. A proponent of symbolism, she was the most prominent figure in a group of writers who revived and revitalized the þulur genre of oral litany.

Having a librarian as a father Hulda received an extensive home education. She studied English, German and French as well as the Scandinavian languages, granting her access to the works of European writers. Among Icelandic poets she admired the rural poetry of Eggert Ólafsson and the lyrical quality of Benedikt Gröndal's works. She began contributing poems to periodicals at the age of twenty and was quickly discovered by Einar Benediktsson and Þorsteinn Erlingsson, who hailed her as a star of neo-romanticism. Her first volume of poetry, Kvæði (Poems; 1909) consists of lyrical nature poetry, contrasting the neo-romantic dream of freedom with the virtues of hard work while some metaphors suggest the oppressed condition of women. Despite delicate health and the duties of a housewife, Hulda was a prolific writer, publishing seven volumes of poetry, the last appearing posthumously in 1951. One of her best known works is a patriotic poem written to celebrate the establishment of the Icelandic Republic in 1944.

Hulda wrote more than ten volumes of prose; fairy tales, short stories and sketches as well as the two-volume novel, Dalafólk (People of the Valleys). She wrote the novel as a reaction to Independent People by Halldór Laxness. In contrast to Laxness' bleak view of rural life in Iceland, Hulda presents a somewhat idealized picture of the old manorlike farmsteads.
