= Raufarhöfn =

- Village
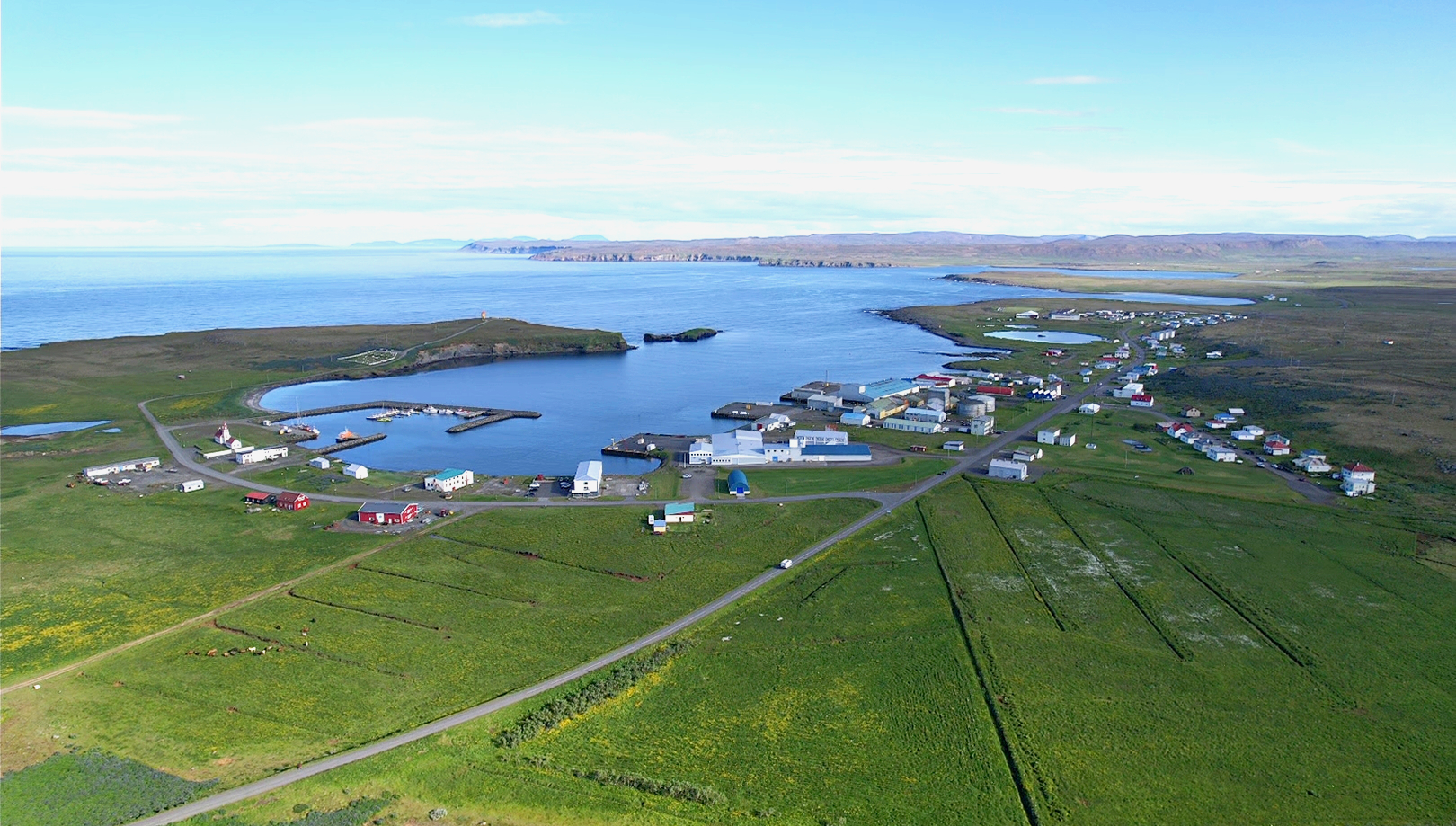
- Raufarhöfn seen from the air

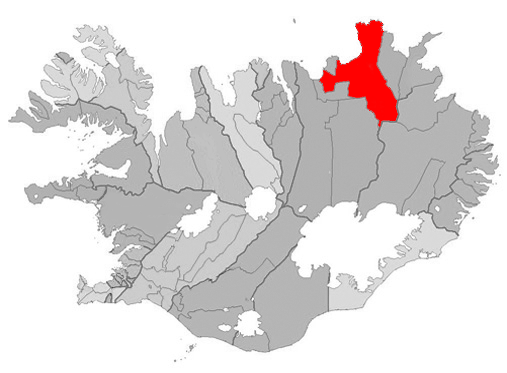
- Location of the Municipality of Norðurþing

- Location of Raufarhöfn in Iceland
- Coordinates: 66°27′15″N 15°57′00″W
- Country: Iceland
- Constituency: Northeast Constituency
- Region: Northeastern Region
- Municipality: Norðurþing

Population (2019)
  - Total: 188
- Time zone: UTC+0 (GMT)

Raufarhöfn (Icelandic pronunciation: [ˈrœyːvarˌhœpn̥]) is a village located on the northeastern tip of the Melrakkaslétta [ˈmɛlˌrahkaˌstljɛhta] peninsula in Iceland.

== History ==
At one point in time, this small village was home to largest export harbor in Iceland. In the forties and fifties, the herring frenzy dominated the Icelandic economy and Raufarhöfn was an important place in that economic chain. But after the herring were fished out, the effect was devastating for the village. As of 2019, it had 188 inhabitants.

The village is also the site of a modern monument called the "Arctic Henge" which is aligned to the heavens and is inspired by the mythical world of the Eddic poem Völuspá (Prophecy of the Seeress).

== Sights ==
The church was built in 1928 by Guðjón Samúelsson, one of the most important Icelandic architects, and inaugurated on 1 January 1929. It was renovated in 1979. Circa 1996, a large stone monument, "Arctic Henge" (Heimskautsgerði [ˈheimˌskœytsˌcɛrðɪ] in Icelandic), was constructed close to the village. Inspired by historic stone circles as of 2021 the site is still under construction.

== Geography and climate ==
Raufarhöfn village

The climate is tundra (Koppen: ET). As the northernmost community of mainland Iceland, Raufarhöfn is also the coldest with an annual average of 2.7 °C (36.9 °F).

Climate data for Raufarhöfn, 1981–2010 normals, extremes 1949–2009
Month	Jan	Feb	Mar	Apr	May	Jun	Jul	Aug	Sep	Oct	Nov	Dec	Year
Record high °C (°F)	11.0 (51.8)	11.0 (51.8)	12.7 (54.9)	20.4 (68.7)	25.0 (77.0)	24.5 (76.1)	25.2 (77.4)	24.8 (76.6)	22.0 (71.6)	17.2 (63.0)	14.8 (58.6)	14.2 (57.6)	25.2 (77.4)
Mean daily maximum °C (°F)	1.2 (34.2)	1.1 (34.0)	1.3 (34.3)	3.2 (37.8)	6.2 (43.2)	9.6 (49.3)	11.7 (53.1)	11.7 (53.1)	9.0 (48.2)	5.1 (41.2)	2.6 (36.7)	1.7 (35.1)	5.4 (41.7)
Daily mean °C (°F)	−1.4 (29.5)	−1.5 (29.3)	−1.3 (29.7)	0.4 (32.7)	3.4 (38.1)	6.6 (43.9)	8.7 (47.7)	8.8 (47.8)	6.2 (43.2)	2.8 (37.0)	0.3 (32.5)	−0.9 (30.4)	2.7 (36.9)
Mean daily minimum °C (°F)	−4.4 (24.1)	−4.3 (24.3)	−4.0 (24.8)	−2.1 (28.2)	0.9 (33.6)	4.1 (39.4)	6.4 (43.5)	6.3 (43.3)	3.7 (38.7)	0.5 (32.9)	−2.4 (27.7)	−3.9 (25.0)	-0.0 (32.0)
Record low °C (°F)	−21.5 (−6.7)	−21.2 (−6.2)	−24.6 (−12.3)	−21.8 (−7.2)	−16.0 (3.2)	−3.7 (25.3)	−2.3 (27.9)	−2.2 (28.0)	−8.5 (16.7)	−12.0 (10.4)	−17.9 (−0.2)	−17.9 (−0.2)	−24.6 (−12.3)
Average precipitation mm (inches)	73.1 (2.88)	57.4 (2.26)	65.7 (2.59)	44.5 (1.75)	33.9 (1.33)	35.4 (1.39)	48.9 (1.93)	53.1 (2.09)	68.0 (2.68)	89.4 (3.52)	78.4 (3.09)	64.2 (2.53)	714.7 (28.14)
Average precipitation days (≥ 1.0 mm)	14.6	11.3	13.4	9.7	7.9	7.0	9.0	10.1	12.5	15.7	13.9	13.3	138.4
Average snowy days (≥ 0 cm)	16.4	15.2	18.1	9.8	0.9	0.0	0.0	0.0	0.1	2.0	8.1	14.7	85.3
Average relative humidity (%)	79.0	78.6	78.4	79.9	83.7	85.6	88.2	88.4	87.0	85.5	81.2	79.2	82.9
Average dew point °C (°F)	−4.6 (23.7)	−4.7 (23.5)	−4.5 (23.9)	−2.7 (27.1)	0.6 (33.1)	3.9 (39.0)	6.5 (43.7)	6.6 (43.9)	3.7 (38.7)	0.4 (32.7)	−2.4 (27.7)	−4.1 (24.6)	−0.2 (31.6)
Mean monthly sunshine hours	5.2	25.7	47.5	75.7	108.2	113.5	96.2	90.2	57.7	31.6	9.5	0.1	661.1
Source 1: NOAA (humidity 1961-1990)
Source 2: Iceland Met Office (sun 1961-1990 and extremes)

== Transport ==
Raufarhöfn Airport is located approximately 5 km (3.1 mi) south of the village.

== See also ==
- Hraunhafnartangi Lighthouse
