= Operation Atrina =

1987 Soviet Navy submarine operation

Operation Atrina was a 1987 Soviet Navy submarine operation, during which five Victor-III class boats - K-244, K-255, K-298, K-299 and K-524 - were deployed from Zapadnaya Litsa base to the Atlantic shore of North America.

The March to May 1987 operation involved taking a longer path around Greenland instead of the usual route via GIUK gap to avoid SOSUS. Developments in Soviet submarine technology - related, among other things, to spy activity - further complicated the detection.

Atrina remains a highly debated topic in Cold War history - while Soviet and Russian authors raise it to an almost mythical status, Western sources claim complex yet successful tracking of at least four boats.

Multiple media in both Russia and West made connections between Atrina and 2019 Operation Grom, saying the latter was a Russian attempt to break into Atlantics under disguise of Russian Northern Fleet naval training
