= Gerpla =

1952 literary work by Halldór Laxness

Gerpla is a 1952 Icelandic novel by Halldór Laxness based on the Old Icelandic Fóstbræðra saga.

== Translations ==
- 1954. Gerpla. Translated by Ingegerd Nyberg Fries. Stockholm: Litteraturfrämjandet.
- 1958. Kjempeliv i nord. Translated by Ivar Eskeland. Oslo: Tiden norsk forlag
- 1958. The Happy Warriors. Translated by Katherine John. London: Methuen.
- 1962. Gerpla: Hrdinská sága. Translated by Nina Neklanová. Jiskry: Nová beletristická knihovna 37. Prague: Nakladatelství politické literatury.
- 1977. Gerpla: Eine Heldensage. Translated by Bruno Kress. Berlin: Aufbau.
- 1988. Gerpla: Sága o hrdinoch. Translated by Jaroslav Kaňa. Bratislava: Slovenský spisovateľ.
- 2016. Wayward Heroes. Translated by Philip Roughton. New York: Archipelago Books.
