= Iceland's Bell (novel) =

Historical novel

- 1943 edition
- Author: Halldór Laxness
- Original title: Íslandsklukkan
- Language: Icelandic
- Genre: Historical fiction
- Publisher: Helgafell
- Publication date: 1943–1946
- Publication place: Iceland
- Pages: 436
- ISBN: 978-9-979-22530-0

Iceland's Bell (Icelandic: Íslandsklukkan) is a historical novel by Nobel Prize-winning Icelandic author Halldór Kiljan Laxness. It was published in three parts: Iceland's Bell (1943), The Bright Jewel or The Fair Maiden (1944) and Fire in Copenhagen (1946). The novel takes place in the 18th century, mostly in Iceland and Denmark. Like many of Laxness's works, the story paints a tragic and ironic picture of the terrible state of the Icelandic populace in the 18th century.

== Plot summary ==
=== Part 1 – Iceland's Bell ===
The first part tells the story of the farmer Jón Hreggviðsson and his battle with the Icelandic authorities. Jón is sentenced to death for the murder of an executioner, an official of the King of Denmark, but manages to flee from Iceland to Denmark, where he hopes to get an interview with the King to persuade him to grant a pardon.

=== Part 2 – The Bright Jewel or The Fair Maiden ===
Snæfríður Íslandssól (lit. "Snow-Beautiful Iceland's-Sun") is the protagonist in the second part. She is in love with a collector of manuscripts named Arnas Arnaeus but is married to a drunkard. This character is based on an actual historical figure, Thordis Jónsdóttir, who was the daughter of the bishop of Hólar and was widely considered at the time to be the most beautiful woman in southern Iceland. Her husband, squire Magnús Sigurðsson, was wealthy and well-fed, as well as a violent alcoholic.

=== Part 3 – Fire in Copenhagen ===
The third part is about Arnas Arnaeus the manuscript-collector and the fate of his collection in Copenhagen. In the end, Arnas does not marry the woman of his heart, Snæfríður, but stays with his rich Danish wife who financed his life's work.

== Background ==
The character Arnas Arnæus is based on Árni Magnússon (1663-1730), an Icelandic scholar who collected and preserved a great deal of medieval manuscripts. The Icelandic painter Jóhannes Kjarval depicts the "cutting down the bell" scene from Íslandsklukkan in a painting of the same title that currently hangs in the Kjarvalstadir museum, in Reykjavík.
