= Sergey Alimpiev =

Soviet-Russian musician (1958–2005)

Sergey Alimpiev Сергей Алимпиев HAR
- Alimpiev as Mr X

Background information
- Born: Sergey Viktorovich Alimpiev; 22 September 1958; Rasskazovo, Tambov Oblast, RSFSR, USSR
- Died: 18 December 2005 (aged 47) Moscow, Russia
- Occupations: Singer, actor
- Years active: 1984—2005

Sergey Viktorovich Alimpiev (Russian: Сергей Викторович Алимпиев; September 22, 1958, Rasskazovo, Tambov Oblast — December 18, 2005, Moscow) was a Soviet and Russian operetta artist, soloist of Moscow Operetta Theater in 1984, Honored Artist of Russia (1998).

== Biography ==
He graduated from the Russian State Institute of Performing Arts with a degree in Actor of Musical Theater.

In 1990, together with the speaker of the Soviet Central Television Marina Burtseva was the host of the Yalta's Vocal Competition.

He executed the leading roles in Kalman's operetta operas, The Grand Duchess of Gerolstein by Offenbach, The Grooms by Isaac Dunaevsky, Strauss's Die Fledermaus, Lehar's Merry Widow.

He was sick with AIDS. The disease struck the singer literally in a year, and he had to be hospitalized. He died in December 2005 from hepatitis.
