= Erlendur Guðmundsson í Unuhúsi =

Erlendur Guðmundsson í Unuhúsi (born May 31, 1892 in Mjóstræti, Reykjavik; died February 13, 1947) was an Icelandic intellectual.

== Biography ==
Erlendur's father was Guðmundur Jónsson from Brún in Svartárdalur in Húnavatnssýsla, and his mother was Una Gísladóttir, born in Stóru-Giljá in Húnaþing. He grew up and spent the rest of his life living in Unuhús, Garðastræti 15, and thus was always known as Erlendur Guðmundsson í Unuhúsi ('Erlendur Guðmundsson in Una's house').

Una was noted for taking in lodgers and renting out rooms; after her death in 1924, Erlendur kept up the tradition. She and her son were very interested in the arts and culture, and Unuhús was known as a central point in Icelandic cultural life in the earlier twentieth century, associated with free-thinkers, radicals, and communists. Young poets and artists as well as a number of others stayed there, including Stefán frá Hvítadal, Steinn Steinarr, Halldór Laxness, Þórbergur Þórðarson, Louisa Matthíasdóttir and Nína Tryggvadóttir.

== Influence ==
Iceland's foremost writers have competed to praise Erlendur in their works. Þórbergur wrote about Erlendur in his book Í Unuhúsi (1962), following the accounts of Stefán frá Hvítadal. In Þórbergur's obituary for Erlendur, he wrote: "Erlendur was a man of such rare intelligence and fine qualities that I doubt that in the whole history of Icelanders might meet ten people who were his equal". One could go so far as to say that Þórbergur owed Erlendur and Una his life, because in the rigningasumarið mikla ('great rainy summer') of 1920, Þorbergur nearly starved, and they took him in.

Erlendur's outlook was famous, and Laxness compared him with Jesus Christ. In his 1978 memoir Sjömeistarasagan, he said of Erlendur: "Then I was no judge of character if this was not the Saviour himself, moreover one cut out from a bible-picture in the 'Jesus heart style', except that he did not wear his heart on his sleeve". Stefán frá Hvítadal said that Erlendur had always been the first person he showed a new poem to and that he trusted his judgment on literary material better than the opinion of others.

== Archive ==
Erlendur's main archive is held by the National Library of Iceland.
