= Guðni Jónsson =

Icelandic historian (1901–1974)

Guðni Jónsson (22 July 1901 – 4 March 1974) was an Icelandic professor of history and editor of Old Norse texts.

== Life and career ==
Guðni was born at Gamla-Hraun at Eyrarbakki into a poor family who had a total of 17 children. He was raised by relatives at Leirubakki until he was twelve, worked two seasons as a fisherman and then was taken in by his married sister in Reykjavík, enabling him to attend evening school there. He received a middle school certificate in Flensburg in 1921 and a school certificate from Menntaskólinn í Reykjavík in 1924. In 1923 he served as president of the student society Framtíðin. He then attended the University of Iceland, first in theology and then in the faculty of Old Norse studies. He completed a master's degree in Icelandic studies in 1930 with a thesis on Landnámabók, comparing the manuscripts with each other and with other texts. His doctoral thesis, published in 1952, was in genealogy and history: Bólstaðir og búendur í Stokkseyrarhreppi.

He began a career as a teacher at a primary school in the Vestmannaeyjar in winter 1926–27, taught evening school himself in Reykjavík in 1927–28, taught at the Commercial College of Iceland in 1928–29, and then taught at Reykvíking Middle School from 1928 until 1945, when he became headmaster. In 1957 he became professor of history at the university, and held that position until 1967, when he had a stroke. He died on 4 March 1974.

== Personal life ==
He was married twice: his first wife, Jónína Margrét Pálsdóttir, whom he married in 1926, died in 1936 and two years later he married Sigríður Hjördís Einarsdóttir. He had five children from his first marriage, one of whom died young, and four from his second.

== Publications ==
Guðni Jónsson published extensively in history and genealogy, including Bergsætt, Saga Hraunshverfis á Eyrarbakka and Stokkseyringa saga. He also published histories of the Flensburg school (1932), the Eimskipafélag Íslands shipping company (1939) and the University of Iceland (1961). He edited the works of Brynjúlfur Jónsson and several other popular writers and published twelve volumes of popular histories and legends, Íslenzkir sagnaþættir og þjóðsögur, in 1940–57 and two volumes of Skyggni, studies of Icelandic folklore, in 1960 and 1962.

He made an important contribution to the availability of Old Norse works. With Bjarni Vilhjálmsson he edited the Fornaldarsögur Norðurlanda (3 volumes, 1943–44), then on his own, volumes 1 to 12 of the complete Sagas of Icelanders, which were published in 1946–47 and included some material that had not been readily available before. He completed this edition with an index of names published in 1949, and continued until 1957 to publish editions of other texts, some of which, such as the Bishops' sagas, had only been previously available in 19th-century editions.
