= Hraunhafnartangi Lighthouse =

Lighthouse in Iceland

Hraunhafnartangi lighthouse
- Location: Reykjanes peninsula
- Coordinates: 66.536178°N 16.026050°W

Tower
- Constructed: 1951
- Construction: concrete tower
- Height: 19 metres (62 ft)
- Shape: square tower with balcony and lantern
- Markings: white tower, red lantern, apparent double vertical black stripes

Light
- First lit: 1951
- Focal height: 21 metres (69 ft)
- Characteristic: Fl (2) WR 30 s
- Iceland no.: VIT-192

Hraunhafnartangi Lighthouse (Icelandic: Hraunhafnartangaviti [ˈr̥œynˌhapnarˌtʰauŋkaˌvɪːtɪ], regionally also [-ˌvɪːtʰɪ]) is the northernmost lighthouse in Iceland. It is located about 800 meters south of the Arctic Circle.

== Location and description ==
The lighthouse is on the northeast coast of Iceland, about 10 km northwest of the town of Raufarhöfn, the northernmost town in Iceland. The light tower is square, 19 metres tall and built of concrete. The lantern house is painted red.

== Light characteristic ==
The light characteristic is a long and a short flash every 30 seconds. The flash is white or red depending on the direction from the lighthouse.

== See also ==
- List of lighthouses in Iceland
