= Constance Holme =

English writer

Edith Constance Holme (7 October 1880 – 17 June 1955), married name Punchard, was an English writer and playwright. She was born in Milnthorpe, Westmorland (now in Cumbria), the youngest of fourteen children. Her novels are set in the old county of Westmorland, where she lived most of her life.

Many of Holme's works explore class relationships; her first two books focus on the three-way relationships between landowners, tenant farmers and land agents (Holme's father and her husband were both land agents).

Uniquely among living twentieth-century authors, all of Holme's novels and her book of short stories were published in the Oxford World's Classics series. The Lonely Plough was also, in 1936, among the first novels published by Penguin. Despite this, her reputation faded quickly after her death; indeed, it had been questioned even during her own lifetime, with The Saturday Review commenting in 1938, "We are still hunting for someone who has actually read Constance Holme's novels." Some of her books were reprinted during the 1970s; however, her final work, The Jasper Sea, remains unpublished.

== Published works ==
- Crump Folk Going Home (1913)
- The Lonely Plough (1914)
- The Old Road from Spain (1916)
  - US title: The Homecoming (Robert M. McBride, April 1916)‡
- Beautiful End (1918)
- The Splendid Fairing (1919)
- The Trumpet in the Dust (1921)
- The Things Which Belong (1925)
- He-Who-Came? (1930)
- Four One-Act Plays (1932)
- The Wisdom of the Simple and Other Stories (1937)

== Notes ==
‡Internet Archive and HathiTrust provide full digital copies of The Homecoming, published April 1916. The University of California copy at HathiTrust includes the original front cover. The Stanford University copy at Internet Archive includes the title page signed by Holme. Retrieved 2018-09-10.
