= The Great Weaver from Kashmir =

1927 novel by Halldór Laxness

- 1927 edition
- Author: Halldór Laxness
- Original title: Vefarinn mikli frá Kasmír
- Translator: Philip Roughton
- Language: Icelandic
- Set in: Iceland
- Published: 1927
- Publication place: Iceland
- English publication date: 2008

The Great Weaver from Kashmir (Icelandic: Vefarinn mikli frá Kasmír) is the third novel by Halldór Laxness, published in 1927 by the Reykjavík publisher Forlagið. The theme of the work is a young man's soul and search for truth, faith and love, and his choice between love and faith. It is particularly noted as the seminal modernist novel in Icelandic.

== Plot ==
The novel is divided into eight books and one hundred chapters; the number of the chapters echoes the number of cantos in Dante's Divine Comedy, and it too 'records its young protagonist's own heaven, hell, and purgatory'.

Book 1 introduces us to the family of Valgerður Ylfingamóðir and Elliði: their sons Örnólfur and Grímúlfur, Grímúlfur's wife Jófríður, and their own son Steinn Elliði.

Book 2 is largely a series of epistolatory monologues by Steinn's childhood friend and sweetheart Diljá Þorsteinsdóttir, and his mother Jófríður, exploring their dependence on Steinn and their frustrations with life.

Book 3 follows Steinn's travels in Continental Europe and Britain in 1921–25, and his grappling with Christian theology.

Book 4, which is mostly third-person narrative, explores Diljá's ultimately unhappy marriage to Örnólfur.

Book 5 continues to follow Steinn's travels in Europe and Egypt, and his soul-searching.

Book 6 sees Steinn desperately seeking spiritual meaning by entering a Benedictine monastery at Sept Fontaines in Francophone Belgium. In the end, however, he decides not to take holy orders and to return to Iceland.

Book 7 recounts Steinn's return to Iceland, where he discovers Diljá's marriage to Örnólfur and fails to find satisfaction among his family in Reykjavík. It is again dominated by third-person narrative.

Book 8 sees Steinn returning to a monastic life in Continental Europe. Diljá, who has parted from Örnólfur, pursues him, and meets him in Rome. Steinn rejects her, and the novel closes with the image of Diljá abandoned in Rome.

== Style ==
The novel to a large extent is an epistolatory novel, comprising letters and sometimes literary works (both prose and verse) or monologues by its characters. It is littered with untranslated epigraphs and quotations by characters of material in other European languages. The modernist narrative mode was characterised by Peter Hallberg as 'very consistently' implying 'an abrupt break with the native Icelandic tradition of narrative art. The story is freely subjective; its rhythm varies like an unstable temperature curve. The principal character, the young Icelandic poet Steinn Elliði, who shares many essential experiences with his author, engages the reader in a whirl of often paradoxical and conflicting ideas.'

== Reviews ==
The Great Weaver from Kashmir had diverse effects on readers when it came out. Two critics are the most famous. Kristján Albertsson wrote a review of ten pages that appeared in the magazine Vaka the same year as the book was published. It opened thus:

Loksins, loksins tilkomumikið skáldverk, sem ris eins og hamraborg upp úr flatneskju íslenzkrar ljóða- og sagnagerðar síðustu ára! Ísland hefir eignazt nýtt stórskáld — það er blátt áfram skylda vor að viðurkenna það með fögnuði. Halldór K. Laxness hefir ritað þessa sögu á 24. aldursári sínu. Ég efast um að það komi fyrir einu sinni á aldarfjórðungi að skáld á þeim aldri semji jafn snjallt verk og þessi saga hans er. Á 64. gráðu norðlægrar breiddar hefir það aldrei fyr gerzt.

At last, at last, an impressive literary work, that rises like a cliff-city from the flatness of Icelandic poetry- and narrative-production in recent years! Iceland has begotten a new great writer — it is our duty to acknowledge it with joy. Halldór K. Laxness has written this story in the 24th year of his life. I doubt that it will happen once in a quarter of a century that a poet of that age makes an equally ingenious work as this story of his is. At a 64 degree north latitude this has never been done.

However, Kristjan's judgment is not all of one character, and he also says that the work is "no masterpiece", "in some places contrived, fake, unscrewed, its metaphors tasteless or ugly" ("ekkert meistaraverk", "sumstaðar tilgerðarlegt, falskt, forskrúfað, líkingar bragðlausar eða ófagrar"), but it continues: "the development of today's Icelandic narrative style takes half a century's jump with this book of H. K. L." (Þróun tímaborins íslenzks sögustíls tekur hálfrar aldar stökk með þessari bók H.K.L.").

In the same paper was a review by Gudmundur Finnbogason, which was far shorter, and runs as follows: "Vélstrokkað tilberasmjör. G. F.". Hard to translate, this means something like 'machine-churned witch-butter'.

== English translation ==
- Halldór Laxness, The Great Weaver From Kashmir, trans. by Philip Roughton (Brooklyn, NY: Archipelago, 2008).
