= The Fish Can Sing =

1957 novel by Halldór Laxness

- Author: Halldór Laxness
- Language: Icelandic
- Set in: Iceland
- Published: 1957

The Fish Can Sing (Icelandic: Brekkukotsannáll) is a 1957 novel by Icelandic author Halldór Laxness, who was awarded the Nobel Prize in Literature in 1955.

== Plot summary ==
The novel is set at the start of the twentieth century and deals with the orphaned boy Álfgrímur, his adoptive grandparents, and the small, tolerant community of misfits and eccentrics they gather around them at Brekkukot, their cottage in Reykjavík. As Álfgrímur begins to encounter the minor politicians, businessmen and social-climbers of the growing town of Reykjavík he starts to question his future as a fisherman's grandson, and is increasingly fascinated by Garðar Hólm, the celebrated Icelandic "world singer" whose sporadic returns to Iceland encourage Álfgrímur to pursue his own personal goals of self-expression. He discovers the true value of his boyhood experiences only as he sets out on a path that will take him away from them forever.

== Trivia ==
The boy's name, Álfgrímur, is explained in the book as a compound of Álf (elf) and grímur (a poetic word for 'night') meaning 'he who spends the night with the elves'. The original name of the book in Icelandic is Brekkukotsannáll (Annals of Brekkukot). The book also had an admirable young lady named Blær, which is why Björk Eiðsdóttir chose this name for her daughter born in 1997, although it was officially a masculine name. In 2013, Björk and Blær won a court case for the right to use this name—see also Icelandic Naming Committee#Blær Bjarkardóttir Rúnarsdóttir

== Translations ==
- The book was translated into Georgian as თევზის კონცერტი (Tevzis k'ontsert'i) by Rusudan Ghvinepadse and Manana Paitchadse.
