= Independent People =

Novel by Halldór Laxness (1934, 1935)

- First edition (volume 1)
- Author: Halldór Laxness
- Original title: Sjálfstætt fólk
- Translator: J. A. Thompson
- Language: Icelandic
- Genre: Novel
- Publisher: Vintage Books
- Publication date: 1934 (Part I), 1935 (Part II)
- Publication place: Iceland
- English publication date: 1946
- Media type: Print (Paperback)
- Pages: 544 pp (first English edition)
- ISBN: 0-679-76792-4
- OCLC: 34967984
- Dewey Decimal: 839/.6934 20
- LC Class: PT7511.L3 S52313 1997

Independent People: An Epic (Icelandic: Sjálfstætt fólk) is a novel by Nobel laureate Halldór Laxness, originally published in two volumes in 1934 and 1935. It deals with the struggle of poor Icelandic farmers in the early 20th century, only freed from debt bondage in the last generation, and surviving on isolated crofts in an inhospitable landscape.

The novel is considered among the foremost examples of social realism in Icelandic fiction in the 1930s. It is an indictment of materialism, the cost of the self-reliant spirit to relationships, and capitalism itself. This book, along with several other major novels, helped Halldór win the Nobel Prize in Literature in 1955.

== Plot summary ==
Independent People is the story of the sheep farmer Guðbjartur Jónsson, generally known in the novel as Bjartur of Summerhouses, and his struggle for independence. As the story begins, Bjartur ("bright" or "fair") has recently managed to put down the first payment on his own farm, after eighteen years working as a shepherd at Útirauðsmýri, the home of the well-to-do local bailiff, a man he detests. The land that he buys is said to be cursed by Saint Columba, referred to as "the fiend Kolumkilli", and haunted by an evil woman named Gunnvör, who made a pact with Kólumkilli. The novel charts the drudgery and the battle for survival of life in Summerhouses, the misery, dreams and rebellions of the inhabitants, and what appears to be the curse of Summerhouses taking effect.

Bjartur is newly married to a young woman called Rósa, a fellow worker at Rauðsmýri, and is determined that they should live as independent people. However, Rósa is miserable in her new home, which does not compare well to the luxury she was used to at Rauðsmýri. Bjartur also discovers that she is pregnant by Ingólfur Arnarson Jónsson, the son of the bailiff. In the autumn, Bjartur and the other men of the district ride up into the mountains on the annual sheep round-up, leaving Rósa behind with a ewe to keep her company. Terrified by a storm one night, desperate for meat, and convinced that the gimmer is possessed by the devil, Rósa kills and eats the animal.

When Bjartur returns, he assumes that Rósa has set the animal loose. When he cannot find her when it comes time to put the sheep inside for the winter, he once more leaves his wife, by now heavily pregnant, to search the mountains for the gimmer. He is delayed by a blizzard, and nearly dies of exposure. On his return to Summerhouses he finds that Rósa has died in childbirth. His dog Titla is curled around the baby girl, still clinging to life due to the warmth of the dog. With help from Rauðsmýri, the child survives; Bjartur decides to raise her as his daughter, and names her Ásta Sóllilja ("beloved sun lily").

The narrative begins again almost thirteen years later. Bjartur is now remarried to a woman who had been a charity case in the parish, Finna. The other new inhabitants are Hallbera, Finna's mother, and the three surviving sons of Bjartur's second marriage: Helgi, Gvendur (Guðmundur) and Nonni (Jón). Most of the pregnancies are stillborn. The family lives in hardship but the arrival of a cow makes everyone in the family but Bjartur happy, especially Finna who develops a strong bond to the animal and takes it on walks. It is later found out that the cow is a gift from the Women's Institute. Bjartur refuses to accept the gift and pays them back.

The family faces a harsh winter that kills several sheep. Bjartur refuses to ask for help and borrow hay from other farmers or from Rauðsmýri. Bjartur kills the feeble family cow and Finna dies shortly thereafter. Afterwards a mysterious ghost starts killing sheep. The countrymen gather at the croft to pray. It is later found out that it was Helgi, who then flees his house. His body is found later in the book by Bjartur.

Bjartur travels to Vik to work as hired labor but sends the Teacher to the croft to give the children an education. The Teacher is sick with consumption and seems also to be addicted to a stimulant drug. One night he rapes Ásta, who becomes pregnant as a consequence, and is banished from Summerhouses by Bjartur for this reason.

Bjartur allows Nonni to leave for America. Some years after Nonni sends Gvendur money to come as well. On the day of his departure Gvendur chases a village girl, and misses his ship to America. He becomes infatuated and decides to buy a horse with his money. The girl later turns out to be a daughter of Ingólfur Arnarson Jónsson. When he meets her again, she is not impressed, and Gvendur ends up staying and working with Bjartur at Summerhouses.

In the middle of the novel, World War I commences and the prices for Icelandic mutton and wool soar, so that even the poorest farmers begin to dream of relief from their poverty. Since Bjartur profits from the war, he takes a loan in order to build a new house. The build quality ends up being poor, and after the war ends he is unable to pay his loan. Summerhouses ends up being sold by the bank and Bjartur and Gvendur leave Summerhouses to go to Hallbera's land. On the way they meet a group of socialist strikers. Bjartur disagrees with them, but Gvendur stays and ultimately leaves his father as did his brothers. In the end, Bjartur reunites with Ásta Sóllilja who is now a mother of two children, has tuberculosis, and will likely die soon.

== Themes ==
The most important theme of the novel is independence, what it means and what it is worth giving up in order to achieve it. Bjartur is a stubborn man, often callous to the point of cruelty in his refusal to swerve from his ideals. Though undoubtedly a principled man, his attitude leads to the death and alienation of those around him.

There are strong economic themes, a discussion of the co-operative movement in Iceland and the exploitation of crofters like Bjartur by Danish merchants and rich Icelanders like Jón the Bailiff.

Independent People also reveals Halldór's anti-war leanings in a chapter that depicts Icelandic farmers sitting around talking about the economic benefits of the Great War.

The novel depicts elements from ancient Icelandic sagas and Icelandic folklore as part of the daily lives of its characters. Each of the character's imaginations and self-narratives are inhabited by elves, ghosts, and demons from folklore. The character of Bjartur is also portrayed as a talented poet, a living embodiment of the great oral tradition of the sagas.

"The author's ironical appraisal is already expressed in the title of the novel, and also in the titles of some of the chapters ... : "Free of Debt", "Years of Prosperity"."

== Reaction ==
The popular Icelandic poet Hulda wrote the two-volume novel, Dalafólk (People of the Valleys) as a reaction to Independent People. In contrast to Halldór's bleak view of rural life in Iceland, Hulda presents a somewhat idealized picture of the old manorlike farmsteads.

In her review of the 1997 Vintage International reissue of the English translation of the novel, Annie Dillard wrote, "The greatest Scandinavians' work shows opposing strains of lyricism and naturalism... Independent People fits the dual bill: it is a mythic tale -- cum Marx."
