= Hannes Hólmsteinn Gissurarson =

Icelandic philosopher (born 1953)

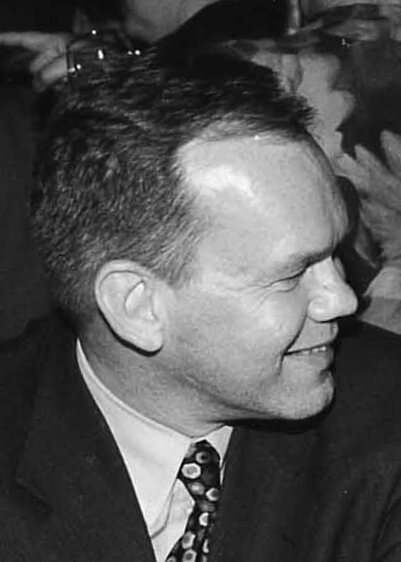
- Born: February 19, 1953 (age 73); Reykjavík, Iceland
- Education: University of Iceland, University of Oxford
- Occupations: Author, professor
- Writing career
- Language: Icelandic, English, Portuguese
- Subjects: Economy, politics
- Website: hannesgi.blog.is/blog/hannesgi

Hannes Hólmsteinn Gissurarson (born February 19, 1953, in Reykjavík, Iceland) is a professor emeritus of political science at the University of Iceland and a frequent commentator on current affairs in the Icelandic media. He is best known as a staunch spokesman for free market policies, and for neoliberalism or classical liberalism, as well as for his frequent climate change denial.

== Education and career ==
Hannes was born in Reykjavík, Iceland. Graduating from the Reykjavík Grammar School in 1972, Hannes completed his B.A. in philosophy and history and his M.A. in history from the University of Iceland, before going on to study politics at the University of Oxford, where he received his DPhil in 1985 for a thesis on "Hayek's Conservative Liberalism". At Oxford, he was in 1984-1985 the R. G. Collingwood Scholar at Pembroke College; and he founded, with some like-minded friends, the Oxford Hayek Society. From 1988, Hannes has taught at the University of Iceland, becoming professor of political theory in the Faculty of Social Science in 1995. In 1984, he became a member of the Mont Pelerin Society, serving on its board of directors in 1998–2004. He was also a member of the board of the Central Bank of Iceland 2001–2009. He has been a visiting scholar at the Hoover Institution, Stanford University, UCLA, George Mason University in Virginia, Tokyo University of the Fisheries, LUISS in Rome and International Centre for Economic Research, in Turin. He has twice been a Fulbright Scholar in the U.S. and once a Sasakawa Scholar in Japan. In 2005, Hannes organised a regional meeting of the Mont Pelerin Society in Iceland, devoted to "Freedom and Property in the 21st century". Since 2012, he has been the academic director of RNH, The Icelandic Research Centre for Innovation and Growth, a free-market think tank in Reykjavik. Since 2020, he has been a columnist for The Conservative, an online magazine published by ECR, European Conservatives and Reformists.

== Influence ==
In 1984, from October 2 to 10, Hannes, with Kjartan Gunnarsson, operated an illegal radio station, to protest against the government monopoly of broadcasting. Police eventually closed the station down. Hannes and Kjartan were indicted and fined for breaking the law on broadcasting. But the operation of the station and its closure turned many in the leadership of the Independence Party towards supporting the abolition of the government monopoly. The Icelandic parliament abolished the monopoly in 1985, and the law came into effect in 1986.

In early 1990, Hannes published a book on fisheries management, an important subject in Iceland whose main export is fish. It was entitled The Fish Stocks in the Icelandic Waters: The Property of the Nation or of the State? Hannes advocated a system of individual, transferable quotas, ITQs, in the Icelandic fisheries, where initially the quotas would be given free of charge to the owners of fishing vessels, in order to gain their support for what was tantamount to the enclosure of the Icelandic fishing grounds. The leadership of the Independence Party also supported the ITQ system. The Independence Party held the Ministry of Fisheries 1991–2009.

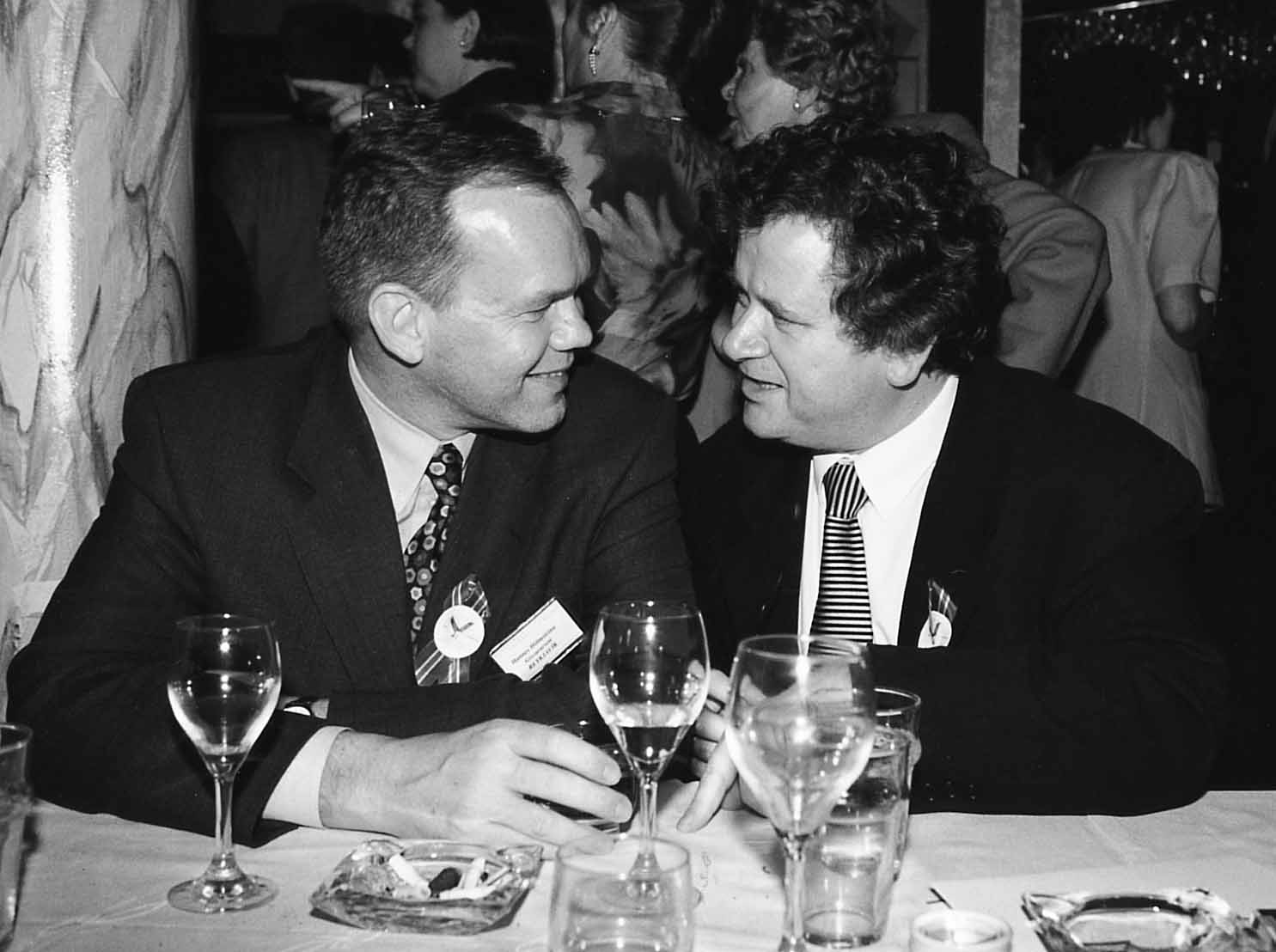
Hannes Hólmsteinn Gissurarson and Davíð Oddsson at the 1996 general meeting of the Independence Party

In 2002, Hannes published a book titled How Can Iceland Become the Richest Country in the World? suggesting that Iceland could become an international financial centre offering low corporate taxes and a stable political environment. He named, as precedents, Luxembourg and Ireland – two other small European countries— and small islands, such as the Channel Islands, the Isle of Man and the Caymans.

The corporate incomes tax in Iceland has already been lowered in the 1990s from 50% to 18%, and the net wealth tax had been abolished. The free-market reforms under the reign of the Independence Party 1991–2004 were comprehensive, not only consisting in tax reductions, but also in privatization, liberalization and stabilization. Enjoying access to the European financial market because of Iceland's membership of the EEA and also enjoying the high credit ratings for Icelandic companies earned in the 1991–2004 period, the Icelandic banks could expand rapidly, especially in the period after 2004. In the 2008 international financial crisis, the Icelandic Central Bank, since 2005 under the governorship of Davíð Oddsson, was refused credit lines from the US and Europe, with the result that the banks collapsed. It was argued that the Icelandic bank collapse was also a collapse of the neo-liberal model imposed on Iceland by Hannes and Davíð Oddsson. Hannes, however, pretends that the Icelandic banks were subject to the same legal and regulatory framework as other banks in the EEA, and that their rapid credit expansion mostly took place after 2004.

== Views on climate change ==
Hannes is a noted and vocal climate change denier, having at various points denied both that global warming is happening and humanity's effect on global climate. He is a critic of Swedish climate activist Greta Thunberg, opining in a Tweet in 2019: "Greta Thunberg says that she speaks for coming generations. What have coming generations done for us? Nothing. What have we done for coming generations? Everything."

== Main writings ==
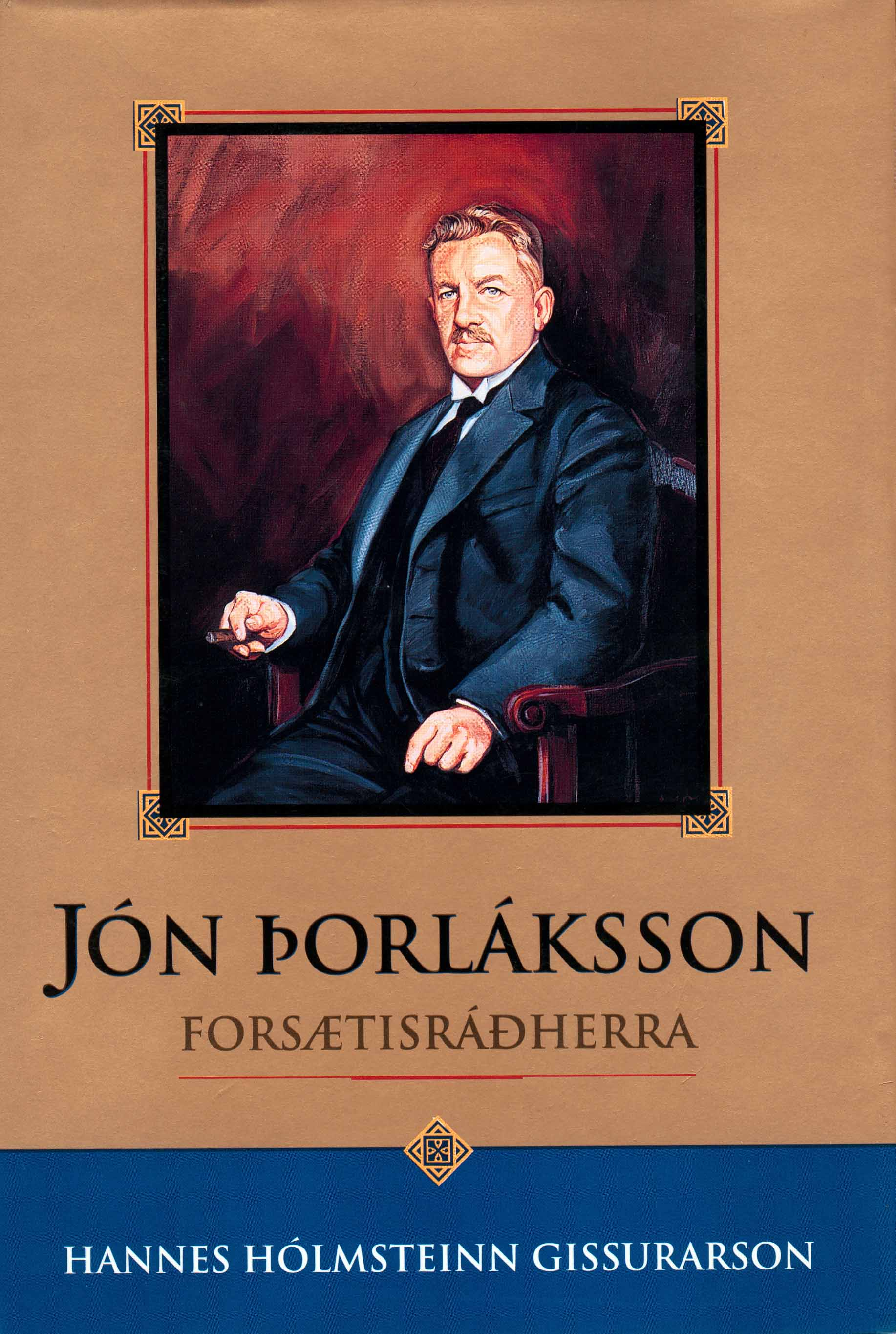
Cover of Hannes' biography of Prime Minister Jón Þorláksson (1992)

- Hayek's Conservative Liberalism (doctoral thesis, in English). Garland, New York 1987.
- Sjálfstæðisflokkurinn í sextíu ár (The Independence Party in Sixty Years). Sjálfstæðisflokkurinn, Reykjavík 1989.
- Fjölmiðlar nútímans (The Modern Media). Stofnun Jóns Þorlákssonar, Reykjavík 1989.
- Island (Iceland, in Swedish). Timbro, Stockholm 1990.
- Fiskistofnarnir við Ísland: Þjóðareign eða ríkiseign? (The Fish Stocks in the Icelandic Waters: The Property of the Nation or of the State?) Stofnun Jóns Þorlákssonar, Reykjavík 1990.
- Jón Þorláksson forsætisráðherra (Prime Minister Jón Þorláksson, a biography). Almenna bókafélagið, Reykjavík 1992.
- Frjálshyggjan er mannúðarstefna, Greinasafn (Libertarianism is Humanitarianism. Collection of Essays). Stofnun Jóns Þorlákssonar, Reykjavík 1992.
- Pálmi í Hagkaup (Pálmi in Hagkaup, a short biography). Framtíðarsýn, Reykjavík 1994.
- Hvar á maðurinn heima? (Where does Man Belong? Essays in the history of political ideas). Hið íslenska bókmenntafélag, Reykjavík 1994.
- Íslenskar tilvitnanir (Dictionary of Quotations). Almenna bókafélagið, Reykjavík 1995.
- Benjamín Eiríksson í stormum sinna tíða (Benjamín Eiríksson, a biography). Bókafélagið, Reykjavík 1996
- Hádegisverðurinn er aldrei ókeypis (There Ain't No Such Thing as a Free Lunch). Hið íslenska bókmenntafélag, Reykjavík 1997.
- Stjórnmálaheimspeki (Political Philosophy). Hið íslenska bókmenntafélag, Reykjavík 1999.
- Ísland og Atlantshafsbandalagið. Þrír heimildaþættir fyrir sjónvarp (Iceland in NATO. script for three television documentaries). 1999.
- Overfishing. The Icelandic Solution. Institute of Economic Affairs, London 2000.
- Fiskar undir steini. Sex ritgerðir í stjórnmálaheimspeki (Twists in the Tales. Essays in political philosophy). Háskólaútgáfan, Reykjavík 2001.
- Hvernig getur Ísland orðið ríkasta land í heimi? (How Can Iceland Become the Richest Country in the World?) Nýja bókafélagið, Reykjavík 2002.
- Tuttugasta öldin. Átta heimildaþættir fyrir sjónvarp (The Twentieth Century, script for eight television documentaries). 2002 (co-author).
- Halldór. Fyrsta bindi ævisögu Halldórs Kiljans Laxness (Halldór, first volume of a biography of Halldór Kiljan Laxness). Almenna bókafélagið, Reykjavík 2003.
- Kiljan. Annað bindi ævisögu Halldórs Kiljans Laxness (Kiljan, second volume of a biography of Halldór Kiljan Laxness). Bókafélagið, Reykjavík 2004.
- Laxness. Þriðja bindi ævisögu Halldórs Kiljans Laxness (Laxness, third volume of a biography of Halldór Kiljan Laxness). Bókafélagið, Reykjavík 2005.
- Davíð Oddsson í myndum og máli (A pictorial biography of Davíð Oddsson). Samband ungra sjálfstæðismanna (Federation of Young Independents), Reykjavík 2008.
- Áhrif skattahækkana á hagvöxt og lífskjör (The Impact of Tax Raises on Economic Growth and Living Standards). Bókafélagið, Reykjavík 2009.
- Kjarni málsins. Fleyg orð á íslensku (An Icelandic dictionary of quotations). Bókafélagið, Reykjavík 2010.
- Íslenskir kommúnistar 1918–1998 (Icelandic communists 1918–1998). Almenna bókafélagið, Reykjavík 2011.
- The Icelandic Fisheries: Sustainable and Profitable. Háskólaútgáfan (University of Iceland Press), Reykjavík 2015.
- The Nordic Models. New Direction, Brussels 2016.
- In Defence of Small Nations. New Direction, Brussels 2016.
- Voices of the Victims: Towards a Historiography of Anti-Communist Literature. New Direction, Brussels 2017.
- Lessons for Europe from the 2008 Icelandic Bank Collapse. New Direction, Brussels 2017.
- Green Capitalism: How to Protect the Environment by Defining Private Property Rights. New Direction, Brussels 2017.
- Liberalism in Iceland in the Nineteenth and Twentieth Centuries, Econ Watch Journal, Vol. 14, No. 2 (2017), pp. 241–273.
- Anti-Liberal Narratives About Iceland, 1991–2017, Econ Watch Journal, Vol. 14, No. 3 (2017), pp. 362–398.
- Icelandic Liberalism and Its Critics: A Rejoinder to Stefan Olafsson, Econ Watch Journal, Vol. 15, No. 3 (2018), pp. 322–350.
- Totalitarianism in Europe: Three Case Studies. ACRE, Brussels 2018.
- Why Conservatives Should Support the Free Market New Direction, Brussels 2018.
- Spending Other People’s Money: A Critique of Rawls, Piketty, and Other Redistributionists. New Direction, Brussels 2018.
- Foreign Factors in the 2008 Icelandic Bank Collapse Report to the Icelandic Ministry of Finance and Economic Affairs, Reykjavik 2018.
- Nordic Pioneers of Liberal Thought: Snorri Sturluson, Svensk Tidskrift 1 November 2019.
- Nordic Pioneers of Liberal Thought: Anders Chydenius, Svensk Tidskrift 8 November 2019.
- Redistribution in Theory and Practice: A Critique of Rawls and Piketty Journal des Économistes et des Études Humaines, Vol. 25, No. 1, 29 November 2019.
- Twenty-Four Conservative-Liberal Thinkers, Part One New Direction, Brussels 2020.
- Twenty-Four Conservative-Liberal Thinkers, Part Two New Direction, Brussels 2020.
- Communism in Iceland, 1918–1998 Social Science Research Institute at the University of Iceland, Reykjavik 2021.
