= Hraunhafnartangi =

Headland in northeastern Iceland

Coordinates: 66.5360°N 16.0253°W

Map of Hraunhafnartangi

Hraunhafnartangi (Icelandic pronunciation: [ˈr̥œynˌhapnarˌtʰauɲcɪ], lit. 'Lava Harbor Ness') is the second northernmost point of mainland Iceland and was believed to be the northernmost point until 2016 when it lost that title to the close by Rifstangi which was found to exceed it by 68 metres. It is notable for the Hraunhafnartangi Lighthouse.
