= Sergei Sergeyev-Tsensky =

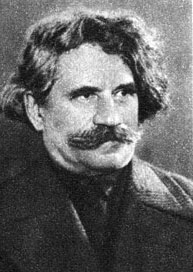
- Born: Sergei Nikolayevich Sergeyev; 30 September [O.S. 18 September] 1875; Preobrazhenskoye, Rasskazovsky District, Tambov Governorate, Russian Empire
- Died: December 3, 1958 (aged 83); Alushta, Crimean Oblast, Soviet Union
- Occupations: Writer, academician
- Writing career
- Years active: 1900–1958
- Genres: Short stories, novels
- Notable work: Russia's Transfiguration
- Movement: Modernism

Sergei Nikolayevich Sergeyev-Tsensky (Russian: Серге́й Николаевич Сергеев-Ценский, 30 September [O.S. 18 September] 1875 – December 3, 1958) was a prolific Russian and Soviet writer and academician.

== Early life ==
Sergei Sergeyev was born on 30 September [O.S. 18 September] 1875, in the village of Preobrazhenskoye, Rasskazovsky District, Tambov Governorate. His father was a teacher and a retired veteran of the Crimean War of 1853–1856. At four, Sergeyev learned how to read and at five he already knew by heart many poems by Pushkin and Lermontov, as well as Krylov's fables, beginning to write his own poems at seven. At this time, his family had moved to Tambov where Sergei's father received a post in the government.

During his stay in the city of Tambov, Sergeyev enrolled in preparatory education course at the Yekaterininsky Teachers' Institute in Tambov. However, after the death of his parents in 1891, he could no longer continue his course and earned a living by teaching private lessons. In 1892, the future writer entered the Glukhov Teachers' Institute (Chernigov province) at the expense of the state, from which he graduated with honors in 1895.

In 1904, the Russo-Japanese War broke out and he was drafted into the Army. He served in Kherson and Odesa before being placed under house arrest and discharged from the army for political activities in 1905. He had spoken out against the pogroms in Simferopol in 1905, testifying in a court inquiry about the role of the police and army in these pogroms.

== Career ==
He published his first works in 1898, and his first book Thoughts and Dreams in 1901. The latter contained poems with strong civic undertones.

In 1907, he published the novel Babayev, where he described revolutionary events in a provincial town. It was reportedly "later discovered that the story of the officer hero of the novel was actually the author's own experience in the revolution."

During World War I, the author was again drafted into the army, but was put into the reserve because of his age. Little was heard from the writer during World War I and the following Russian Civil War with lean times forcing Sergeyev to sell off his possessions for food. A story goes that a neighbor who helped him milk a newly acquired cow soon became his wife, Khristina – a college graduate and a gifted pianist.

The author turned to historical subjects in 1923, but with the new Soviet authorities, it became harder to write freely on any topic. With the rise of Maxim Gorky, however, who admired Sergeyev, things gradually improved. According to the opinion of Sergei Sossinsky, although "Sergeyev-Tsensky does not belong to Russia's top classical authors, he might have [been] if he had not had the misfortune of living half his life under Communist rule."

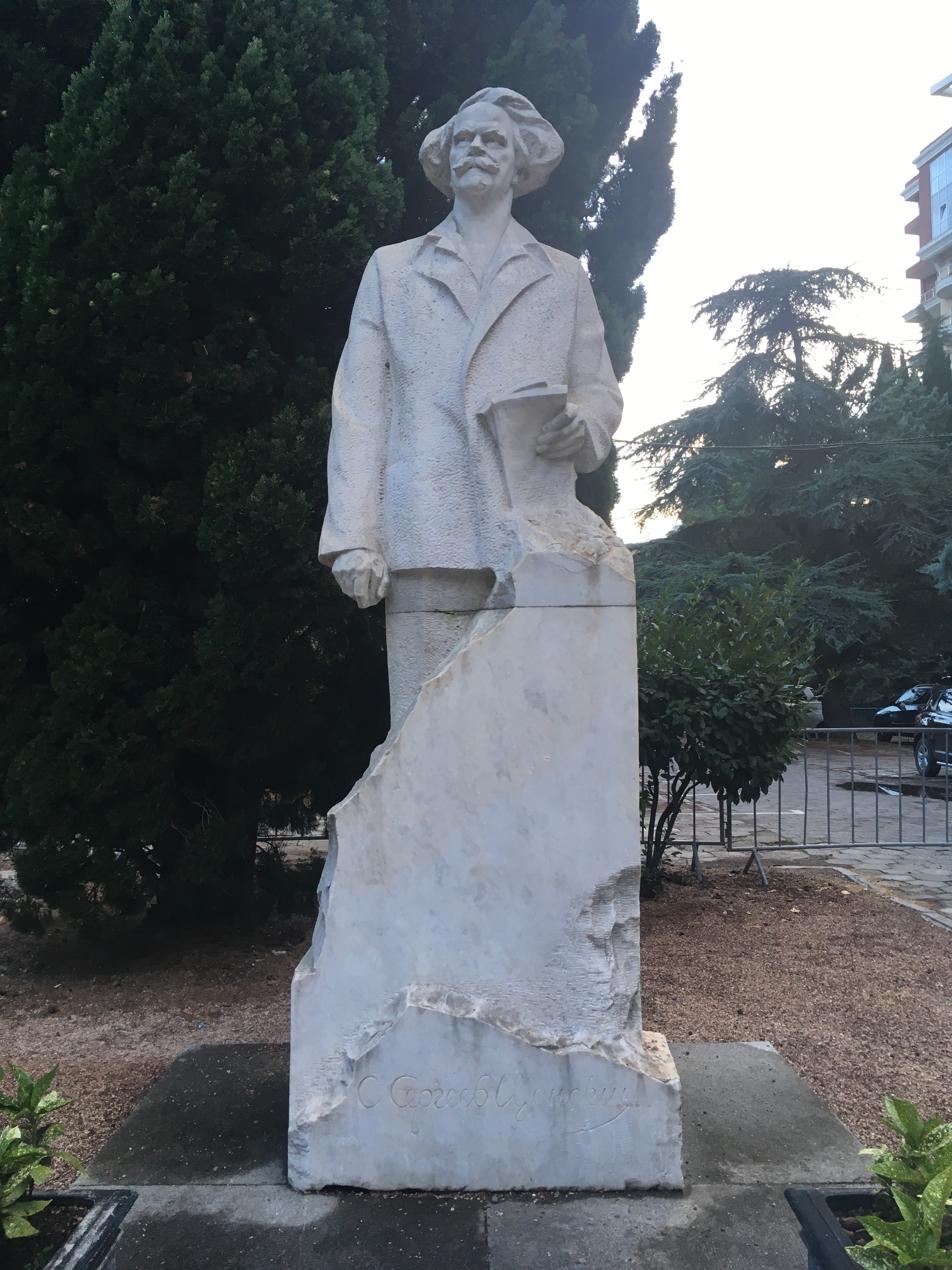
Monument to Sergei Sergeyev-Tsensky in Alushta

The work of his life was Russia's Transfiguration which consisted of 12 novels, 3 stories and 2 studies. This work is reportedly comparable with Aleksandr Solzhenitsyn's Red Wheel. Both are monumental works dealing with the period before, during and after the revolution.

He died on December 3, 1958, in Alushta, aged 83.

== Awards ==
- Laureate of the Stalin Prize (1941)
- Academician of the Academy of Sciences of the USSR (1943)
- Order of Lenin (1955)

== Bibliography ==
=== Books ===
- Thoughts and Dreams (1901)
- Tundra (1902)
- Babayev (1907)
- The Transfiguration of Russia (1914–58) - [Russian: Преображение России]
- Living Water (1922) - [Russian: Живая вода]
- The Poet and the Mob (1925) - [Russian: Поэт и чернь] [Novel version]
- Sevastopol Strada (1937-1939) - [Russian: Севастопольская страда]
- Brusilov Breakthrough, A Historical Novel (1941) - [Russian: Брусиловский прорыв, исторический роман]
- Brusilov's Break-Through: a Novel of the First World War, translated into English by Helen Altschuler, Hutchinson & Co, London, 1945.
- Preobrazhenie Rossii (1955-1958), [Russian: Преображение России]

=== Plays ===
- Death (1908) - [Russian: Смерть]
- The Poet and the Mob (1934) - [Russian: Поэт и чернь] [Play version]
