= Ingemar Düring =

Swedish classical philoligist

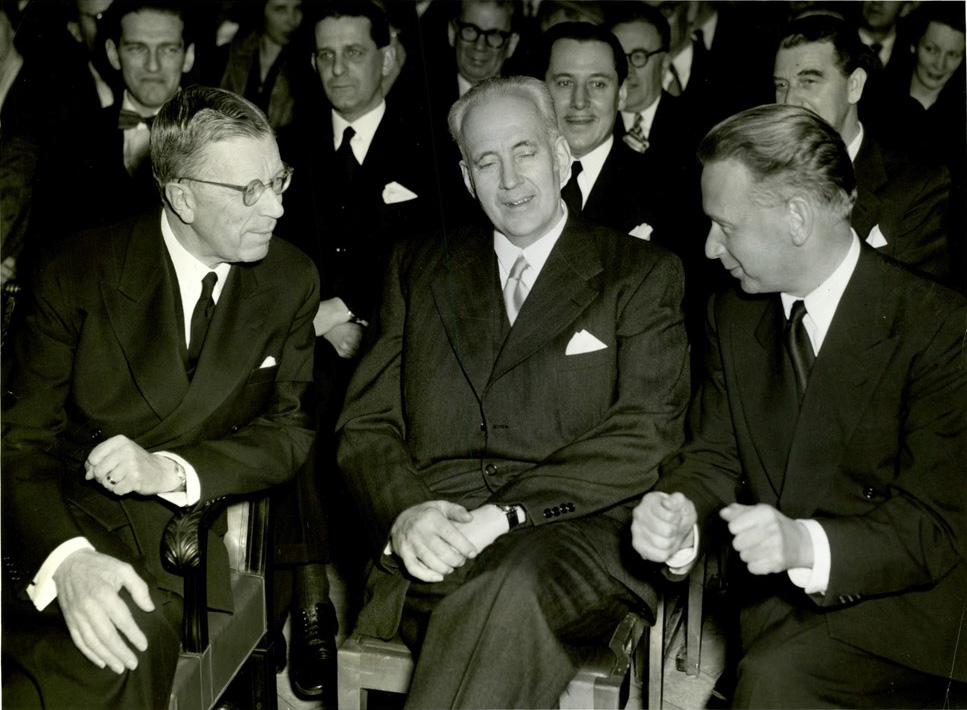
Gustaf VI Adolf, Ingemar Düring och Dag Hammarskjöld

Ingemar Düring (2 September 1903 - 23 December 1984) was a Swedish Classical Philologist. From 1945 to 1970 he was a professor at University of Gothenburg. His most notable work is Aristotle in the Ancient Biographical Tradition.
