= Johannes Rahder =

Johannes Rahder (December 27, 1898 – March 3, 1988), Dutch Orientalist, professor of Japanese at the University of Leiden (1931–1946) and Yale University (1947–1965).

== Biography ==
Rahder was born in Lubuk Begalung, the Dutch East Indies, now a subdistrict of Padang, where his father was governor of the west coast of Sumatra. The fact that he requested as a birthday present a library when he was five years old suggests that he was a precocious child.

He earned his doctorate at the University of Utrecht for an edition of the text of Daśabhûmikasûtra (1926). Because of his interest in Buddhism and linguistics, he not only studied Sanskrit and Pali, but also Chinese, Japanese and many other languages. After working for several years on the Buddhist Dictionary Hôbôgirin (published by the Maison Franco-Japonaise in Tokyo), he was appointed Professor of Sanskrit, Avestan, Old Persian and principles of Indo-Germanic linguistics at the University of Utrecht (1930).

In 1933, during one of his many visits to the Far East, Rahder shared a trip on the Trans-Siberian Railway with poet Langston Hughes who characterized Rahder as "a famous authority on obscure Oriental languages" who, having lost his luggage, "had nothing with him but paper and pencils, not even a change of clothing for the trip across the Soviet Union."

Barely a year later, he exchanged the chair for that in Japanese language and literature at Leiden University. In 1946 he resigned from his post at Leiden, and joined the faculty at the University of Hawaiʻi at Mānoa, where he had been a visiting professor during 1937–1938. The following year he went to Yale University, where he was Professor of Japanese from 1947 until his retirement in 1965.

== Publications ==
- Daśabhûmikasûtra, J.-B. ISTAS, Leuven, 1926
- Glossary of the Sanskrit, tibetain, Mongolian and Chinese versions of the Daśabhûmika-sûtra, Paris, Geuthner, 1928
- Harivarman's Satyasiddhi-śâstra, Philosophy East & West, Jan. 1956
- Etymological Dictionary of Chinese, Japanese, Korean and Ainu, Fifth Part, privately printed, New Haven, 1962
- La satkāyadṛṣṭi d'après Vibhāṣā 8, MCB 1, 1932, 227-239
