= Halldór Laxness =

Icelandic author (1902–1998)

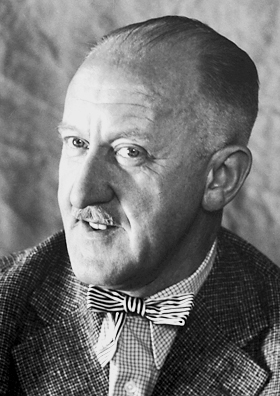
- Laxness in 1955
- Born: Halldór Guðjónsson; 23 April 1902; Reykjavík, Danish Iceland
- Died: 8 February 1998 (aged 95); Reykjavík, Iceland
- Spouses: Ingibjörg Einarsdóttir (m. 1930–1940) Auður Sveinsdóttir (m. 1945–1998)
- Writing career
- Notable awards: Nobel Prize in Literature (1955)

Halldór Kiljan Laxness (Icelandic: [ˈhaltour ˈcʰɪljan ˈlaxsnɛs]; born Halldór Guðjónsson; 23 April 1902 – 8 February 1998) was an Icelandic writer and winner of the 1955 Nobel Prize in Literature. He wrote novels, poetry, newspaper articles, essays, plays, travelogues and short stories. Writers who influenced Laxness include August Strindberg, Sigmund Freud, Knut Hamsun, Sinclair Lewis, Upton Sinclair, Bertolt Brecht, and Ernest Hemingway.

== Early life and education ==
Halldór Guðjónsson was born in Reykjavík on 23 April 1902. When he was three, his family moved to the Laxnes farm in Mosfellssveit parish. He was brought up and enormously influenced by his grandmother, Guðný Klængsdóttir, who "sang me ancient songs before I could talk, told me stories from heathen times and sang me cradle songs from the Catholic era".

He started to read books and write stories at an early age and attended the technical school in Reykjavík from 1915 to 1916. His earliest published writings appeared in 1916 in Morgunblaðið and in the children's periodical Æskan. The same year, two letters-to-the-editor Halldór wrote also appeared in the North American-Icelandic children's newspapers Sólskin, which was published in Winnipeg, Manitoba. Laxness then attended and in 1918 graduated from the Reykjavík Lyceum.

== Career ==
By the time his first novel, Barn náttúrunnar (Child of Nature, 1919), was published Halldór had already begun his travels on the European continent.

=== 1920s ===
In 1922, Halldór moved into and considered joining the Abbaye Saint-Maurice et Saint-Maur in Clervaux, Luxembourg, where the monks followed the rules of Saint Benedict of Nursia. In 1923 he was baptized and confirmed in the Catholic Church, adopting the surname Laxness after the homestead on which he was raised and adding the name Kiljan (the Icelandic name of Irish martyr Saint Killian); Laxness practiced self-study, read books, and studied French, Latin, theology and philosophy. He became a member of a group that prayed for reversion of the Nordic countries to Catholicism. Laxness wrote of his experiences in the essay Kaþólsk viðhorf (1925) and published (in fragmentary form) the novel Undir Helgahnúk (1924, revised 1967). In 1927, he published Vefarinn mikli frá Kasmír, a novel about a young man's conflicts with religion and identity in his quest to become "the most perfect person in the world". Icelandic critic Kristján Albertsson wrote of it:

Finally, finally, a grand novel which towers like a cliff above the flatland of contemporary Icelandic poetry and fiction! Iceland has gained a new literary giant—it is our duty to celebrate the fact with joy!

Laxness's religious period did not last long. He lived in the United States from 1927 to 1929, giving lectures on Iceland and attempting to write screenplays for Hollywood films. During this time he became attracted to socialism:

[Laxness] did not become a socialist in America from studying manuals of socialism but from watching the starving unemployed in the parks.

Laxness joined the socialist bandwagon... with a book Alþýðubókin (The Book of the People, 1929) of brilliant burlesque and satirical essays

Beside the fundamental idea of socialism, the strong sense of Icelandic individuality is also the sustaining element in Alþýðubókin. The two elements are entwined together in characteristic fashion and in their very union give the work its individual character.

In 1929 Laxness published an article critical of the U.S. in Heimskringla, a Canadian newspaper. This resulted in charges against him, his detention, and the forfeiture of his passport. With the aid of Upton Sinclair and the ACLU, the charges were dropped and Laxness returned to Iceland.

=== 1930s ===
By the 1930s Laxness "had become the apostle of the younger generation" of Icelandic writers.

Salka Valka (1931–32) began the great series of sociological novels, often coloured with socialist ideas, continuing almost without a break for nearly twenty years. This was probably the most brilliant period of his career, and it is the one which produced those of his works that have become most famous. But Laxness never attached himself permanently to a particular dogma.

In addition to the two parts of Salka Valka, Laxness published Fótatak manna (Steps of Men) in 1933, a collection of short stories, as well as other essays, notably Dagleið á fjöllum (A Day's Journey in the Mountains) in 1937.

Laxness's next novel was Sjálfstætt fólk (Independent People) (1934 and 1935), which has been called "one of the best books of the twentieth century."

When Salka Valka was published in English in 1936 a reviewer at the Evening Standard wrote: "No beauty is allowed to exist as ornamentation in its own right in these pages; but the work is replete from cover to cover with the beauty of its perfection."

In 1937 Laxness wrote the poem Maístjarnan (The May Star), which was set to music by Jón Ásgeirsson and became a socialist anthem.

This was followed by the four-part novel Heimsljós (World Light, 1937, 1938, 1939, and 1940), which is loosely based on the life of Magnús Hjaltason Magnusson, a minor Icelandic poet of the late 19th century. It has been "consistently regarded by many critics as his most important work."

Laxness also traveled to the Soviet Union in 1938 and wrote approvingly of the Soviet system and culture. He was present at the "Trial of the Twenty-one" and wrote about it in detail in his book Gerska ævintýrið (The Russian Adventure).

In the late 1930s Laxness developed a unique spelling system that was closer to pronunciation than standard Icelandic. This characteristic of his writing is lost in translation.

=== 1940s ===
In 1941 Laxness translated Hemingway's A Farewell to Arms into Icelandic, which caused controversy because of his use of neologisms. He continued to court controversy over the next few years through the publication of new editions of several Icelandic sagas using modern Icelandic rather than the Old Norse orthography that had become customary. Laxness and his publishing partners were taken to court after the publication of his edition of Hrafnkels saga in 1942. They were found guilty of violating a recent copyright law, but eventually acquitted when the copyright law was deemed a violation of the freedom of the press.

Laxness's "epic" three-part work of historical fiction, Íslandsklukkan (Iceland's Bell), was published between 1943 and 1946. It has been described as a novel of broad "geographical and political scope… expressly concerned with national identity and the role literature plays in forming it… a tale of colonial exploitation and the obdurate will of a suffering people." "Laxness’s three-volume Íslandsklukkan … is probably the most significant [Icelandic] novel of the 1940s."

In 1946 the English translation of Independent People was published as a Book of the Month Club selection in the U.S. and sold over 450,000 copies.

In 1945 Halldór and his second wife, Auður Sveinsdóttir, moved into Gljúfrasteinn, a new house built in the countryside near Mosfellsbær, where they started a family. In addition to her domestic duties, Auður assumed the roles of personal secretary and business manager.

In response to the establishment of a permanent U.S. military base in Keflavík, Halldór wrote the satire Atómstöðin (The Atom Station), which may have contributed to a blacklisting of his novels in the U.S.

The demoralization of the occupation period is described ... nowhere as dramatically as in Halldór Kiljan Laxness' Atómstöðin (1948)... [where he portrays] postwar society in Reykjavík, completely torn from its moorings by the avalanche of foreign gold.

For its examination of modern Reykjavík, many critics and readers consider Atómstöðin the exemplary "Reykjavík Novel."

=== 1950s ===
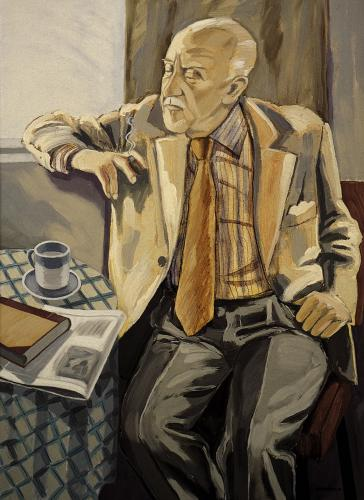
Halldór Laxness by Einar Hákonarson, 1984

In 1952 Laxness published Gerpla (The Happy Warriors, Wayward Heroes) a novel based on the Fóstbræðra saga. It deals with Vikings of around the year 1000.

As a work of art Gerpla is an unusually powerful achievement. Laxness has not transposed his subject into a modern key; he has chosen to preserve a close link to the style of the ancient sagas.

Laxness was awarded the Soviet-sponsored World Peace Council literary prize in 1952.

[Laxness] ...was a mediator between the cultural figures of the USSR and Iceland, even in times when relations between Moscow and Reykjavik were in deep crisis due to the Cold War. The active position of the writer and his activities as chairman of The Society for Cultural Relations between Iceland and the Soviet Union (MÍR) significantly contributed to the development of the bilateral relations between the Soviet Union and Iceland.

A Swedish film adaptation of his novel Salka Valka, directed by Arne Mattsson and filmed by Sven Nykvist, was released in 1954.

In 1955 Laxness was awarded the Nobel Prize in Literature "for his vivid epic power, which has renewed the great narrative art of Iceland".

His chief literary works belong to the genre... [of] narrative prose fiction. In the history of our literature Laxness is mentioned beside Snorri Sturluson, the author of "Njals saga", and his place in world literature is among writers such as Cervantes, Zola, Tolstoy, and Hamsun... He is the most prolific and skillful essayist in Icelandic literature both old and new...

In the presentation address for the Nobel, Elias Wessén said:

He is an excellent painter of Icelandic scenery and settings. Yet this is not what he has conceived of as his chief mission. "Compassion is the source of the highest poetry. Compassion with Asta Sollilja on earth," he says in one of his best books… And a social passion underlies everything Halldór Laxness has written. His personal championship of contemporary social and political questions is always very strong, sometimes so strong that it threatens to hamper the artistic side of his work. His safeguard then is the astringent humour which enables him to see even people he dislikes in a redeeming light, and which also permits him to gaze far down into the labyrinths of the human soul.

In his acceptance speech, Laxness said:

… the moral principles [my grandmother] instilled in me: never to harm a living creature; throughout my life, to place the poor, the humble, the meek of this world above all others; never to forget those who were slighted or neglected or who had suffered injustice, because it was they who, above all others, deserved our love and respect… But if an Icelandic writer forgets his origins in the depths of the nation where the story lives; if he forgets his relationship and duty to the life that is hard-pressed, the life that my old grandmother taught me to revere in my heart and mind — then fame is of little worth; along with happiness that is gained from wealth.

Laxness grew increasingly disenchanted with the Soviet bloc after the suppression of the Hungarian Revolution of 1956.

In 1957 Halldór and his wife went on a world tour, stopping in New York City, Washington, DC, Chicago, Madison, Salt Lake City, San Francisco, Peking (Beijing), Bombay (Mumbai), Cairo, and Rome. "In these and other countries he was able to appear as kind of a cultural ambassador for Iceland."

Other major accomplishments in this decade were Brekkukotsannáll, (The Fish Can Sing, 1957), and Paradísarheimt, (Paradise Reclaimed, 1960).

=== Later years ===
In the 1960s Laxness was very active in Icelandic theater. He wrote and produced plays, the most successful of which was The Pigeon Banquet (Dúfnaveislan, 1966).

In 1968 Laxness published the "visionary novel" Kristnihald undir Jökli (Under the Glacier / Christianity at the Glacier).

Laxness was awarded the Sonning Prize in 1969.

In 1970 Laxness published an influential ecological essay, Hernaðurinn gegn landinu (The War Against the Land). In the 1970s he published what he called "essay novels": Innansveitarkronika (A Parish Chronicle, 1970) and Guðsgjafaþula (A Narration of God's Gifts, 1972). Guðsgjafaþula has not yet been translated into English.

== Later life and death ==
Laxness continued to write essays and memoirs into the 1980s. As he grew older he began to suffer from Alzheimer's disease and eventually moved into a nursing home, where he died on 8 February 1998, at the age of 95.

== Personal life ==
In 1922, Laxness met Málfríður Jónsdóttir (29 August 1896 – 7 November 2003), who gave birth to his first daughter, María, on 10 April 1923.

In 1930, he married Ingibjörg Einarsdóttir (3 May 1908 – 22 January 1994), who gave birth to his son Einar on 9 August 1931. In 1940 they divorced.

In 1939, he met Auður Sveinsdóttir (30 June 1918 – 29 October 2012) at Laugavatn. Auður waited for Laxness and made sacrifices so he could focus on his work. They married in 1945 and moved into their home, Gljúfrasteinn, in Mosfellsbær later that year. Auður and Halldór had two daughters: Sigríður, born 1951, and Guðný, born 1954.

Guðný Halldórsdóttir is a filmmaker whose first work was the 1989 adaptation of Kristnihald undir jōkli (Under the Glacier). In 1999 her adaptation of Laxness's story Úngfrúin góða og Húsið (The Honour of the House) was submitted for consideration for the Academy Award for Best Foreign Film. Guðný's son, Halldór Laxness Halldórsson, is a writer, actor, and poet. A grandchild, Auður Jónsdóttir, is an author and playwright.

== Legacy ==
Gljúfrasteinn (Laxness's house, grounds, and personal effects) is now a museum operated by the government of Iceland.

In the 21st century interest in Laxness in English-speaking countries increased after most of his novels were reissued. In addition, the first English-language versions of Iceland's Bell and The Great Weaver from Kashmir were published. In 2016 a new English-language translation of Gerpla was published as Wayward Heroes. A new English-language translation of Salka Valka was released in 2022 to widespread acclaim.

Halldór Guðmundsson's book The Islander: A Biography of Halldór Laxness won the Icelandic Literary Prize for best work of nonfiction in 2004.

Numerous dramatic adaptations of Laxness's work have been staged in Iceland. In 2005 the Icelandic National Theatre premiered a play by Ólafur Haukur Símonarson, Halldór í Hollywood (Halldór in Hollywood), about Laxness's time in the United States in the 1920s.

A biennial Halldór Laxness International Literary Prize is awarded at the Reykjavík International Literary Festival.

== Bibliography ==
=== Novels ===
- 1919: Barn náttúrunnar (Child of Nature)
- 1924: Undir Helgahnúk (Under the Holy Mountain)
- 1927: Vefarinn mikli frá Kasmír (The Great Weaver from Kashmir)
- 1931: Þú vínviður hreini (O Thou Pure Vine) – Part I of Salka Valka
- 1932: Fuglinn í fjörunni (The Bird on the Beach) – Part II of Salka Valka
- 1933: Úngfrúin góða og Húsið (The Honour of the House), as part of Fótatak manna: sjö þættir
- 1934: Landnámsmaður Íslands (Icelandic Pioneers) – Part I of Sjálfstætt fólk (Independent People)
- 1935: Erfiðir tímar (Hard Times) – Part II of Sjálfstætt fólk (Independent People)
- 1937: Ljós heimsins (The Light of the World) – Part I of Heimsljós (World Light)
- 1938: Höll sumarlandsins (The Palace of the Summerland) – Part II of Heimsljós (World Light)
- 1939: Hús skáldsins (The Poet's House) – Part III of Heimsljós (World Light)
- 1940: Fegurð himinsins (The Beauty of the Skies) – Part IV of Heimsljós (World Light)
- 1943: Íslandsklukkan (Iceland's Bell) – Part I of Íslandsklukkan (Iceland's Bell)
- 1944: Hið ljósa man (The Bright Maiden) – Part II of Íslandsklukkan (Iceland's Bell)
- 1946: Eldur í Kaupinhafn (Fire in Copenhagen) – Part III of Íslandsklukkan (Iceland's Bell)
- 1948: Atómstöðin (The Atom Station)
- 1952: Gerpla (The Happy Warriors (1958) / Wayward Heroes (2016))
- 1957: Brekkukotsannáll (The Fish Can Sing)
- 1960: Paradísarheimt (Paradise Reclaimed)
- 1968: Kristnihald undir Jökli (Under the Glacier / Christianity at the Glacier)
- 1970: Innansveitarkronika (A Parish Chronicle)
- 1972: Guðsgjafaþula (A Narration of God's Gifts)

=== Stories ===
- 1923: Nokkrar sögur
- 1933: Fótatak manna
- 1935: Þórður gamli halti
- 1942: Sjö töframenn
- 1954: Þættir (collection)
- 1964: Sjöstafakverið
- 1981: Við Heygarðshornið
- 1987: Sagan af brauðinu dýra
- 1992: Jón í Brauðhúsum
- 1996: Fugl á garðstaurnum og fleiri smásögur
- 1999: Úngfrúin góða og Húsið
- 2000: Smásögur
- 2001: Kórvilla á Vestfjörðum og fleiri sögur

=== Plays ===
- 1934: Straumrof
- 1950: Snæfríður Íslandssól (from the novel Íslandsklukkan)
- 1954: Silfurtúnglið
- 1961: Strompleikurinn
- 1962: Prjónastofan Sólin
- 1966: Dúfnaveislan
- 1970: Úa (from the novel Kristnihald undir Jökli)
- 1972: Norðanstúlkan (from the novel Atómstöðin)

=== Poetry ===
- 1925: Únglíngurinn í skóginum
- 1930: Kvæðakver

=== Travelogues and essays ===
- 1925: Kaþólsk viðhorf (Catholic View)
- 1929: Alþýðubókin (The Book of the People)
- 1933: Í Austurvegi (In the Baltic)
- 1938: Gerska æfintýrið (The Russian Adventure)

=== Memoirs ===
- 1952: Heiman eg fór (subtitle: sjálfsmynd æskumanns)
- 1963: Skáldtími (A Poet's Time)
- 1975: Í túninu heima, part I
- 1976: Úngur eg var, part II
- 1978: Sjömeistarasagan, part III
- 1980: Grikklandsárið, part IV
- 1987: Dagar hjá múnkum

=== Translations ===
- 1941: Vopnin kvödd (A Farewell to Arms), Ernest Hemingway
- 1943: Kirkjan á fjallinu (Kirken på bjerget), Gunnar Gunnarsson
- 1945: Birtingur (Candide), Voltaire
- 1966: Veisla í Farángrinum (A Moveable Feast), Ernest Hemingway

=== Other ===
- 1941: Laxdaela Saga, edited with preface
- 1942: Hrafnkatla, edited with preface
- 1945: Brennunjal's Saga, edited with afterword
- 1945: Alexander's Saga, edited with preface
- 1946: Grettis Saga, edited with preface
- 1952: Kvaedi og ritgerdir by Johann Jonsson, edited with preface

== Sources ==
- Halldór Guðmundsson, The Islander. (London: Maclehose Press, 2008)
- Peter Hallberg, Halldór Laxness. (New York: Twanye publishers, 1971)
