= Libro de los Epítomes =

16th-century book catalogue

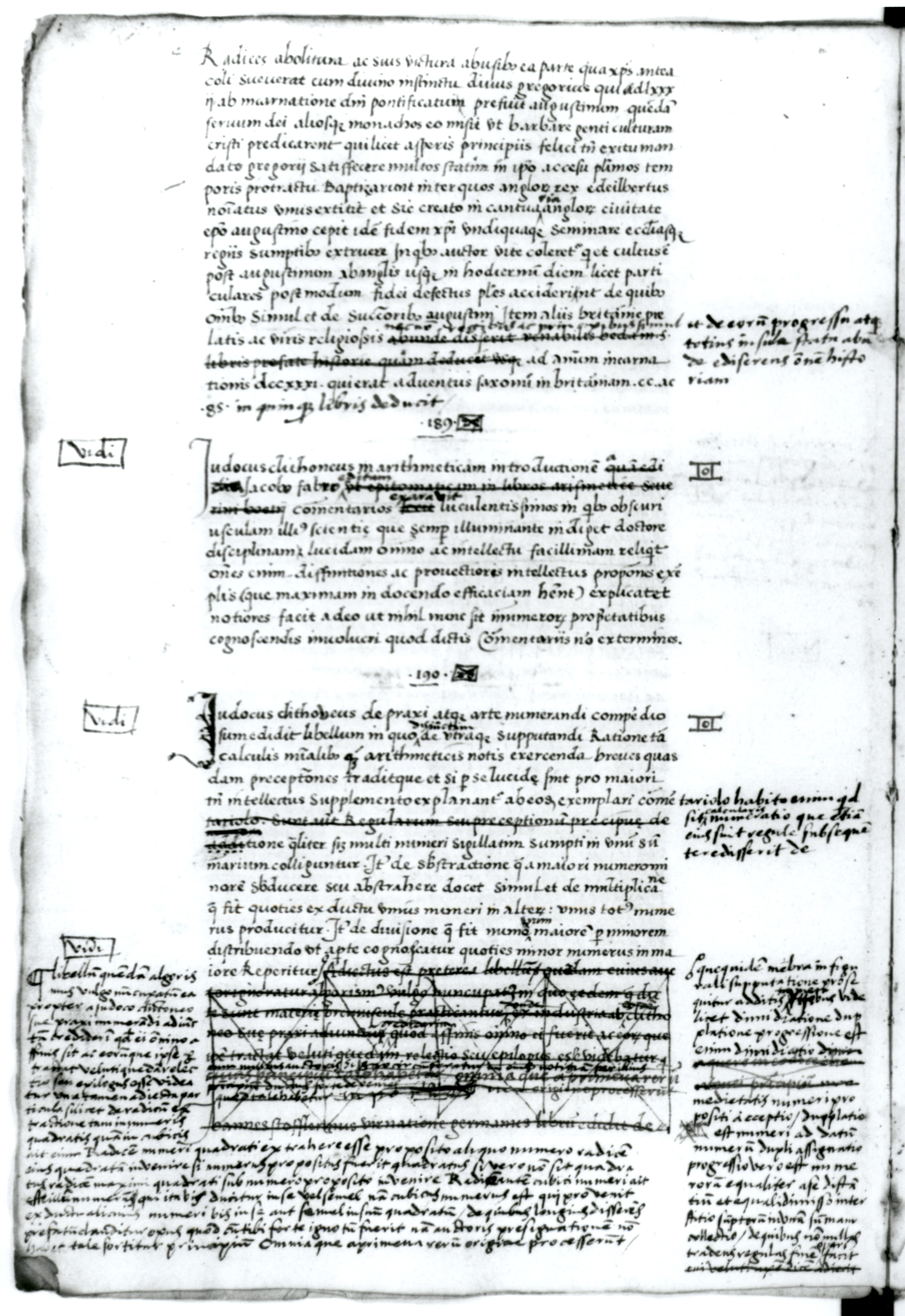
A page from El Libro de los Epítomes with corrections and marginal notes

The Libro de los Epítomes (The Book of Epitomes) is a catalogue summarising part of the library of around 15–20,000 books which Ferdinand Columbus (Spanish: Fernando Colón) assembled in the early sixteenth-century in an effort to create a library of every book in the world. The manuscript is currently part of the Arnamagnæan Manuscript Collection in Copenhagen.

== Background and library ==
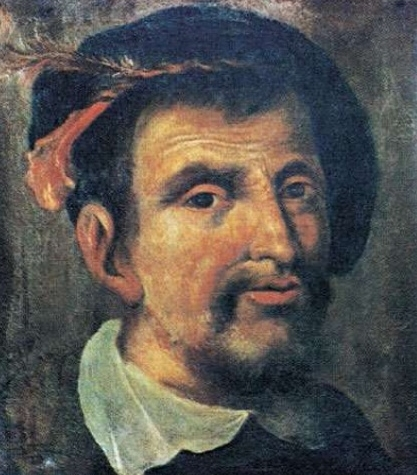
Ferdinand Columbus

Ferdinand Columbus (1488–1539) was a Spanish bibliographer and cosmographer, and the son of the explorer Christopher Columbus. In the early sixteenth century he embarked on a project to create a library of every book in the world, assembling around 15–20,000 books during his lifetime and creating the largest library of his day. Unlike other collectors who sought Greek and Latin manuscripts, Columbus recognised the significance of print and prioritised printed books and ephemeral and popular printed material such as ballads and newspapers.

The collection has been housed at Seville Cathedral since 1552, but only about a quarter of the books have survived; these form the Biblioteca Colombina of the Institución Colombina.

== The Book of Epitomes ==
To create the Libro de los Epítomes, Columbus used a team of readers and writers to prepare a summary of each book in his library. The entries vary from just a few lines for the smaller works to 51 pages for the largest ; around 46 pages for major works such as the writings of Plato. There are 1877 epitomes in the book, which consists of 982 leaves (1,964 pages) and is 14 centimetres (5.5 in) thick.

== Rediscovery ==
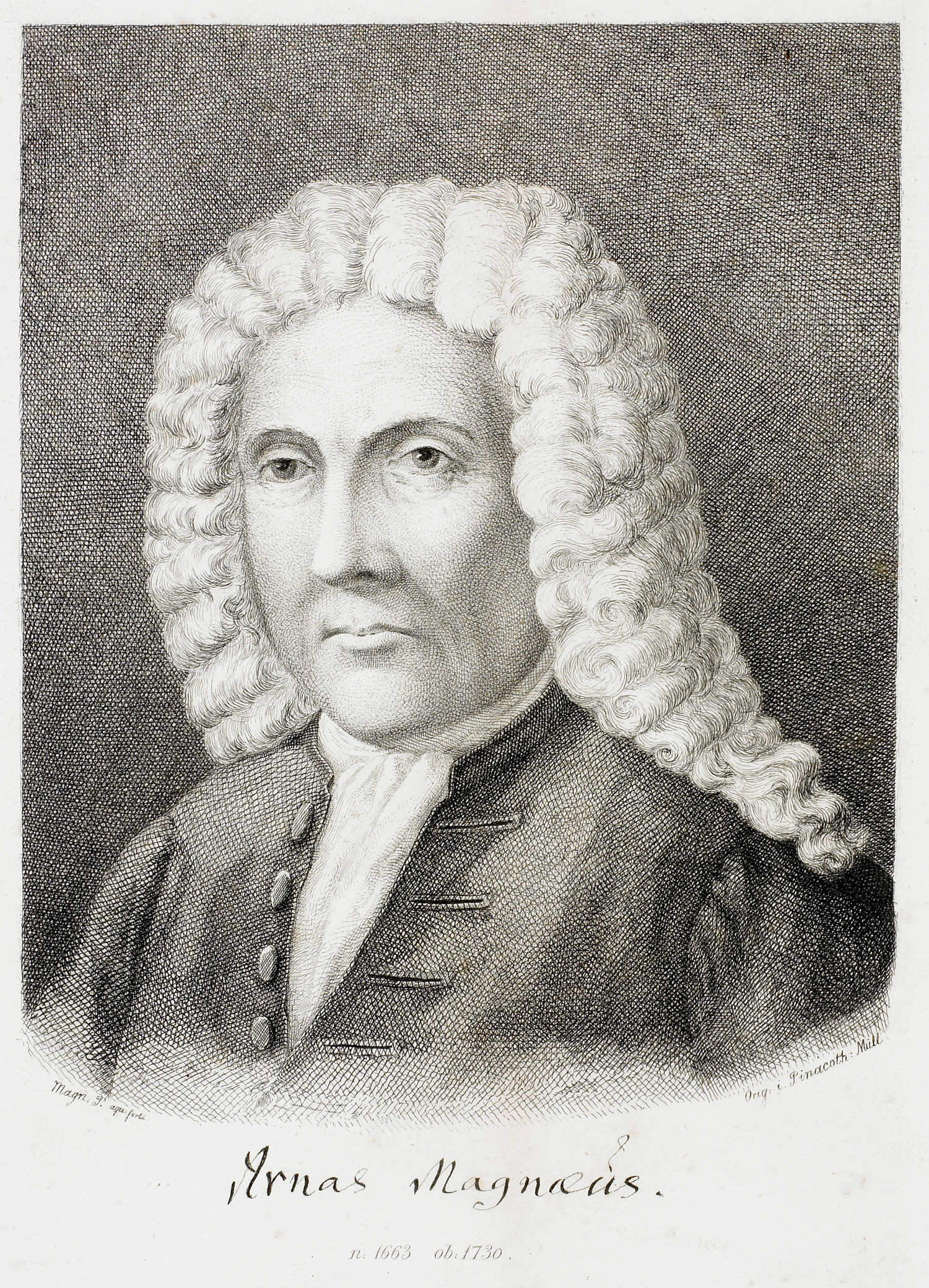
Árni Magnússon

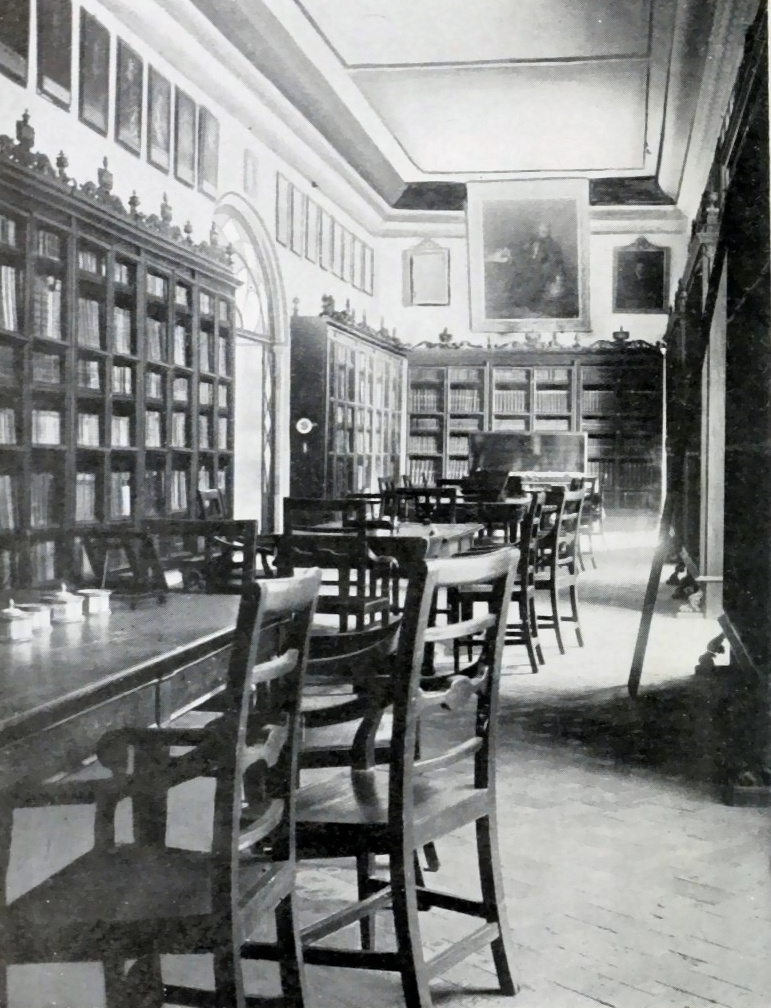
Biblioteca Colombina, 1913

The catalogue was positively identified in 2019, after Guy Lazure of the University of Windsor in Canada suggested it could be a "bibliographical tool" from Ferdinand Columbus's library. It had been thought lost since its existence was last recorded in Spain at the time of Columbus's death. It was found as part of the Arnamagnæan Manuscript Collection in Copenhagen, a collection established by Árni Magnússon (1663–1730), an Icelandic scholar who donated his collection to the University of Copenhagen at his death in 1730. The manuscript is currently part of the Arnamagnæan Manuscript Collection with the shelfmark AM 377 fol.

N. Kıvılcım Yavuz suggests that the volume might have arrived in Denmark together with a collection of manuscripts brought by Cornelius Lerche, an envoy to the Spanish court.

A similar catalogue of Columbus's collection of some 3,200 prints was already known, and was published in 2004.

== Significance and future work ==
According to University of Cambridge academic Edward Wilson-Lee, author of a recent biography of Columbus and account of his library, The Catalogue of Shipwrecked Books, "It's a discovery of immense importance, not only because it contains so much information about how people read 500 years ago, but also, because it contains summaries of books that no longer exist, lost in every other form than these summaries".

Plans for the manuscript to be digitised and transcribed were already hinted at in April 2019. In December 2019, Matthew James Driscoll from the Arnamagnæan Institute at the University of Copenhagen was awarded a three-year research grant by the Carlsberg Foundation to conduct further studies on the manuscript. The project is titled "The Book of Books: Hernando Colón's Libro de los Epítomes" and began in May 2020.
