= Jón Ólafsson of Grunnavík =

Icelandic scholar (1705–1779)

Jón Ólafsson of Grunnavík (Jón Ólafsson frá Grunnavík, also known as Jón Grunnvíkingur or Grunnavíkur-Jón, 1705–1779) was an Icelandic scholar. Originally from Grunnavík, Westfjords, northwestern Iceland, he sailed for Copenhagen in autumn 1726 and served as assistant to the Icelandic philologist Árni Magnússon for the last three years of the latter's life. He became the first scholar to receive the stipend of the Arnamagnæan Fund, and spent most of his life as a scholar at that collection, which was at the time stored in the attic of the Trinity Church in Copenhagen.

Jón Ólafsson is the author of an extensive Icelandic dictionary, never published, and a 1732 Runologia, a treatise on runology. In the fire of Copenhagen of 1728, the original manuscript of the Heiðarvíga saga was lost along with a recent copy made by Jón Grunnvíkingur; after the fire, he wrote down a summary of the saga from memory, which is the only form in which the saga's contents survive today. He also wrote an extensive account of the Copenhagen fire and the efforts to save Árni Magnússon's collection at the last minute, Relatio of the Fire in Copenhagen in October 1728. In recent years, many of Jón Ólafsson's works have been published for the first time by a society called Góðvinir Grunnavíkur-Jóns (The Friends of Grunnavíkur-Jón).

The character of Jón Grindvicensis in Halldór Laxness's historical novel Iceland's Bell is based on Jón Grunnvíkingur.

== Published writings ==
- Ritgerð um leiki (Essay on Games). Edited by Guðrún Kvaran and Svavar Sigmundsson. Reykjavík: Góðvinir Grunnavíkur-Jóns, 2023.
- Safn til íslenskrar bókmenntasögu (A Draft of a History of Icelandic Literature). Edited by Guðrún Ingólfsdóttir and Þórunn Sigurðardóttir. Reykjavík: Stofnun Árna Magnússonar, 2018.
- Ævisögur ypparlegra merkismanna (Biographies of Excellent Men). Edited by Guðrún Ása Grímsdóttir. Reykjavík: Góðvinir Grunnavíkur-Jóns, 2013.
- Náttúrufræði: fiskafræði - steinafræði (Natural Sciences: Ichthyology and Minerology). Reykjavík: Góðvinir Grunnavíkur-Jóns, 2007.
- Relatio af Kaupmannahafnarbrunanum sem skeði í október 1728 og fleiri skrif (An Account of the Copenhagen Fire in October 1728 and Other Writings). Edited by Sigurgeir Steingrímsson. Reykjavík: Góðvinir Grunnavíkur-Jóns, 2005.
- Vitjun sína vakta ber. Edited by Guðrún Ingólfsdóttir and Svavar Sigmundsson. Reykjavík: Góðvinir Grunnavíkur-Jóns and Háskólaútgafan, 1999.
- Hagþenkir: JS 83 fol. Edited by Þórunn Sigurðardóttir. Reykjavík: Góðvinir Grunnavíkur-Jóns, 1996.

== Unpublished writings (selected) ==
- AM 413 fol. Runologia.
- AM 431 fol. On Snorra-Edda.
- AM 433 fol. Icelandic-Latin Dictionary.
- AM 477 fol. A Catalogue of the Manuscript Collection of Árni Magnússon.
- NKS 251 8vo. Diary, 1725–1731.

== Bibliography ==
- Jón Helgason, Jón Ólafsson frá Grunnavík, Copenhagen, 1926.
- Guðrún Ása Grímsdóttir. "Lærður Íslendingur á Turni." Gripla 12 (2001): 125–147.
