= Epitome =

Summary of a literary work

An epitome (/ɪ.ˈpɪt.ə.miː/, ih-PIT-ə-mee; Greek: ἐπιτομή, from ἐπιτέμνειν epitemnein meaning "to cut short") is a summary or miniature form, or an instance that represents a larger reality, also used as a synonym for embodiment. Epitomacy represents "to the degree of." An abridgment differs from an epitome in that an abridgment is made of selected quotations of a larger work; no new writing is composed, as opposed to the epitome, which is an original summation of a work, at least in part.

Many documents from the Ancient Greek and Roman worlds survive now only "in epitome," referring to the practice of some later authors (epitomators) who wrote distilled versions of larger works now lost. Some writers attempted to convey the stance and spirit of the original, while others added further details or anecdotes regarding the general subject. As with all secondary historical sources, a different bias not present in the original may creep in.

Documents surviving in epitome differ from those surviving only as fragments quoted in later works and those used as unacknowledged sources by later scholars, as they can stand as discrete documents but refracted through the views of another author.

Epitomes of a kind are still produced today when dealing with a corpus of literature, especially classical works often considered dense, unwieldy and unlikely to be read by the average person, to make them more accessible: some are more along the lines of abridgments, such as many which have been written of Edward Gibbon's The History of the Decline and Fall of the Roman Empire, a work of six large volumes (about 3600 pages) often published as one volume of about 1400 pages.

Some are of the same type as the ancient epitome, such as various epitomes of the Summa Theologiae of Thomas Aquinas, originally written as an introductory textbook in theology and now accessible to very few except for the learned in theology and Aristotelian philosophy, such as A Summa of the Summa and A Shorter Summa. Many epitomes today are published under the general title "The Companion to …", such as The Oxford Companion to Aristotle, or "An Overview of …", or "guides," such as An Overview of the Thought of Immanuel Kant, How to Read Hans Urs von Balthasar, or, in some cases, as an introduction, in the cases of An Introduction to Søren Kierkegaard or A Very Short Introduction to the New Testament (many philosophical "introductions" and "guides" share the epitomic form, unlike general "introductions" to a field).

== Examples of epitomes for lost works ==
- Sextus Julius Africanus and Eusebius epitomes of Manetho's Aegyptiaca
- John Xiphilinus's precis of the missing portions of Cassius Dio's Roman History
- Justin's abridged version of the Philippic History by Gnaeus Pompeius Trogus, one of the main sources for the life of Alexander the Great
- The epitome of Book IV of the Pseudo-Apollodorus's Bibliotheca [Library], a comprehensive encyclopedia of Greek mythology
- Libro de los Epítomes, a 2000-page volume summarising the 16th-century collection of Ferdinand Columbus (Hernando Colón) of over 15000 books

== See also ==
- Abridgment
- Abstract, also called a précis or synopsis
- Executive summary
- Crib sheet, also called a cheat sheet
- Epitome de Caesaribus, short fourth-century Latin example of an epitome
- Epítome de la conquista del Nuevo Reino de Granada, a probably sixteenth-century description of the Spanish conquest of the Muisca
- Epitome Astronomiae Copernicanae, a seventeenth-century astronomy textbook by Kepler
