= Árni Magnússon Institute for Icelandic Studies =

Academic institute in Reykjavík

Coordinates: 64°08′20″N 21°57′05″W

The Árni Magnússon Institute for Icelandic Studies (Icelandic: Stofnun Árna Magnússonar í íslenskum fræðum [ˈstɔpnʏn ˈau(r)tna ˈmaknusˌsɔːnar iː ˈistlɛnskʏm ˈfraiːðʏm]; abbreviated to Árnastofnun [ˈau(r)tnaˌstɔpnʏn]) is a university-level institute, which operates on an independent budget under the auspices of the Ministry of Culture, Innovation and Higher Education. The institute fosters close links with the University of Iceland, and forms part of its academic community.

According to Act 2006 no. 40 12 June, the role of the institute is to conduct research in the field of Icelandic studies and related scholarly disciplines, in particular Icelandic language and literature; to disseminate knowledge in these fields; and to preserve and augment the collections entrusted to its care.

The Árni Magnússon Institute for Icelandic Studies is named after the 17th–18th century collector of medieval Icelandic manuscripts, Árni Magnússon.

The Árni Magnússon Institute for Icelandic Studies was founded in 2006 by the merger of five former institutes, the Árni Magnússon Institute, the Icelandic Language Institute, the University of Iceland Lexicography Project, the Sigurður Nordal Institute, and the Icelandic Place-Names Institute.

== Location and manuscript exhibition ==
Since 2023, the institute has been located in the Edda building on the campus of the University of Iceland by Arngrímsgata in Reykjavík.

In 2005, the Alþingi had approved the construction of a purpose-built Hús íslenskunnar ('House of Icelandic') or Hús íslenskra fræða ('House of Icelandic Studies') to house the whole Institute, beside the National Library of Iceland. Ground was broken in 2013 and a large hole dug before building work was temporarily halted following a change of government; the hole came to be known as the 'hola íslenskra fræða' ('hole of Icelandic studies'). On 7 May 2019 it was declared that work would resume. On April 19, 2023, the house that had been given its name Edda, was opened to the public. Since November 2024, there is a permanent manuscript exhibition in Edda, open to the public.

== Manuscripts ==
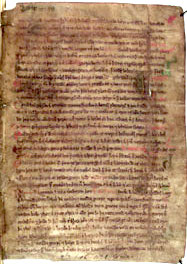
A page from a vellum manuscript of Landnáma

After Iceland received home rule from the Danish government in 1904, the Icelandic parliament (Alþingi) began to petition for the return to Iceland of at least a significant portion of the Arnamagnæan Manuscript Collection, the manuscripts and other documents collected in the late 17th and early 18th centuries by the Icelandic antiquarian and scholar Árni Magnússon. In 1927–1928 four manuscripts and some 700 charters and other legal documents were returned to the Icelandic National Archives. In 1962 a special institute was set up under the name Handritastofnun Íslands (English: "Icelandic Manuscript Institute"). Ten years later, after the transfer of manuscripts from Copenhagen had begun in earnest, the laws concerning the institute were changed and it was renamed Stofnun Árna Magnússonar á Íslandi. In June 2006 the Icelandic Alþingi adopted new legislation merging the Icelandic Language Institute, the University of Iceland Lexicography Project, the Árni Magnússon Institute, the Sigurður Nordal Institute, and the Icelandic Place-Names Institute to create a larger independent institute, the Árni Magnússon Institute for Icelandic Studies, as of 1 September 2006. The new institute assumed the roles and tasks previously performed by each of the individual institutes.

Since 2023, the Árni Magnússon Institute for Icelandic Studies has been located in the building Edda at the University of Iceland campus. It houses a number of historically and culturally important manuscripts, the bulk of them from the Arnamagnæan Manuscript Collection. Among these are:

- AM 113 folio (the Íslendingabók)
- AM 237 a folio / (four sheets, 1140–1160)
- AM 347 folio (Law book)
- AM 371 4to (the Landnámabók)
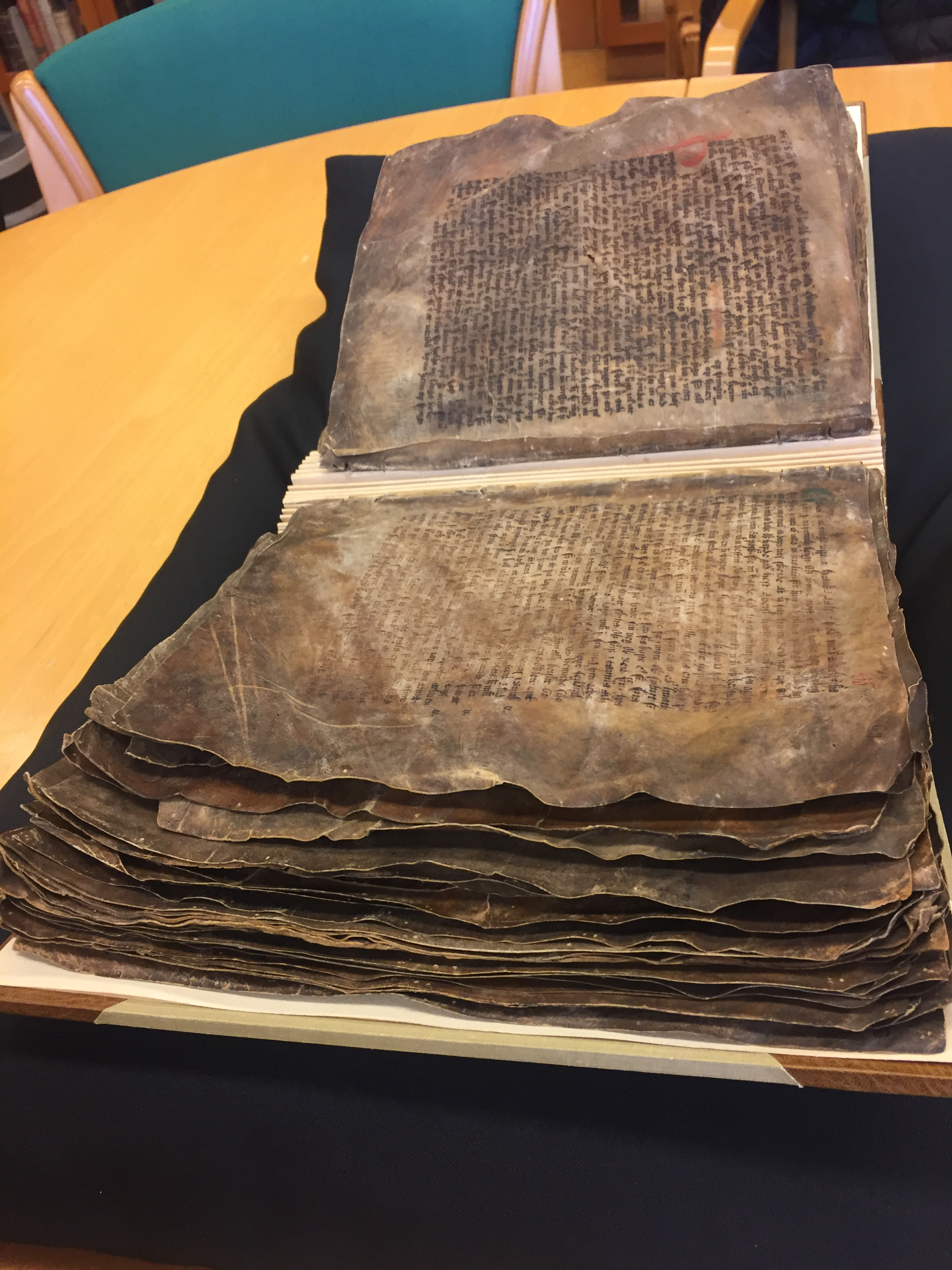

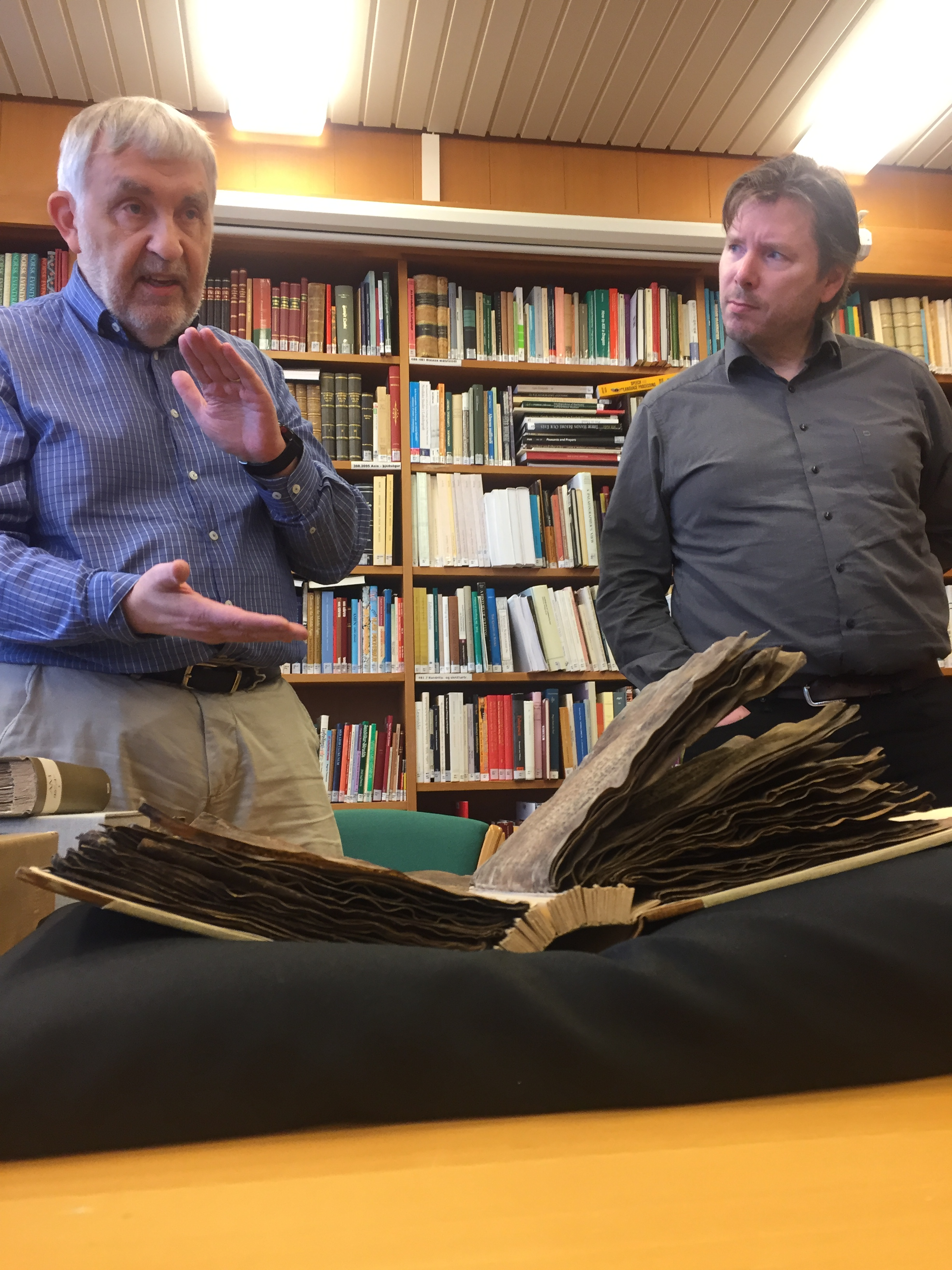

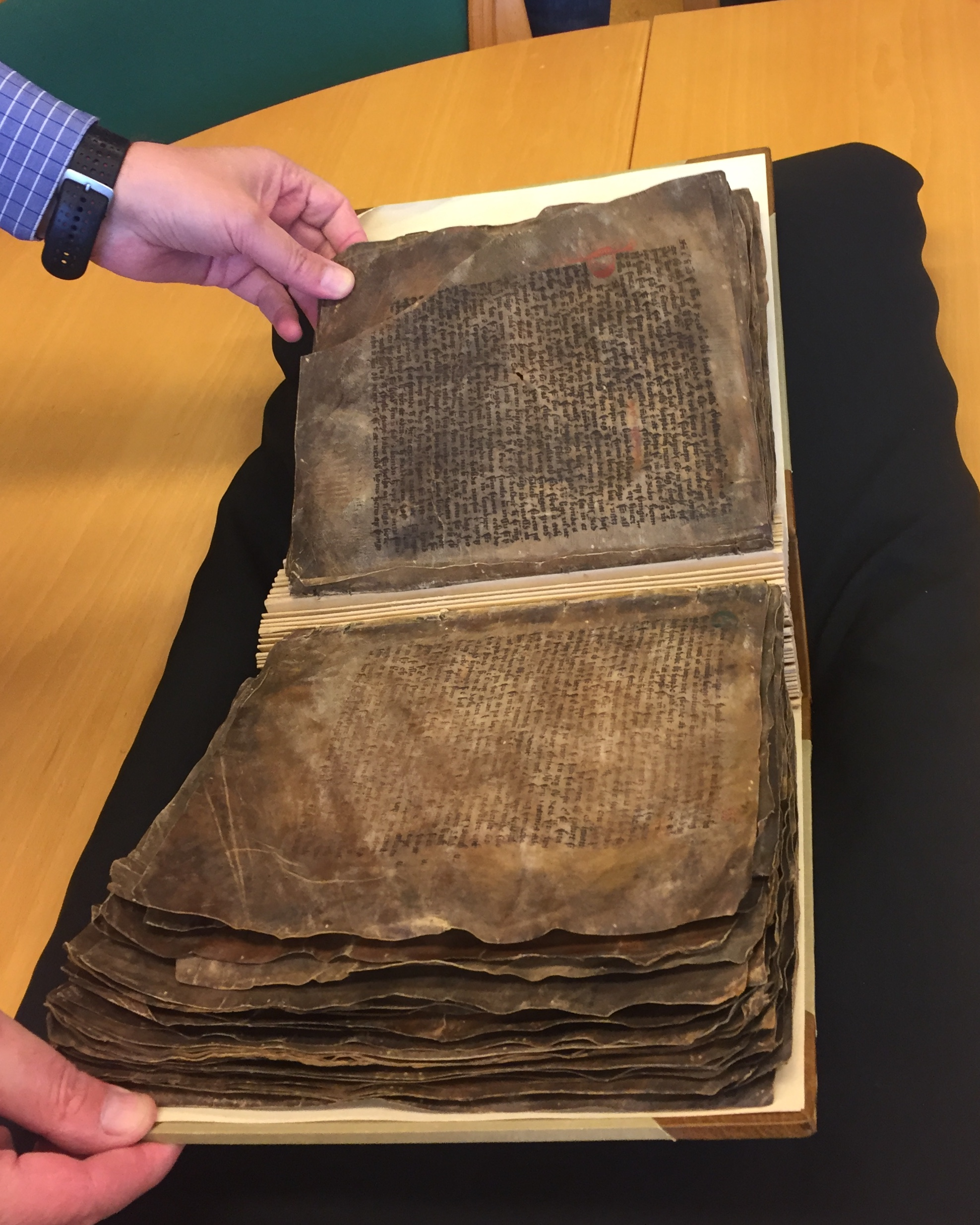
- AM 738 4to (Edda oblongata)
- GKS 1005 folio (the Flateyjarbók)
- GKS 2365 4to (Codex Regius of the Poetic Edda)
- GKS 2367 4to (Codex Regius of the Prose Edda)
- Icelandic Manuscript, SÁM 66
- Anonymous Basque-Icelandic glossaries that contain several pidgin words and phrases. They were found among the documents of 18th century scholar Jón Ólafsson of Grunnavík, titled:
  - Vocabula Gallica ("French words"). Written in the latter part of the 17th century, a total of 16 pages containing 517 words and short sentences, and 46 numerals.
  - Vocabula Biscaica ("Biscayan (Basque) words"). A copy written in the 18th century by Jón Ólafsson, the original is lost. It contains a total of 229 words and short sentences, and 49 numerals. This glossary contains several pidgin words and phrases.

In 1986 Jón Ólafsson's manuscripts were brought back from Denmark to Iceland. The manuscript with the Basque-Icelandic glossaries:

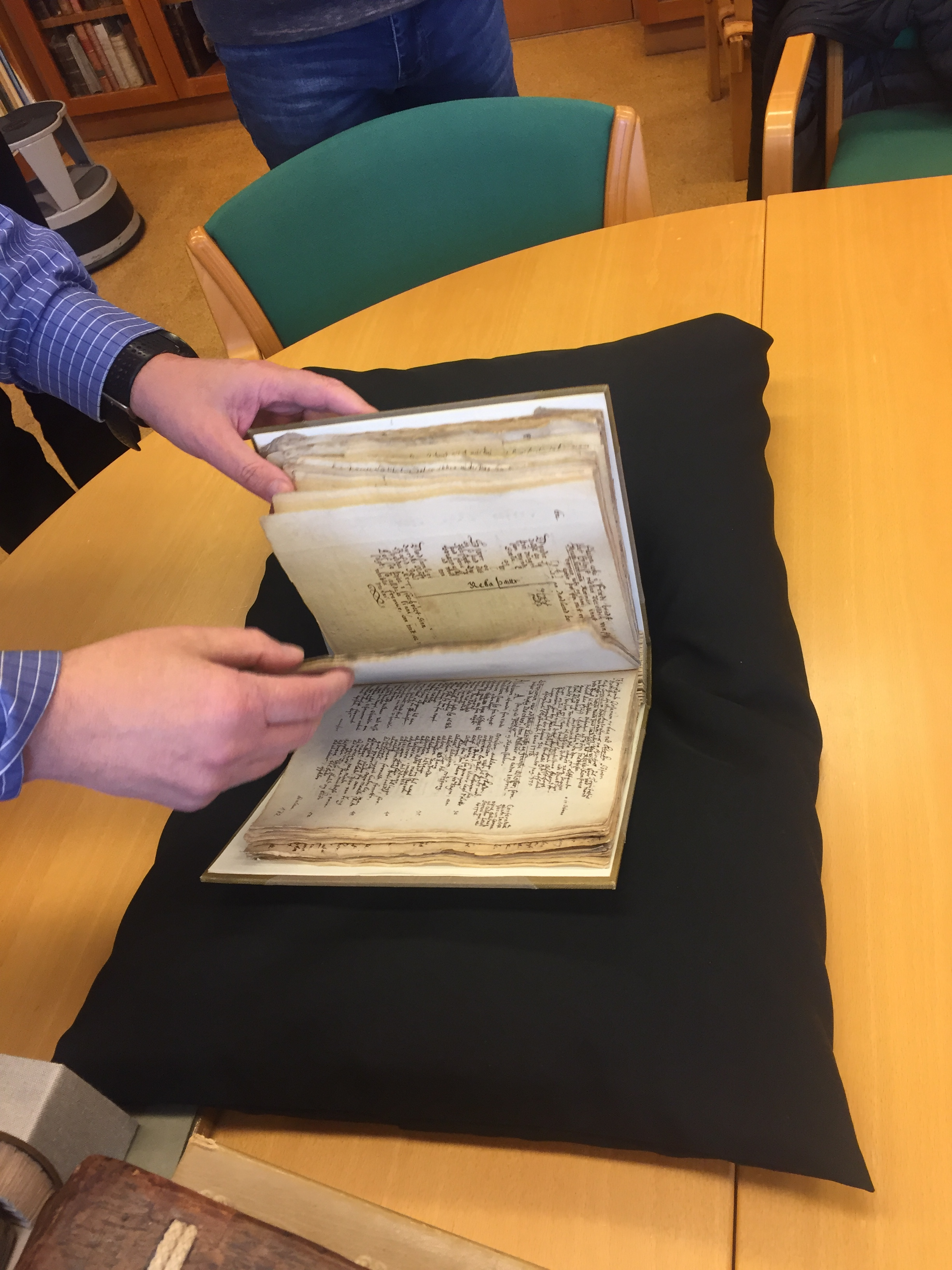

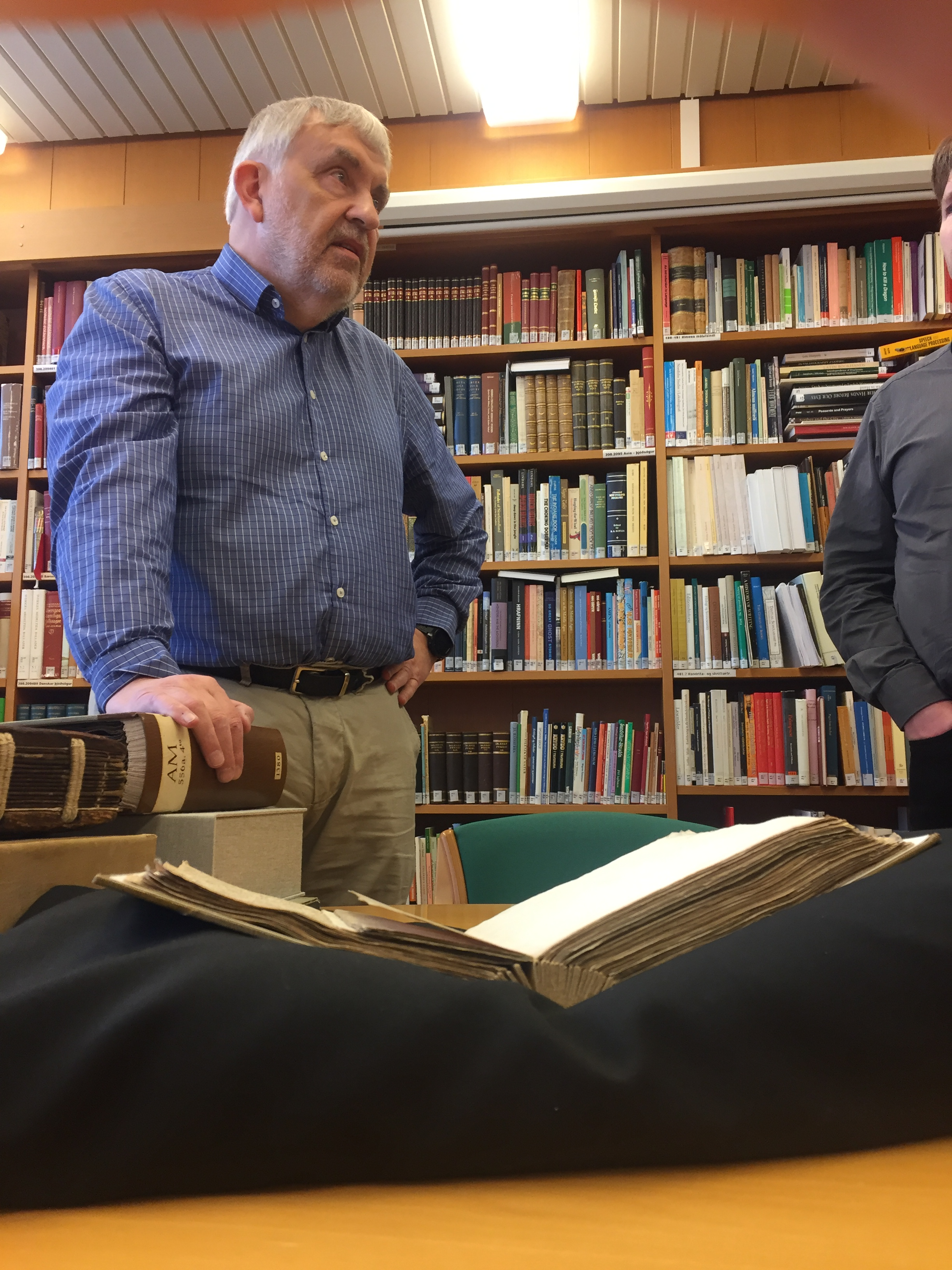

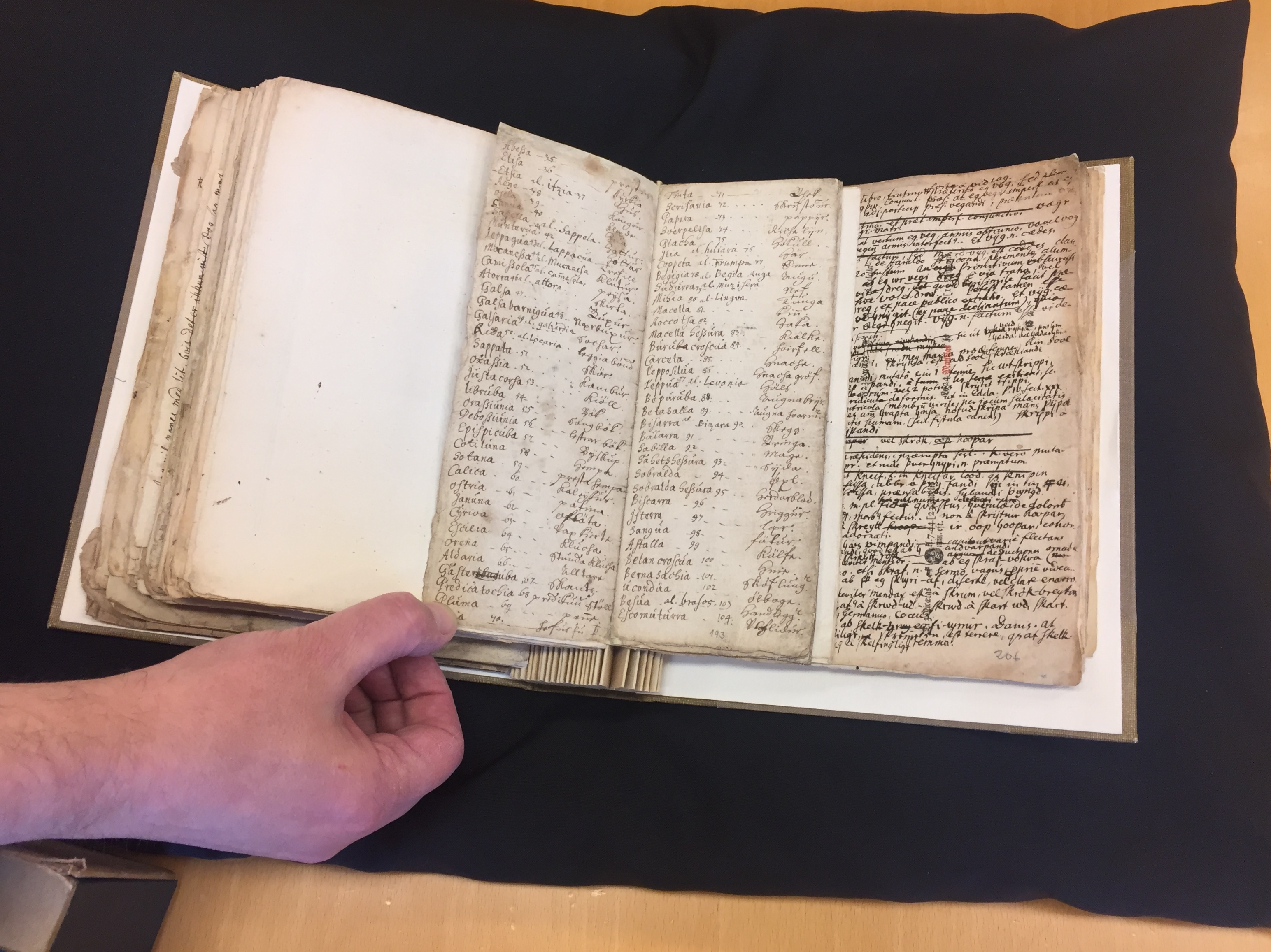

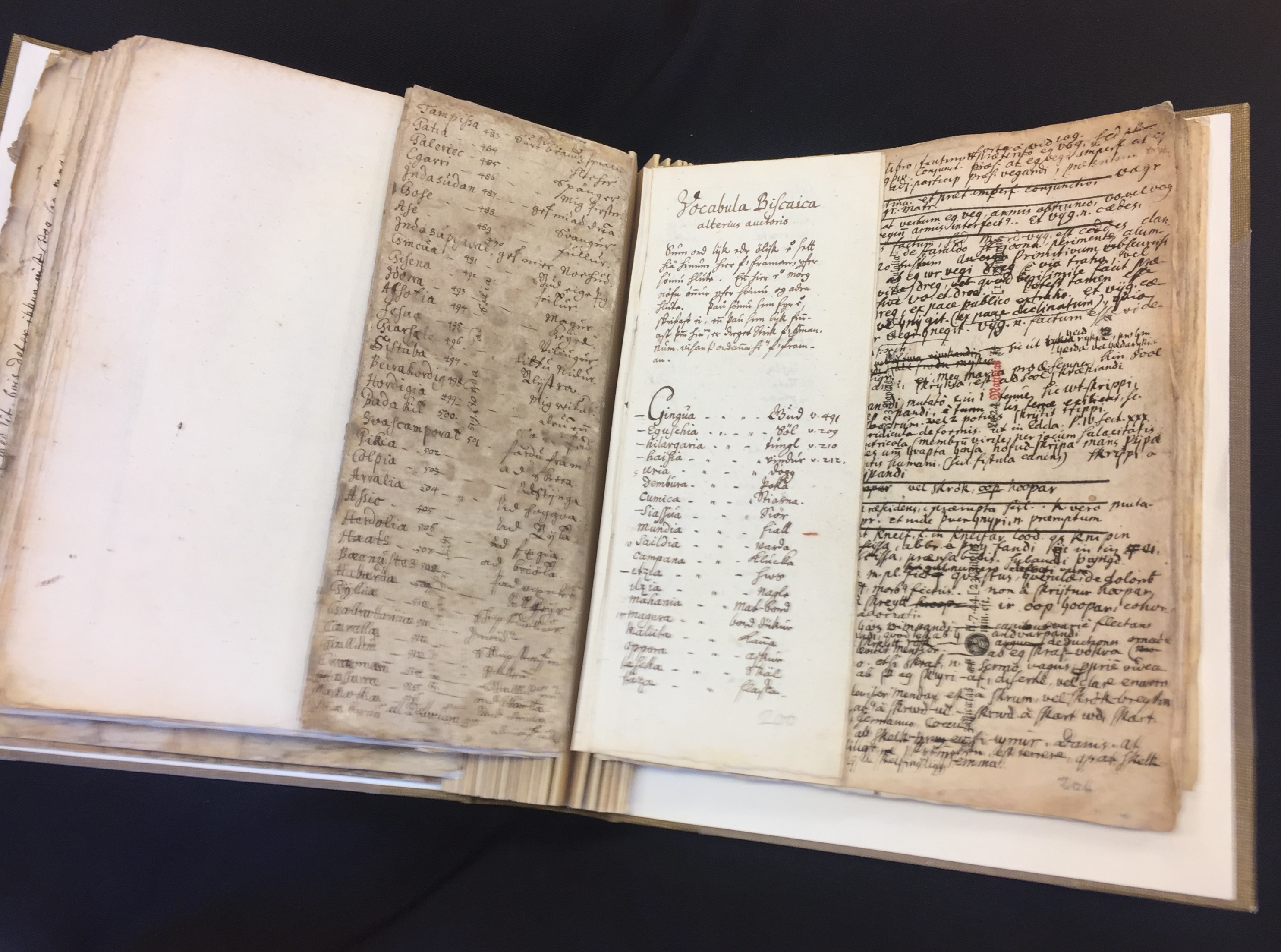

== See also ==
- Arnamagnæan Institute, the institution in Copenhagen housing the remainder of the Árni Magnússon collection
- List of libraries in Iceland
