= Þökk =

Jötunn in Norse mythology

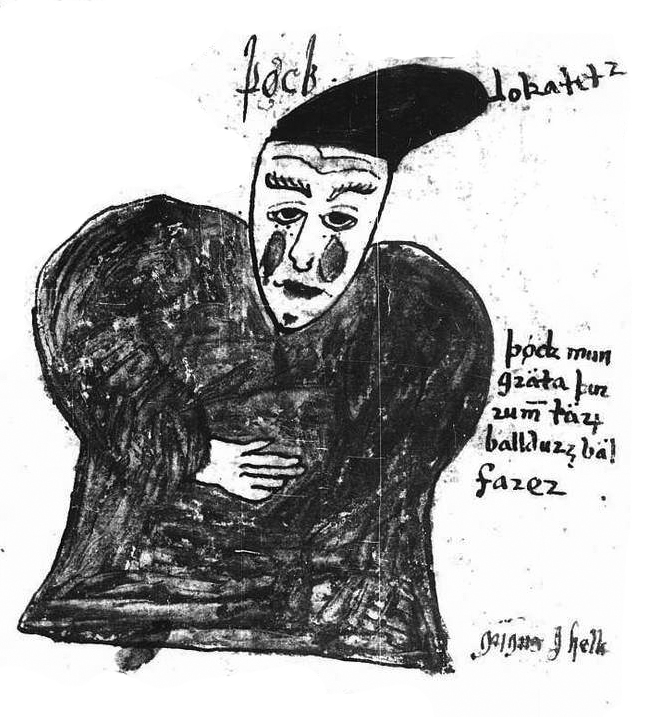
Þökk in an illustration from the 17th-century Icelandic manuscript AM 738 4to, the so-called Langa Edda or Edda Oblongata.

Þökk (also Thökk) (Old Norse / Icelandic "Thanks") is a jötunn in Norse mythology, presumed to be Loki in disguise, who refuses to weep for the slain Baldr, thus forcing Baldr to stay in Hel.

== Prose Edda ==
After Baldr was killed, Hermóðr rode to Hel. Hel, the ruler of the realm of the same name, agreed that Baldr should go back to the living if all things in the world wept for him. So the Æsir sent messengers all over the world, and all wept for him, but:

"Then, when the messengers went home, having well wrought their errand, they found, in a certain cave, where a giantess sat: she called herself Thǫkk. They prayed her to weep Baldr out of Hel; she answered:

Thǫkk will weep
waterless tears
For Baldr's bale-fare;
Living or dead,
I loved not the churl's son;
Let Hel hold to that she hath!

And men deem that she who was there was Loki Laufeyarson, who hath wrought most ill among the Æsir."

—Gylfaginning (49), Brodeur's translation
