= Arnamagnæan Manuscript Collection =

Icelandic manuscript collection

The Arnamagnæan Manuscript Collection (Danish: Den Arnamagnæanske Håndskriftsamling, Icelandic: Handritasafn Árna Magnússonar) derives its name from the Icelandic scholar and antiquarian Árni Magnússon (1663–1730) — Arnas Magnæus in Latinised form — who in addition to his duties as Secretary of the Royal Archives and Professor of Danish Antiquities at the University of Copenhagen, spent much of his life building up the collection of manuscripts that now bears his name. The majority of these manuscripts were from Árni's native Iceland, but he also acquired many important Norwegian, Danish and Swedish manuscripts, as well as a number of continental provenances. In addition to the manuscripts proper, the collection contains about 14000 Icelandic, Norwegian (including Faroese, Shetland and Orcadian) and Danish charters, both originals and first-hand copies (apographa). After being housed since Árni's death at the University of Copenhagen, in the Arnamagnæan Institute, under a 1965 parliamentary ruling the collection is now divided between there and the Árni Magnússon Institute for Icelandic Studies in Reykjavík, Iceland.

== History ==
When Árni died in 1730 he bequeathed his collection to the University of Copenhagen, whereupon it became part of the University Library. The collection has been augmented over the years through individual purchases and gifts and the acquisition of a number of smaller collections, for example, that of the Danish grammarian Rasmus Rask, bringing the total number of items to around 3000. In 1956 the Arnamagnæan Institute (Danish: Det Arnamagnæanske Institut, now Den Arnamagnæanske Samling) was established to care for and further the study of the manuscripts in the collection.

Even before its constitutional separation from Denmark in 1944, Iceland had begun to petition for the return of these manuscripts. After much-heated debate, the Danish parliament decided in May 1965 that such documents in the Arnamagnæan Collection as might be held to be "Icelandic cultural property" (islandsk kultureje) — broadly defined as a work composed or translated by an Icelander and whose content is wholly or chiefly concerned with Iceland — were to be transferred to the newly established Icelandic Manuscript Institute (now the Árni Magnússon Institute for Icelandic Studies, Icelandic: Stofnun Árna Magnússonar í íslenskum fræðum), a part of the University of Iceland. It further provided for the transfer from the Danish Royal Library (Det kongelige Bibliotek) of manuscripts belonging to the same categories as the manuscripts relinquished by the Arnamagnæan Institute, and contained a special clause relating to the transfer to Iceland of two manuscripts, the Codex Regius of the Poetic Edda and the vellum codex Flateyjarbók, both of which were in the Danish Royal Library (and would not have been deemed islandsk kultureje under the terms of the treaty). These were handed over to Iceland in a ceremony held immediately after the ratification of the treaty in 1971. The first consignment of manuscripts was dispatched from Copenhagen to Reykjavík in June 1973 and the last two were handed over in June 1997. Altogether a total of 1,666 manuscripts, and all the Icelandic charters and apographa, have been transferred to Iceland, slightly over half the collection, in addition to 141 manuscripts from the Danish Royal Library. Of the manuscripts remaining in Copenhagen, about half is Icelandic but are either copies made in Copenhagen, have as their chief concern matters not directly related to Iceland, e.g. the histories of the kings of Norway and Denmark, religious texts or translations from Latin and other languages. The remainder of the collection comprises the Danish, Swedish, Norwegian and continental European manuscripts mentioned above.

In 2009 the Arnamagnæan Manuscript Collection was added to UNESCO's Memory of the World International Register in recognition of its historical value.

In 2019 the Arnamagnæan Institute announced that one of the manuscripts in the collection (AM 377 fol.) was identified as Ferdinand Columbus's Libro de los Epítomes.
