= AM 738 4to =

Icelandic manuscript

AM 738 4to, Edda oblongata or Langa Edda, is a late 17th-century Icelandic paper manuscript currently housed in the Árni Magnússon Institute for Icelandic Studies, Reykjavík. The manuscript is most notable for its distinct oblong format and the numerous colorful illustrations it contains.

== Description ==
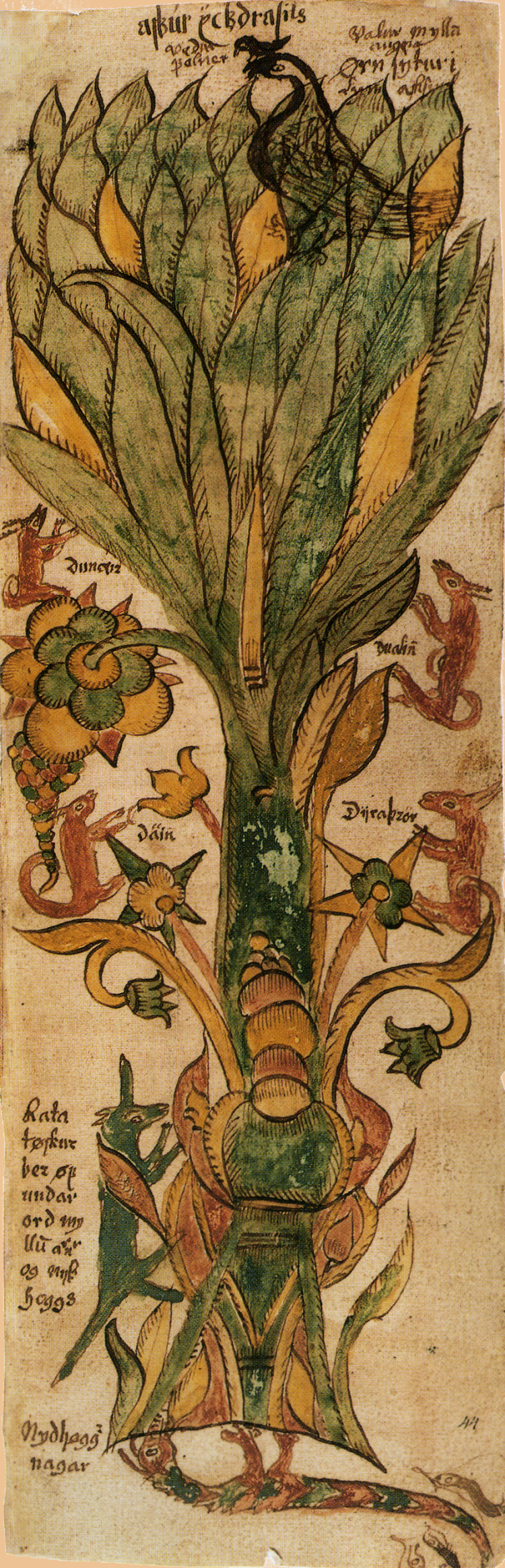
AM 738 4to page 43r, depicting the tree Yggdrasil and demonstrating the manuscript's unusual format

The manuscript consists of 135 leaves and is unusually tall compared to its width (33 cm x 10.5 cm). Dated to c. 1680, it contains a diverse collection of texts including chapters from the Prose Edda as well as numerous Eddic poems, a variety of skaldic poetry, a rune poem, the Christian visionary poem Sólarljóð, and many other short texts. Among the latter are three poems by minister and poet Hallgrímur Pétursson, including his well-known Aldarháttur. The only other contemporary poet identified by name in the manuscript is Oddr Þórðarson, who is otherwise not well known.

== History ==
Preceding the chapters from the Prose Edda, the manuscript features an illustrated title page that suggests this part, and perhaps the entire manuscript, was completed in 1680. The same page features the initials "S G," which may refer to the name of the scribe and/or illustrator of the manuscript. These initials possibly allude to Sigurður Gíslason (1655–1688), a poet whom the manuscript collector Árni Magnússon identified as an owner of the manuscript. However, the initials "G S S" also appear near the end of the manuscript and may refer to the involvement of another unidentified scribe.

At some point, Ingibjörg Jónsdóttir (1643–1710), who was the half-sister of Sigurður Gíslason, the manuscript's probable scribe and/or illustrator, took possession of the manuscript. Following this, it came into the ownership of Magnús Jónsson from Leirá (c. 1679–1702), a schoolmaster in Skálholt. According to his notes, Árni Magnússon received the manuscript from Magnús around the year 1700 and it remained in Copenhagen until 1991 when it was returned to Iceland. It is currently housed at the Árni Magnússon Institute for Icelandic Studies in Reykjavík, and a digitized version of the manuscript is available on Handrit.is.

== Illustrations ==
The manuscript contains numerous colorful illustrations, most of which depict subjects from Norse mythology. Other small decorative drawings appear in several places in the manuscript.

Sample images
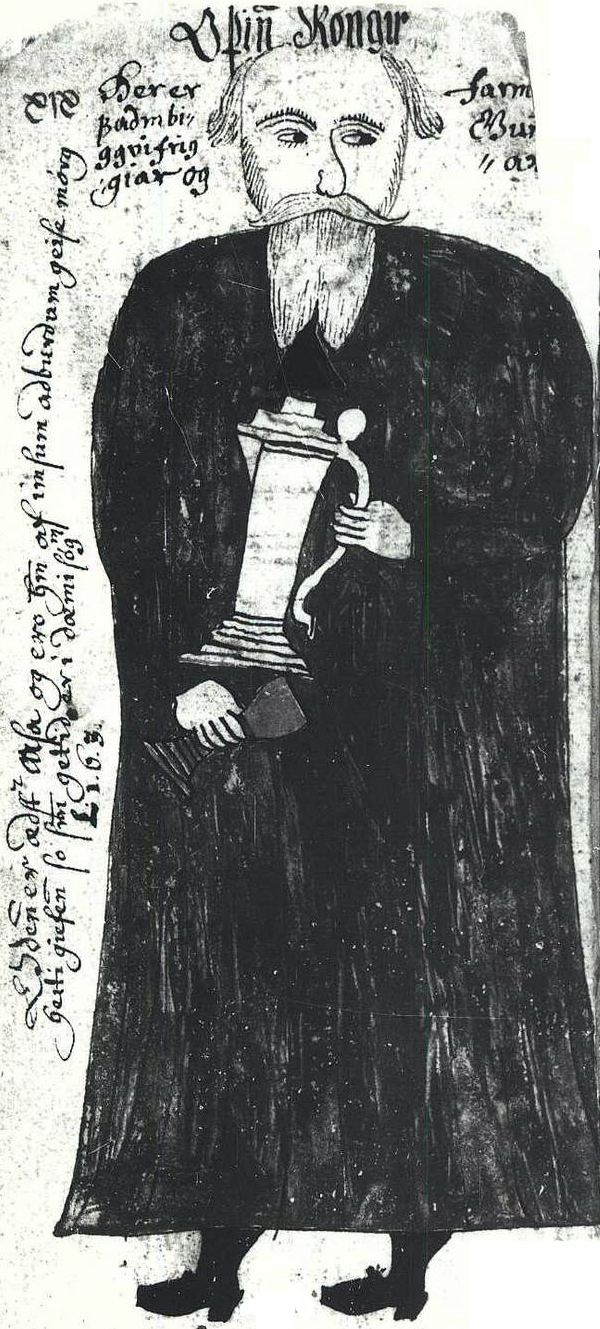
Odin

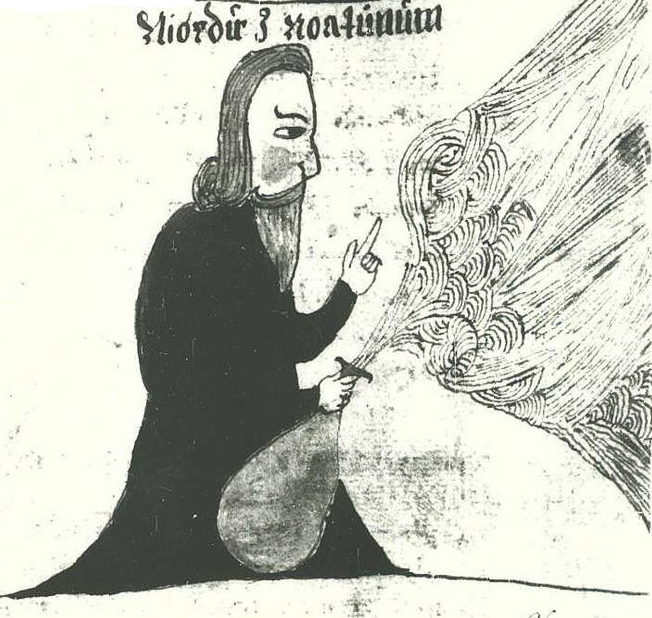
Njörðr

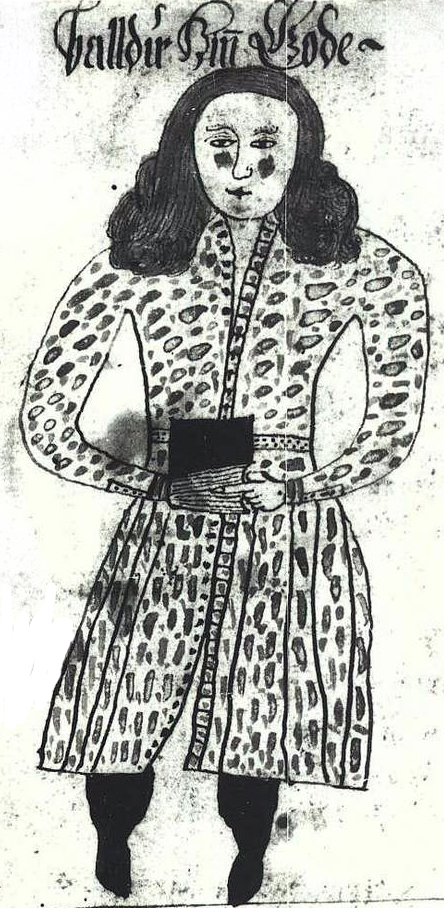
Baldr

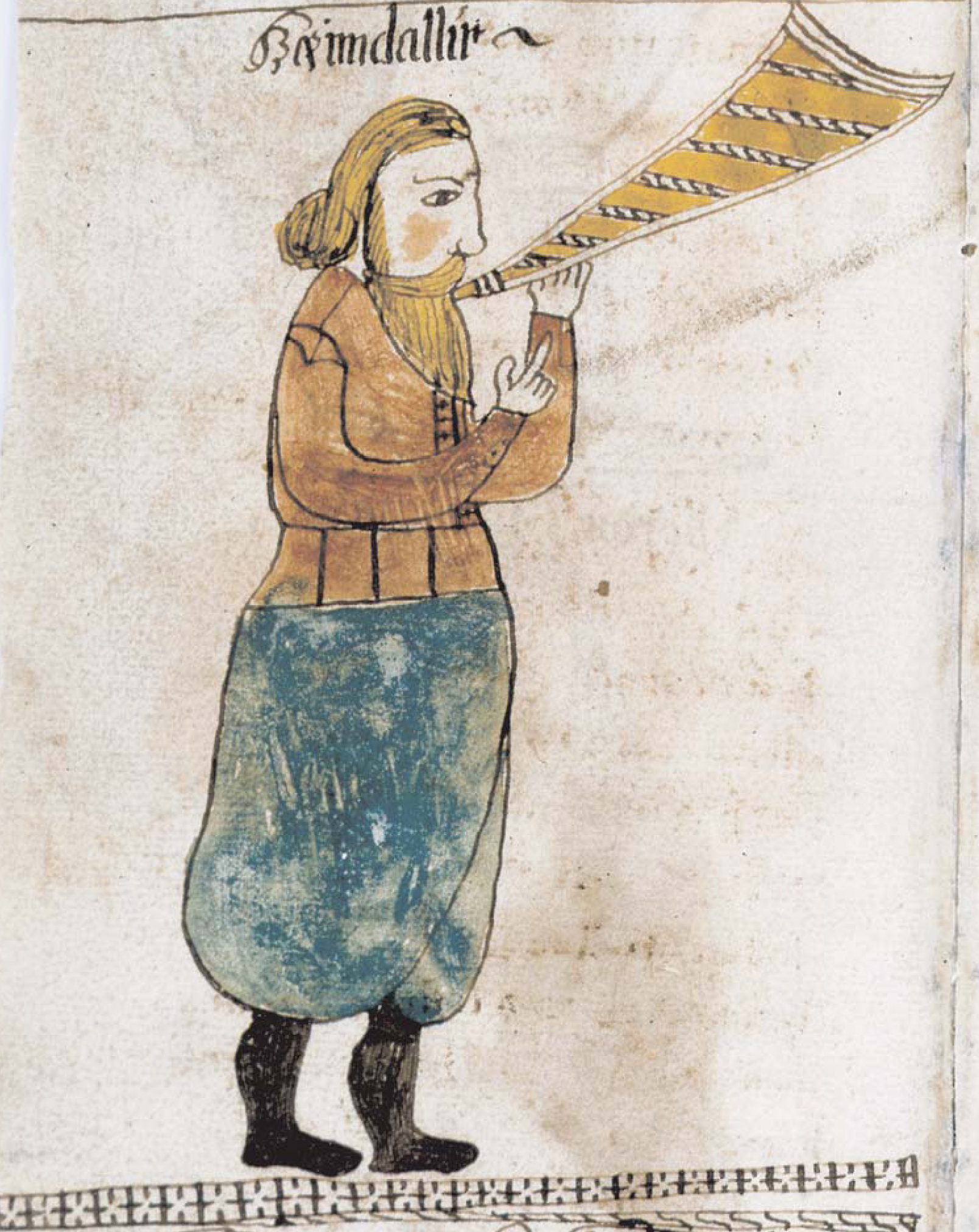
Heimdallr

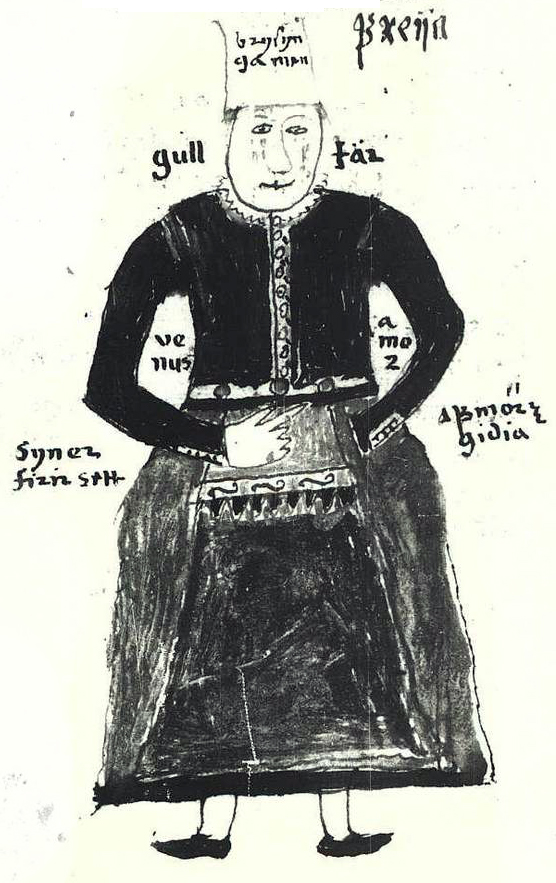
Freyja

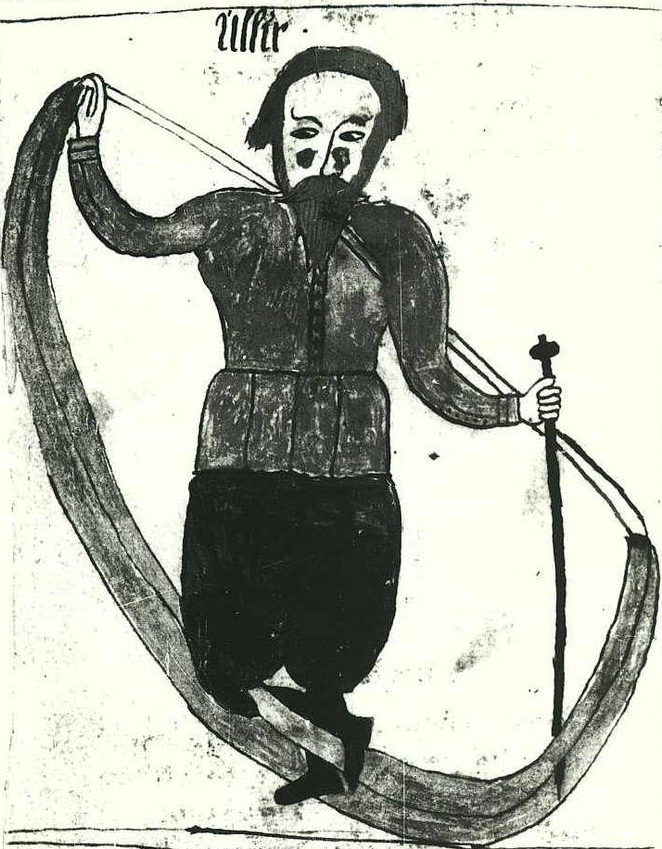
Ullr

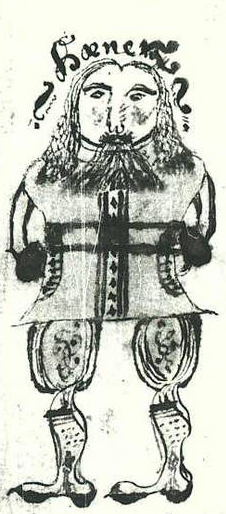
Hœnir

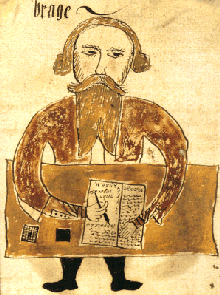
Bragi

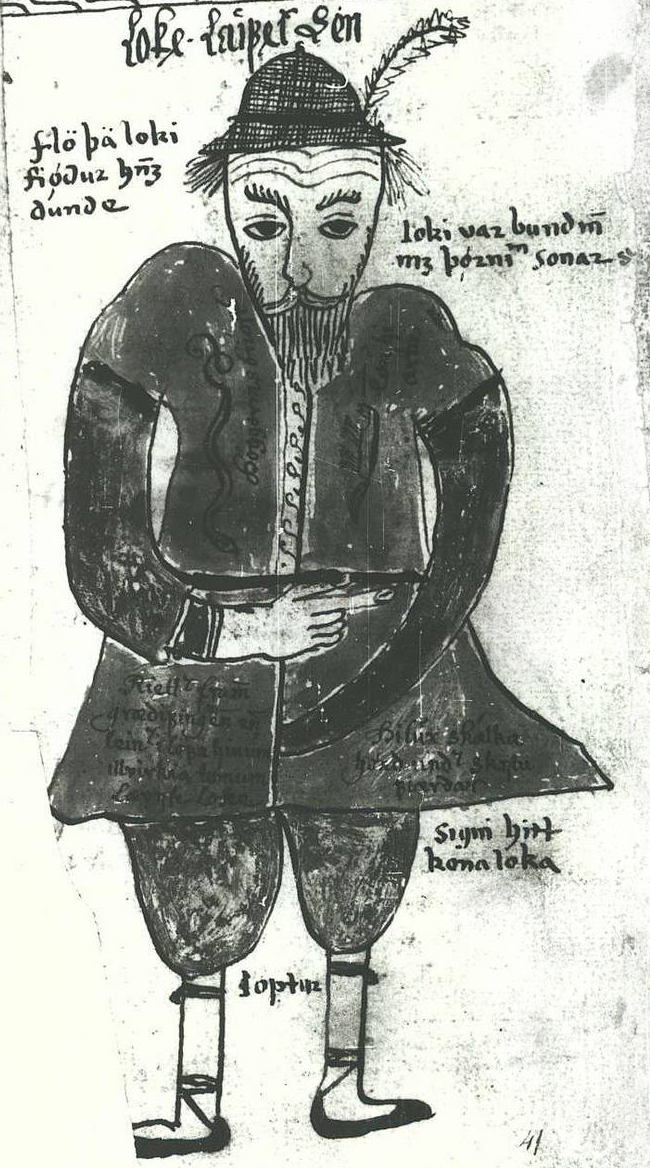
Loki

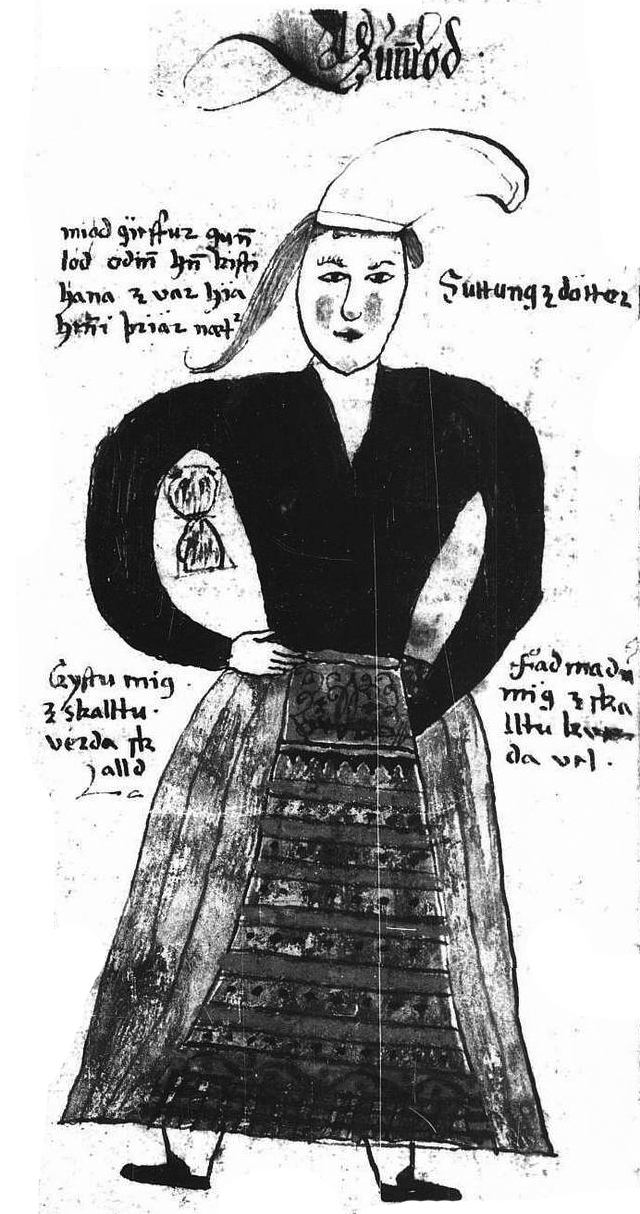
Gunnlöð

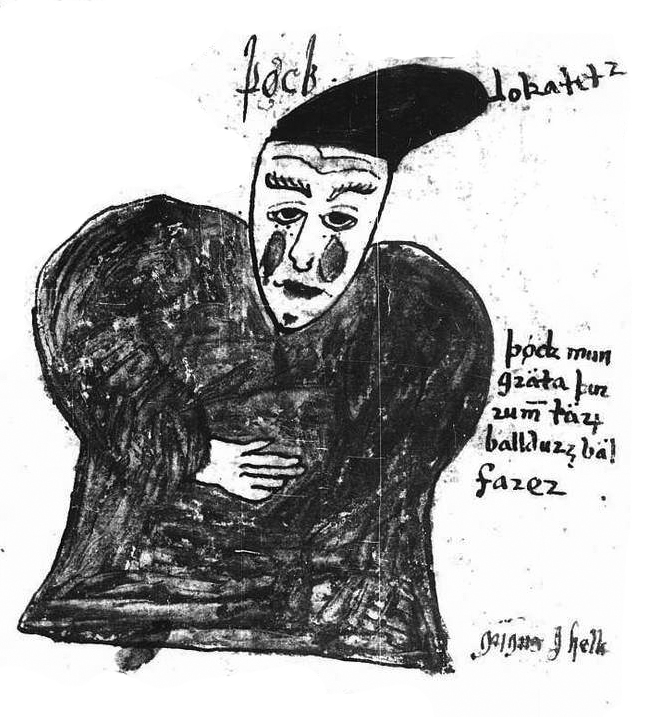
Þökk

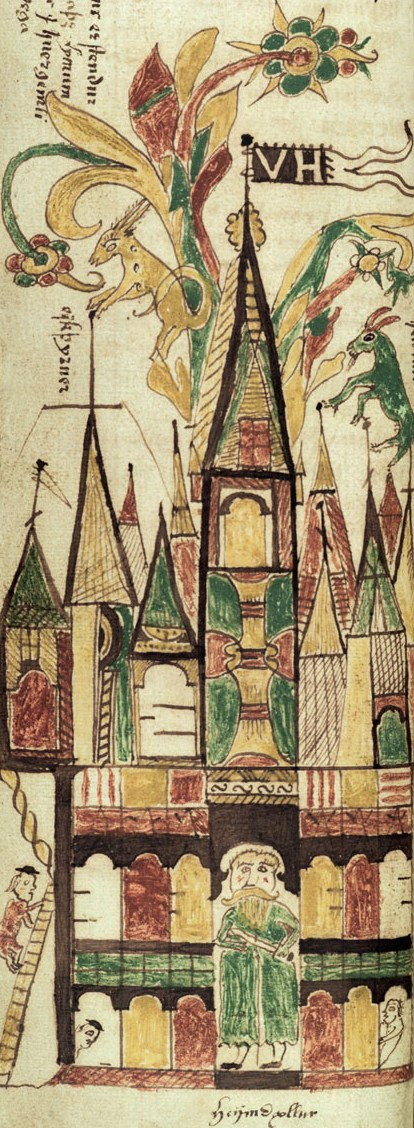
Valhöll

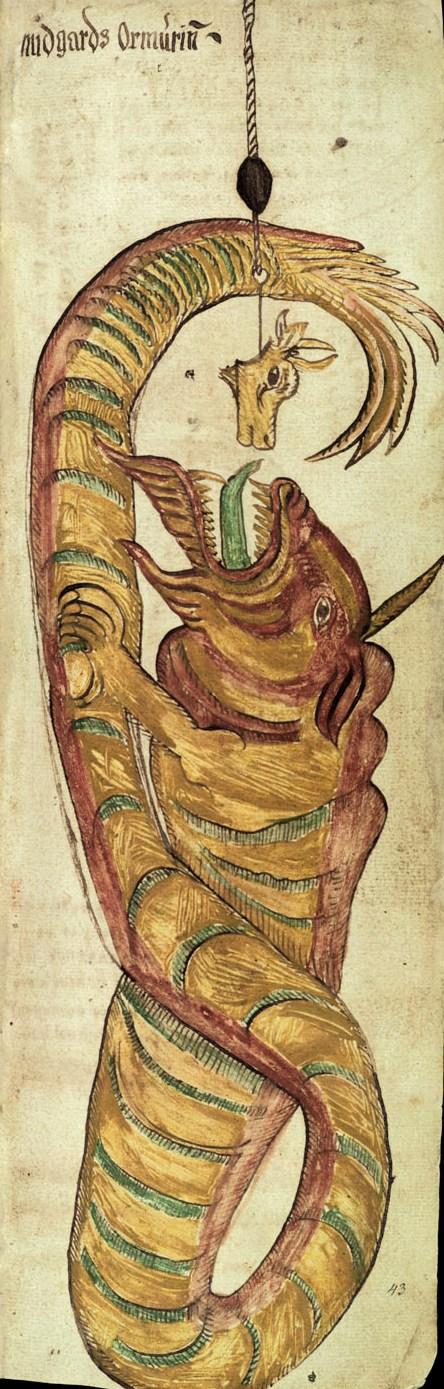
Jörmungandr

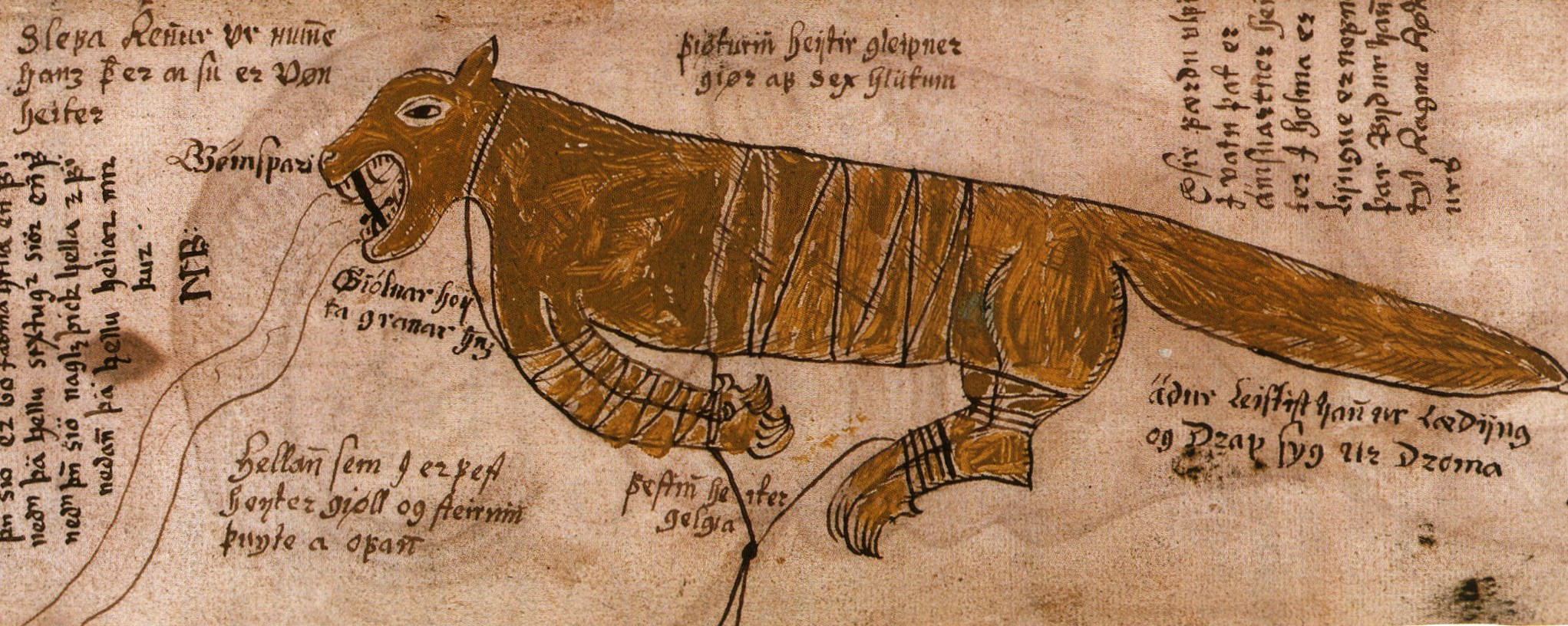
Fenrir

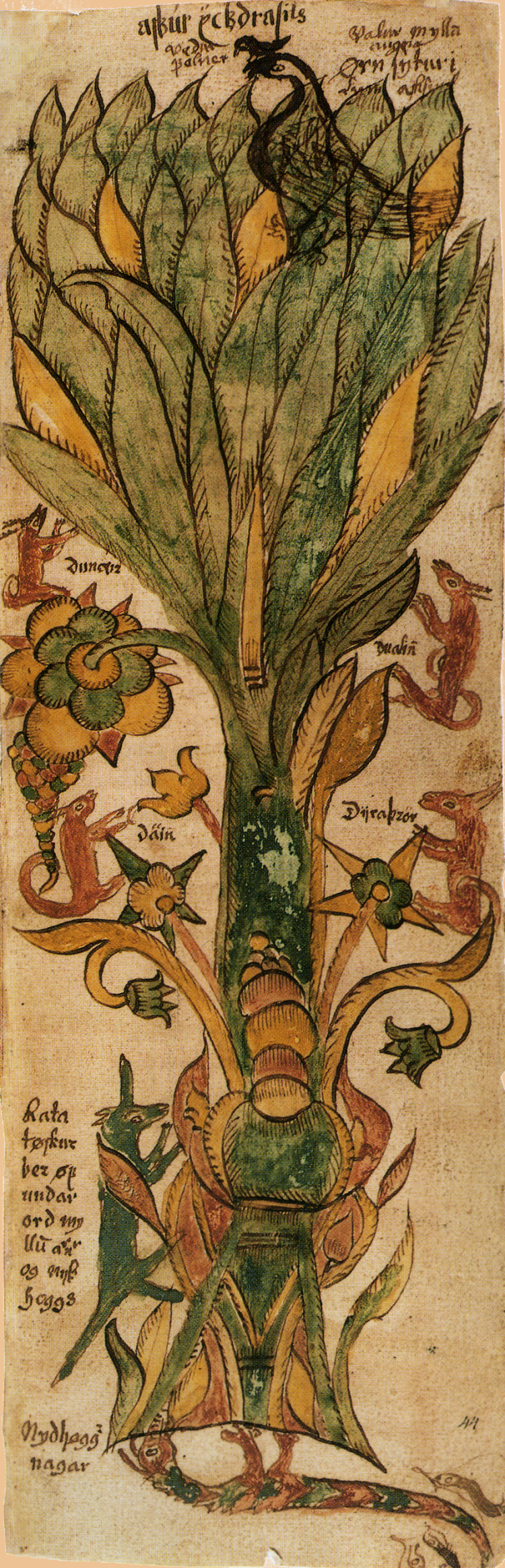
Yggdrasill
