= Heiðarvíga saga =

Icelandic saga

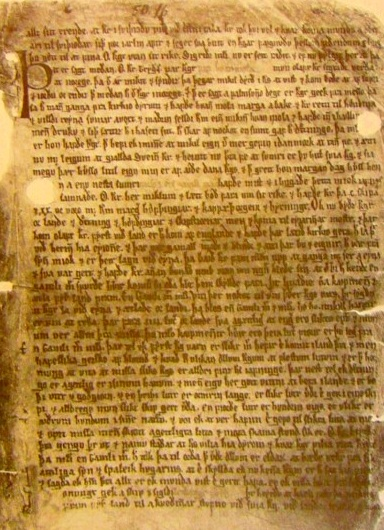
Heiðarvíga saga from a copy of the University of Copenhagen.

Heiðarvíga saga or The Story of the Heath-Slayings is one of the Icelanders' sagas. It is badly preserved; 12 leaves of the only surviving manuscript were destroyed along with their only copy in the fire of Copenhagen in 1728. The content of the destroyed portion is only known through a summary written from memory by Icelandic scholar Jón Grunnvíkingur (1705–1779). This is the only form in which the saga's contents survive today. The saga has been taken by some scholars as possibly among the oldest Icelanders' sagas.

The saga tells of the descendants of Egil Skallagrímsson and the long-standing disputes and conflicts which culminated in the battle and subsequent slayings on the heath, the eponymous Heath-Slayings (Heiðarvíg).

== Related reading ==
- Joanne Shortt Butler (2020) "Considering Otherness on the Page: How Do Lacunae Affect the Way We Interact with Saga Narrative?" in Merkelbach, Rebecca; Knight, Gwendolyne (eds.), Margins, Monsters, Deviants, Turnhout, Belgium: Brepols Publishers, pp. 129–156
- Jesse Byock (1993) Feud in the Icelandic Saga (University of California Press) ISBN 978-0520082595
- Viðar Hreinsson (1997) The complete sagas of Icelanders, including 49 tales (Leifur Eiríksson Pub) ISBN 978-9979929307
- Alexander Wilson (2022) "Dissonant Voices in the Prosimetrum of Heiðarvíga saga." In: Anna Katharina Heiniger, Rebecca Merkelbach, and Alexander Wilson (eds.). Þáttasyrpa — Studien zu Literatur, Kultur und Sprache in Nordeuropa. Tübingen: Narr Francke Attempto, 179–87.
