= Edward Wilson-Lee =

English literature academic

Edward Wilson-Lee is an English literature academic at Sidney Sussex College, Cambridge, and a specialist in the literature and the history of the book in the early modern period.

== Early life ==
Wilson-Lee is the son of wildlife conservationists, and was born in the same Midwest farming town as his father. He studied English at University College London, and completed a doctorate at Oxford and Cambridge.

== Personal life ==
He is married, with two sons, and lives in the Cambridge area.

== Selected publications ==
- Translation and the Book Trade in Early Modern Europe (2014). Cambridge University Press. (Edited with José María Pérez Fernández)
- Shakespeare in Swahililand: Adventures with the Ever-living Poet (2016). William Collins.
- The Catalogue of Shipwrecked Books: Young Columbus and the Quest for a Universal Library (2018). William Collins.
- A History of Water: Being an Account of a Murder, an Epic and Two Visions of Global History (2022). William Collins.
- A Grammar of Angels. A Search for the Magical Powers of Sublime Language. (2025). William Collins.

== Awards and honors ==
Shakespeare in Swahililand became a finalist of William Saroyan International Prize for Writing for non-fiction in 2018.

The Catalogue of Shipwrecked Books was shortlisted for the James Tait Black Memorial Prize in Biography and awarded the PEN Hessell-Tiltman Prize in 2019.

Wilson-Lee was named a Guggenheim Fellow in the category of General Nonfiction in 2022.

== See also ==
- Libro de los Epítomes
