= 1703 Icelandic census =

First census of Iceland

The Icelandic census of 1703 was the first census (Icelandic: manntal) of Iceland and the oldest complete census of any country that has survived. It was listed in UNESCO's Memory of the World international register in 2013.

== Procedure of the census ==
The census recorded the name, age, residence, and social standing of every inhabitant; it was the first such complete census. Those without fixed address were recorded under the place where they spent the night before Easter.

The census was assembled and organized by two Icelanders, Árni Magnússon, who had just been appointed a professor at the University of Copenhagen, and Páll Vídalín, sheriff and vice-lawman. They were commissioned in 1702 by King Frederick IV of Denmark to perform a complete survey of Iceland, then a Danish possession, in order to inventory its economic resources and propose improvements; this included the census as well as the Jarðabók or land register. The royal commission, dated 22 May 1702, listed the census in its Paragraph 8 and also required a count of livestock.

In October 1702, Árni and Páll wrote to the sheriffs of all the districts in Iceland with specifics of how the census survey was to be conducted. The instructions are more detailed than in the royal commission, showing that they had developed the idea. Árni's draft of this letter made in the spring states the census task as:

to assemble a true accounting of all families in that country, from the best to the lowest person, in which shall be specified and explained the husband's and the wife's name, their children, and relatives' names who at their home, also all servantmen, servant youths servantwomen and girls, in summa no one omitted great and small, young and old, who are to be found in the whole country, wherewith the large number of poor at each location must be precisely observed and described.

The district sheriffs delegated the task to the overseers of each poor-law district or commune (hreppr), of whom there were 3–5 in each of the 163 communes, and they therefore performed the count. This diverged from the instructions of the king, who had stated that the parish priests were to perform the census, but Árni and Páll presumably thought it would be more efficient to use the secular administration and to present the task to the magistrates in the Althing, and the magistrates then decided to pass it to the communes, the next level of government.

The count was made between December 1702 and June 1703, in most places in March and April. Icelanders were aware of the uniqueness of the census, and referred to the winter of 1702/03 as "census winter". The census record for each district has been preserved, although in some cases the original document has been lost.

The census report was presented in the Althing in June 1703 and then sent by Árni and Páll to Copenhagen, where it was largely ignored until 1777, when the king's representative, Skúli Magnússon, decided to use it to derive a land survey. The documents were loaned to Iceland in 1921 to be prepared for publication, and in 1927 under the terms of an agreement between Iceland and Denmark became the property of Iceland. They are preserved at the Icelandic National Archives. The livestock survey is also preserved, but is incomplete, although Skúli Magnússon's description of Iceland includes figures for each district. The livestock register has not been published.

== Iceland's population in 1703 ==
In association with the publication of the census, Statistics Iceland derived the following information about the population of Iceland at that time:

- Total population: 50,358

- Males: 22,867
- Females: 27,491

- South farthing: 15,564
- Westfjord farthing: 17,831
- North farthing: 11,777
- Eastfjord farthing: 5,186

The census is almost completely accurate; only 497 people are registered twice, and no commune is missing, although later studies have shown some small omissions, for example the island of Viðey in Kollafjörður Bay, which definitely had residents at the time. It is also suspected that some young children were omitted, although it is conceivable that the lack of children under 8 is due to difficult years preceding the taking of the census; the overall age distribution of the census is very uneven. The large difference between the numbers of males and females is notable. Research shows that men fared worse in famines, partly because they carried a heavier burden of physical work. In addition, infant mortality was higher than it would have been because Icelandic mothers, even more than other European countries at the time, customarily did not breastfeed their babies. The census also reveals an unusually high number of single people and high age at first marriage; only 58% of women aged 40–59 had ever married. The rate of illegitimacy was also high, and Iceland had a tradition of unmarried cohabitation, but the main reason for the low marriage rate was that repeated famines made it difficult to support a family. Additionally, servants were not expected to marry; their children would be paupers, and it is possible that separated and widowed people, particularly those who had become servants or paupers, were recorded as never having married.

The census recorded 8,191 households, slightly more than 7,000 headed by a man and approximately 1,100 headed by a woman (13.8% of farms were managed by a woman, an unusually high percentage), in the following categories (which probably overlapped somewhat in practice):

- Main farms: 5,915
- Outlying farms: 1,181
- Cottages (inhabited by cotters living entirely or mostly from fishing rather than farming): 343
- Lodgers (mostly single people, almost evenly split between men and women): 752

== Recognition ==
In 2003, Statistics Iceland and the National Archives organised a conference to mark the 300th anniversary of the 1703 census.

In 2013, UNESCO added the census manuscripts to its Memory of the World international register, recognising them as globally important heritage.

== Sources ==
- Árni Magnússon and Páll Vidalín. Manntal á Íslandi árið 1703: Ásamt manntali 1729 í þrem sýslum. Hagstofa Íslands. Reykjavík: Gutenberg, 1924–47. OCLC 607579840.
- John Bearnson. Index to Icelandic Census 1703. Springville, Utah: Springville Stake, The Church of Jesus Christ of Latter-day Saints, 1968. OCLC 78458369
- Ólöf Garðarsdóttir and Eiríkur G. Guðmundsson, eds. Manntalið 1703 þrjú hundruð ára: Greinar í tilefni afmælis. Reykjavík: Hagstofa Íslands, 2005, ISBN 9979-876-06-9 (in Icelandic) - Proceedings of the 2003 conference
