= Ferdinand Columbus =

Spanish bibliophile and cosmographer, son of Christopher Columbus

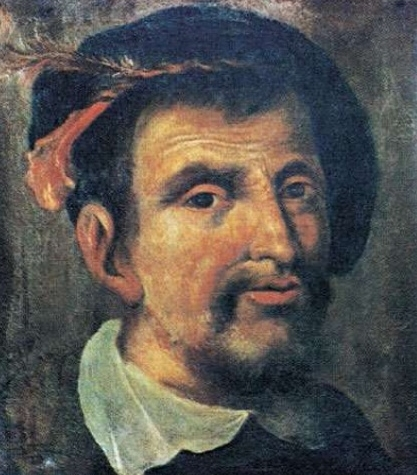
- Born: 15 August 1488; Cordoba, Castile
- Died: 12 July 1539 (aged 50); Genoa, Republic of Genoa
- Parent(s): Christopher Columbus; Beatriz Enríquez de Arana

Ferdinand Columbus (Spanish: Fernando or Hernando Colón; Portuguese: Fernando Colombo; Italian: Fernando Colombo; 15 August 1488 – 12 July 1539) was a Spanish bibliographer and cosmographer, the second son of Christopher Columbus. His mother was Beatriz Enriquez de Arana, whom his father never married.

== Biography ==
Ferdinand Columbus was born in Córdoba, Spain on 15 August 1488, the son of Christopher Columbus and Beatriz Enríquez de Arana. He had one brother, Diego Columbus, from his father's earlier marriage. Ferdinand's parents never married, possibly because the Arana family lacked the social standing that was important to Columbus's ambitions. Fernando's illegitimacy was never an impediment to his advancement. His father legally recognized him and contemporary social norms were tolerant of children born out of wedlock.

When Ferdinand was born, Columbus was not yet the famous explorer, spending much of his time at the royal court of Ferdinand II of Aragon and Isabella I of Castile where he hoped to gain their support for his proposed voyage across the Atlantic to the Indies. Meanwhile, Fernando and his brother Diego were raised by Beatriz and her family in Cordoba for the next few years. When Columbus returned from his first voyage in 1493, he instantly won fame and honors. In March 1494, Ferdinand and his brother were presented at court in Valladolid where they were appointed to serve as pages in the retinue of Prince Juan, a significant honor and a sign of their father's standing at court.

Even though Ferdinand had only a minor role in a retinue of more than 200 persons, he did benefit from the education that was provided for the prince and his court. He received training in theology, Latin and Spanish grammar, history, philosophy, and music. Instruction was provided by notable humanists and theologians including Antonio de Nebrija and Peter Martyr d'Anghiera. Ferdinand excelled in his studies and may have become something like an apprentice to Peter Martyr. After the young prince died unexpectedly in 1497, Ferdinand became a page for Queen Isabella, enabling him to continue with his education.

In 1500, Fernando's father returned from his third voyage, under arrest for mismanagement of the colony at Hispaniola. The Crown called it a misunderstanding and ordered his immediate release but it was clear that his standing at court was at a low point. Anxious to lead a fourth voyage and redeem his reputation, he worked with Fernando and the Carthusian monk Gaspar Goricio to assemble a manuscript called the Book of Prophecies (Libro de las profecias). It was an eclectic collection of biblical texts, quotes from ancient authorities and commentaries designed to show that Columbus's work was part of God's design to spread Christianity and recapture Jerusalem. Fernando had a hand in development of the text, but the extent of his contributions has been widely debated.

By 1502, Columbus won approval from the Crown for a fourth voyage with the goal of finding a western route to the Indian Ocean. Fernando, at age thirteen, accompanied his father when the small fleet of four ships left Cadiz on 9 May 1502. Fernando's role on this voyage is not known, but he retained his position as a royal page and received a daily allowance of 164 maravedís—an extravagant sum for a nine-year-old page. This fourth and final voyage turned out to be the most dangerous and difficult. While exploring the Central American coast from Honduras to Panama, they were beset by storms, disease, mutiny, and battles with hostile natives. After losing one ship, they attempted to return to Hispaniola for much needed repairs but another storm marooned them on Jamaica where they waited for nearly a year before being rescued and brought to Hispaniola in August 1504. Fernando and his father embarked for Spain in September 1504.

When they reached Seville in November 1504, Fernando remained to care for his father who was very ill. The expedition had been a failure, and later that month they received word that Isabella had died. It was a blow for both father and son because the queen had been their most important patron. In May 1506, Columbus died. Contrary to popular legend, Fernando's father was not a pauper when he died but a wealthy man. The brothers inherited a sizable estate and Diego, as the first-born son, received his father's titles and privileges. However, the extent and value of these honors was very much in doubt and would require years of litigation.

Ferdinand did not return to court after his father's death. Instead he focused his efforts on the legal battles to enforce the agreements with the crown that granted to Columbus and his descendants extensive rights and privileges in the New World. Diego would be the primary beneficiary, but Fernando felt it was a matter of family honor and loyalty. The first series of lawsuits and petitions (known as the pleitos colombinos) began in 1508 and lasted until 1536. In July 1509 Fernando accompanied Diego to Hispaniola when his brother had been named governor. Fernando remained only a couple months and then returned to Spain to continue the lawsuits on behalf of the family.

== Library ==
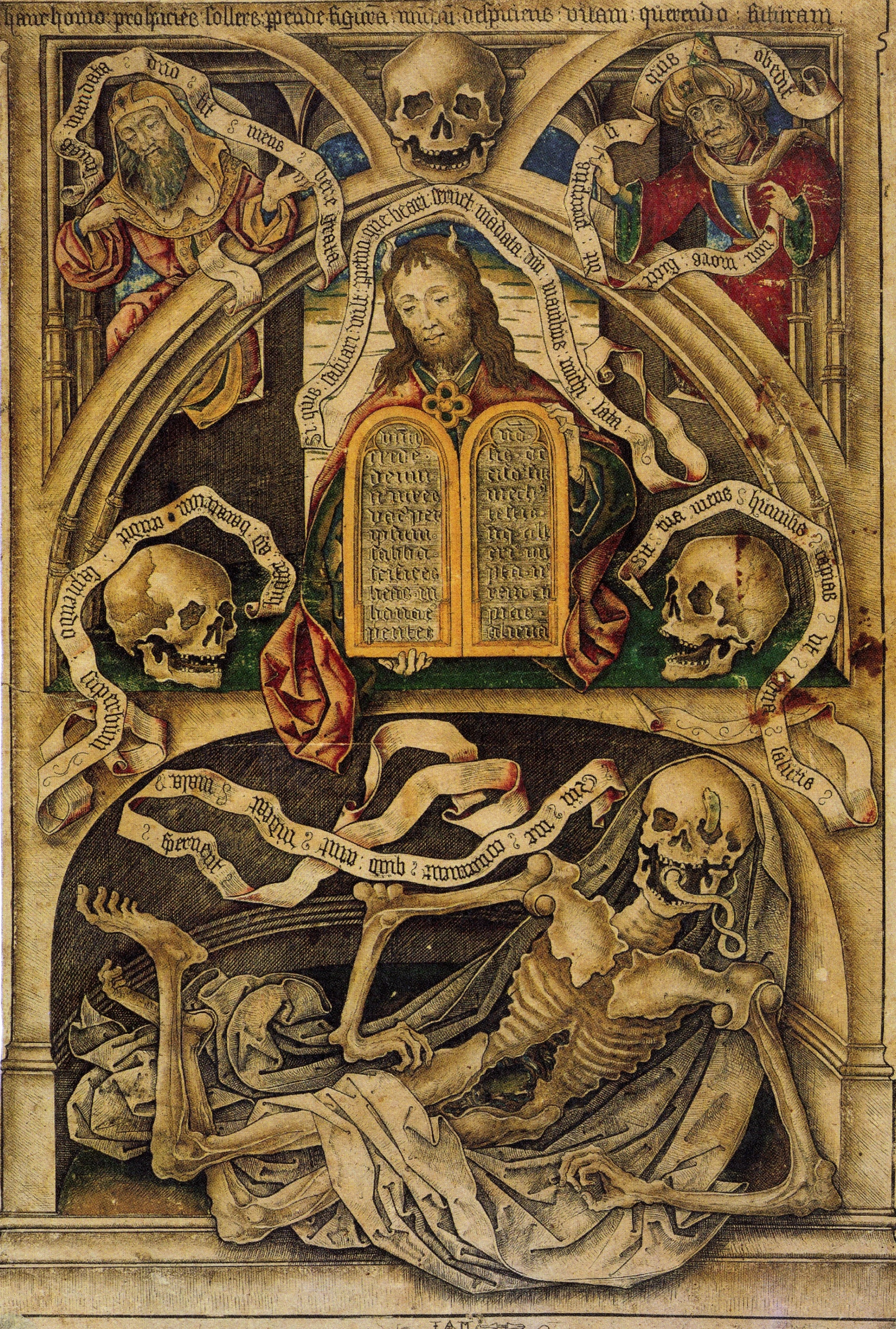
Allegory of the Transience of Life (ca. 1480–90), 33.3 x 22.6 cm, engraving printed on vellum. In the collection of the British Museum. This print by the anonymous fifteenth century engraver Master I. A. M. of Zwolle is one example of the early prints collected by Columbus.

As an adult, Columbus was known as a scholar. He had a generous income from his father's New World demesne and used a sizeable fraction of it to buy books. Columbus travelled extensively around Europe to gather books, eventually amassing a personal library of over 15,000 volumes. This library was patronized by educated people in Spain and elsewhere, including the Dutch philosopher Erasmus.

- First, Columbus personally noted each and every book that he or his associates acquired by listing the date of purchase, the location and how much was paid. Columbus had his associates prepare summaries of each book in his collection and devised a hieroglyphic blueprint of his library. In 2013, history professor Guy Lazure serendipitously stumbled upon the massive catalog, known as the Libro de los Epítomes, long thought lost and consisting of 973 leaves of paper, while conducting unrelated research.
- Secondly, he sought to take advantage of a recent technological development by devoting the bulk of his purchases to printed books instead of manuscripts. As a result, the library acquired a sizeable number (currently 1,194 titles) of incunabula, or books printed in the years 1453–1500.
- Third, he employed full-time librarians who, as the scholar Klaus Wagner noted, were required to live on the premises to ensure that their top priority would be the library itself.

Ferdinand Columbus inherited his father's personal library. What remains of these volumes contains much valuable information on Christopher Columbus, his interests, and his explorations.

Provisions were made in Ferdinand Columbus's will to ensure that the library would be maintained after his death, specifically that the collection would not be sold and that more books would be purchased. However, his nephew who inherited the collection took no interest in it and left it abandoned for five years in Maria de Toledo. Even once the collection was transferred from Maria de Toledo, first to San Pablo and then to the Seville Cathedral (Ferdinand's second choice for inheritance of the books), the collection fell victim to destruction during the Inquisition as well as poor storage conditions.

During this time of disputed ownership, the library's size was reduced to about 7,000 titles. This gradually was reduced to fewer than 4,000 books, around a quarter of the initial library. However, what remains of Ferdinand Columbus's library continues to be maintained at the Seville Cathedral. Today, a part of the Biblioteca Colombina, it is accessible for consultation by scholars, students, and bibliophiles alike.

The Libro de los Epítomes or book of summaries of Columbus' collection was found and identified in the Arnamagnæan Collection at the University of Copenhagen in 2013.

In 2019, a 500-year-old catalog belonging to Ferdinand Columbus was discovered by Guy Lazure, Professor of History at the University of Windsor. Columbus held the largest collection in sixteenth-century Europe, and the 2,000-page bibliography has no title page or identifying information, marking it virtually impossible to identify.

== Print collection ==
Ferdinand Columbus was also a large-scale collector of old master prints and popular prints. More remarkable than the size of his collection, though at some 3,200 prints it is large, is the catalogue with meticulous descriptions that he had his secretaries make. It is the "oldest-known catalogue of print collection and shows a surprisingly well thought out structure, relying on combination of subject-matter, size and typology, combined with a more literal description of the image." This survives, although the collection itself has long gone, presumably dispersed at an early date. This manuscript catalogue was published by Mark P. McDonald in 2004, with a single volume monograph the next year (see References).

== Biography of father ==
Columbus wrote a biography of his father in Spanish that was translated into Italian, Historie del S. D. Fernando Colombo; nelle quali s'ha particolare, & vera relatione della vita, & de fatti dell'Ammiraglio D. Cristoforo Colombo, suo padre: Et dello scoprimento ch'egli fece dell'Indie Occidentali, dette Mondo Nuovo (The life of the Admiral Christopher Columbus by his son Ferdinand).

In the first paragraph of page 3 of Benjamin Keen's translation, Columbus dismissed the fanciful story that his father descended from the Colonus mentioned by Tacitus. However, he refers to "those two illustrious Coloni, his relatives". According to Note 1, on page 287, the two "were corsairs not related to each other or to Christopher Columbus, one being Guillame de Casenove, nicknamed Colombo, Admiral of France in the reign of Louis XI". At the top of page 4, Columbus listed Nervi, Cugureo, Bugiasco, Savona, Genoa and Piacenza (all inside the former Republic of Genoa) as possible places of origin. He also stated:

Colombo... was really the name of his ancestors. But he changed it in order to make it conform to the language of the country in which he came to reside and raise a new estate.

The publication of Historie has been used by historians as providing indirect evidence about the Genoese origin of his father. Columbus's manuscript was eventually inherited by his playboy nephew, Luis, who was always short of money and sold the manuscript to Baliano de Fornari, "a wealthy and public-spirited Genoese physician". On page xv, Keen wrote, "In the depth of winter the aged Fornari set out for Venice, the publishing center of Italy, to supervise the translation and publication of the book".

On page xxiv, the 25 April 1571 dedication by Giuseppe Moleto states:

Your Lordship [Fornari], then, being an honorable and generous gentleman, desiring to make immortal the memory of this great man, heedless of your Lordship's seventy years, of the season of the year, and of the length of the journey, came from Genoa to Venice with the aim of publishing the aforementioned book ... that the exploits of this eminent man, the true glory of Italy and especially of your Lordship's native city, might be made known.

== Death ==
Fernando Colón died at Seville on 12 July 1539 and is buried in the Cathedral of Seville.
