= Grunnavík =

Bay in Iceland

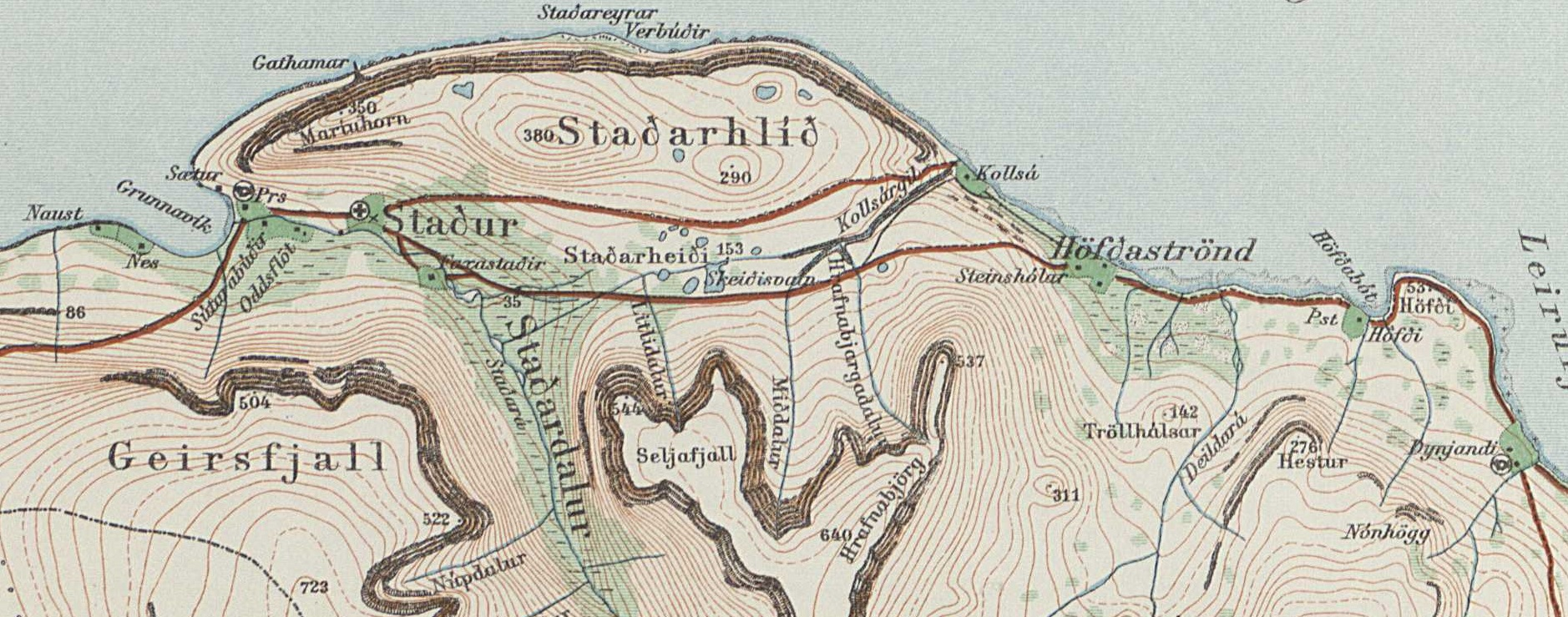

Grunnavík (Icelandic pronunciation: [ˈkrʏnːaˌviːk]) is a bay (vík) at the mouth of Jökulfirðir, in Westfjords, Iceland, located some 12 km to the ENE of Bolungarvík. Grunnavík was permanently inhabited up to 1962, but is today only occupied seasonally, as a summer resort.
