= Institución Colombina =

Group of libraries and archives in Seville, Spain

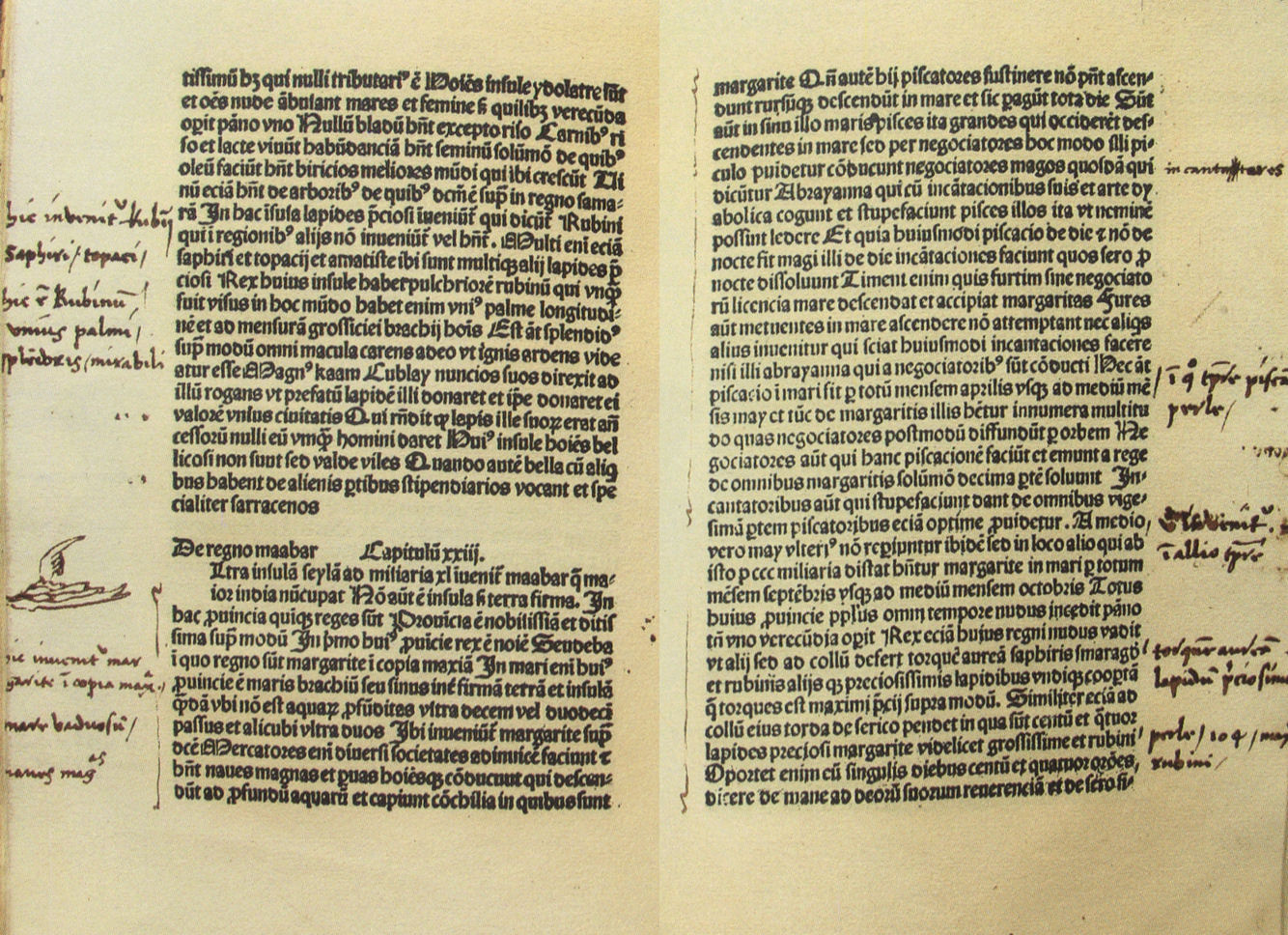
Christopher Columbus's notes on The Travels of Marco Polo are visible in the margins. The book is found in the Biblioteca Colombina.

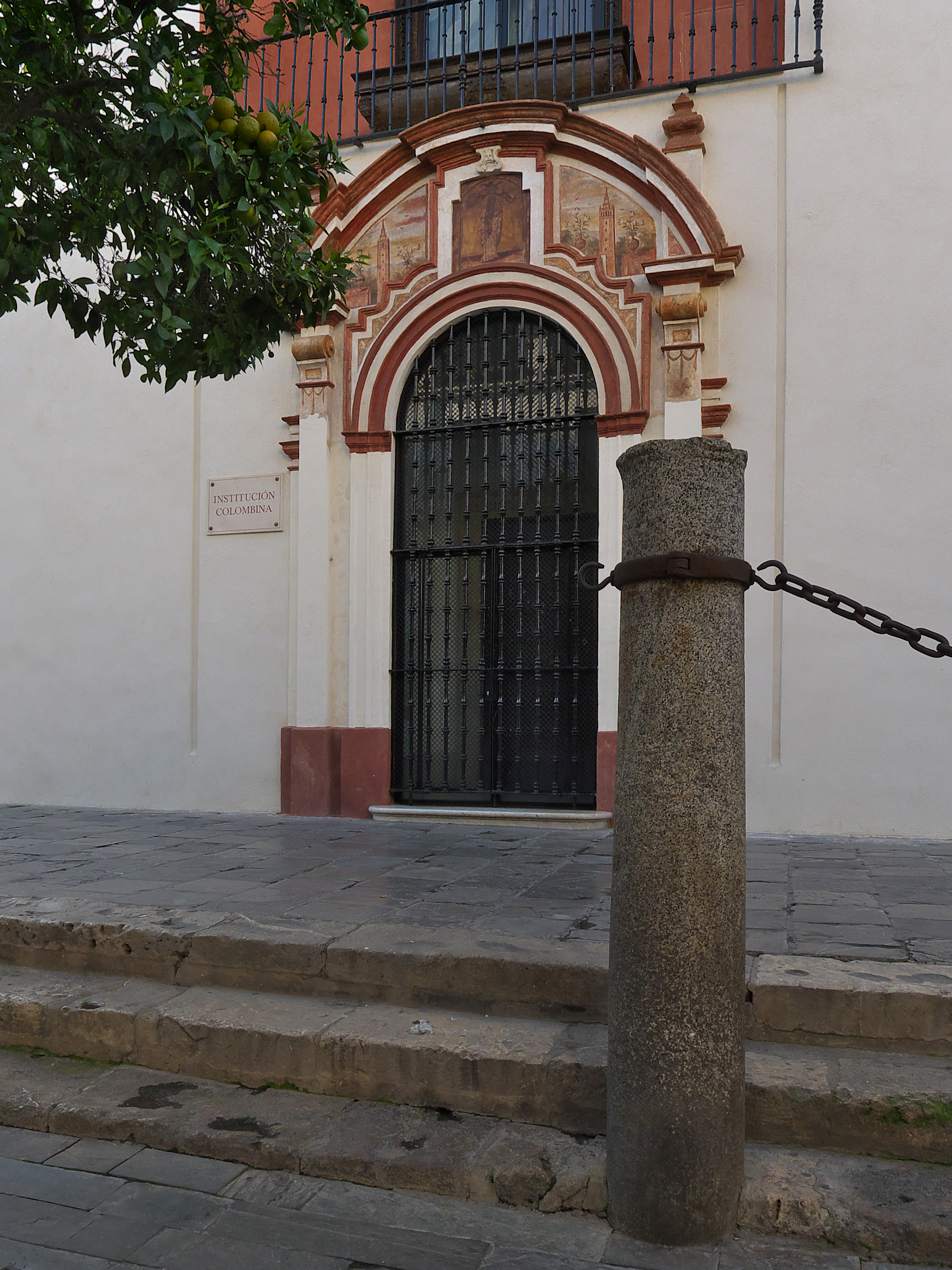
Portal of the Institución Colombina (Seville)

The Institución Colombina, situated in Seville, Spain, is the modern-day administrative branch that comprises the Biblioteca Capitular, the Biblioteca Colombina, the Cathedral Archives (el Archivo de la Catedral), Library of the Archbishopric (la Biblioteca del Arzobispado) and the General Archive of the Archbishopric (el Archivo General del Arzobispado). The Biblioteca Capitular and the Biblioteca Colombina are private libraries and are not supported financially by the Spanish government, but by the Fundación Cristóbal Colón and the Institución Colombina.

== Biblioteca Colombina ==
The Biblioteca Colombina is situated on the east side of the Patio de los Naranjos. It was enriched by a bequest from Fernando Colón. The library contains incunabula and rare works on the discovery of America. It contains manuscripts written by Christopher Columbus himself.

=== History of the Biblioteca Colombina ===
As an adult, Fernando was known as a scholar. He had a generous income from his father's New World demesne, and used a sizable fraction of it to buy books, eventually amassing a personal library of over 15,000 volumes. This library was patronized by educated people in Spain and elsewhere, including the Dutch philosopher Erasmus.

Apart from its size, the library was unique in several ways. First, Fernando personally noted each and every book that he or his associates acquired by listing the date of purchase, the location and how much was paid. Secondly, he sought to take advantage of a recent technological development by devoting the bulk of his purchases to printed books instead of manuscripts. As a result, the library acquired a sizable number (currently 1,194 titles) of incunabula, books printed between 1453 and 1500. Third, he employed full-time librarians who, as the scholar Klaus Wagner noted, were required to live on the premise in order to ensure that their top priority would be the library itself. After his father's death, Fernando inherited Columbus' personal library, and what remains of these volumes contains much valuable information on Columbus, his interests, and his explorations.

Provisions were made in his will to ensure that the library would be maintained after his death, specifically that the collection would not be sold and that more books would be purchased. Despite this precaution, the ownership of the library was contested for several decades after Fernando's death until it passed into the hands of the Cathedral in Seville, Spain.

During this time of disputed ownership, the size of the library was reduced to about 7,000 titles. However the library, renamed the Biblioteca Colombina, has been well maintained by the Cathedral and today it is accessible for consultation by scholars, students and bibliophiles alike.

== Biblioteca Capitular ==
The Biblioteca Capitular was founded after Seville was conquered in 1248 by Fernando III of Castile. Alfonso donated part of his personal library to the cathedral; this was the start of this library.
