= Giuseppe Moletti =

Italian mathematician

Giuseppe Moletti (Note: His name is also spelled Moleti, Moleta, Moleto and Molati (Favino 2011).) (1531–1588) was an Italian mathematician best known for his Dialogo intorno alla Meccanica (Dialogue on Mechanics). Though an obscure figure today, he was a renowned mathematician during his lifetime, and was even consulted by Pope Gregory XIII on his new calendar.

He held the mathematics chair at the University of Padua, preceding Galileo, who had sent him his theorems on the centre of gravity.

== Dialogo intorno alla Meccanica ==
In his Dialogo intorno alla Meccanica (Dialogue on Mechanics), Moletti "intended to establish its Euclidean foundations...[and] to extend mechanics generally to explain all motions through the analysis of their forces and resistances". He defined mechanics as the science of overcoming greater forces with smaller ones. On the first day of dialogue, he offers geometrical foundations for the Pseudo-Aristotelian Mechanical Problems, establishing the principle that the further a weight is from the centre of a pivoting lever, the less force is required to move it in a circular motion. He used geometry and angles of force to discuss and solve mechanical problems. He thereby sought to relate motion to mathematical laws, though he did not envision mathematics as a universal science of motion. The second day discusses problems of natural philosophy, especially the acceleration of falling bodies.

== Other works ==
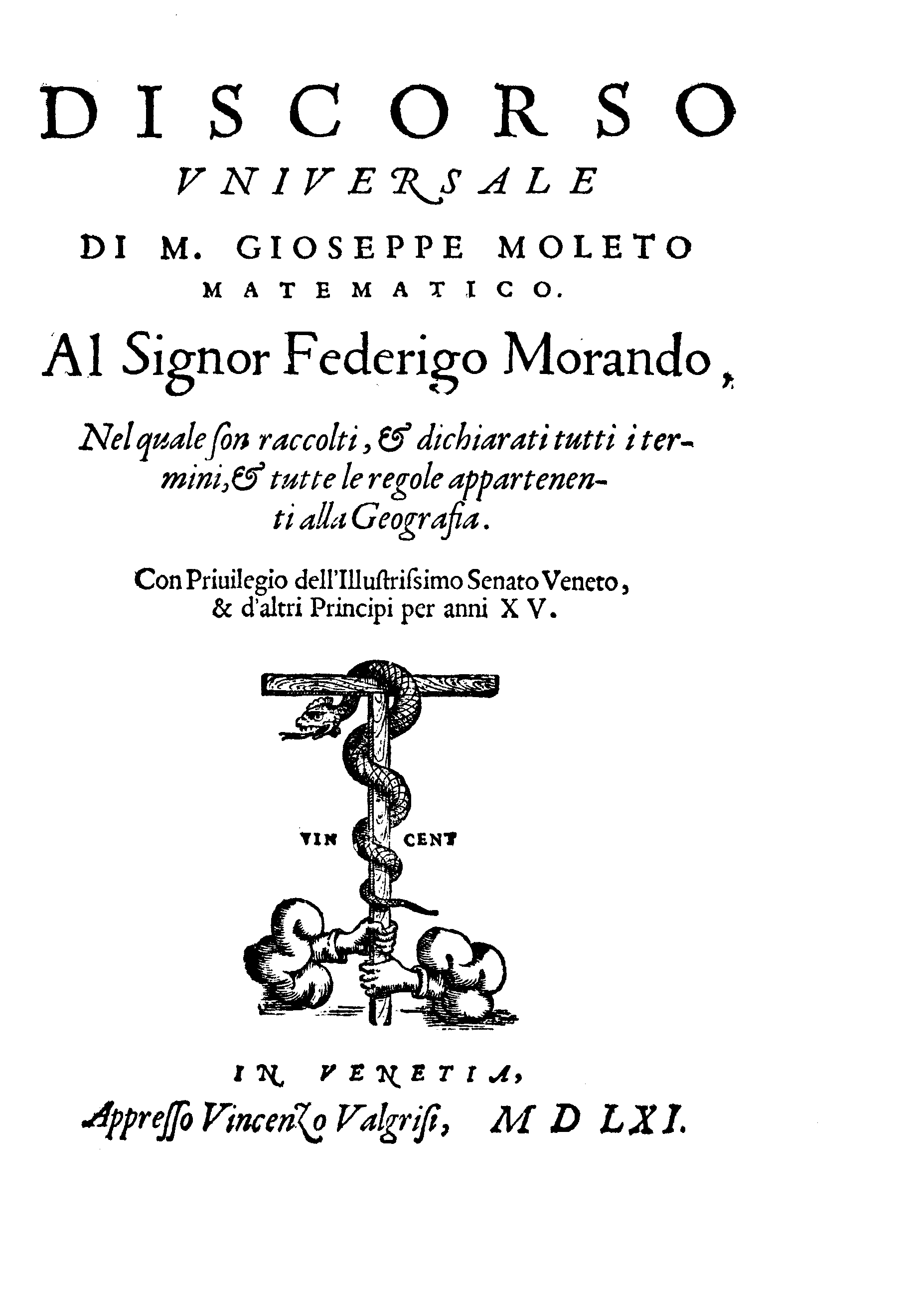
Discorso universale nel quale son raccolti et dichiarati tutti i termini et tutte le regole appartenenti alla geografia, 1573

Moletti was a prolific writer, though many of his writings remained unpublished. He lived in the generation before Galileo and anticipated Galileo's experiments that heavy bodies of different weights fell at the same rate. Also that “what makes a body hard to move also makes it hard to stop”, which is related to its mass, and to what later became the law of inertia. He also wrote a book of astronomical tables, another on mathematical certainty, and a work on reform of the calendar. His unpublished notes contain commentaries on Euclid's Elements, Archimedes’ Sphere and Cylinder, Alhazen's Optics, Sacrobosco's Tractatus de Sphaera, Mechanical Problems and Copernicus' De revolutionibus. He was also working on an introduction to astrology, and on the celestial spheres. His practical papers include notes on an instrument for measuring distance, a horologium, on fortifications and on practical perspective.

- Moleti, Giuseppe (1561). Discorso universale nel quale son raccolti et dichiarati tutti i termini et tutte le regole appartenenti alla geografia (in Italian). Venezia: Giordano Ziletti (1.).
- Moleti, Giuseppe (1573). Discorso universale nel quale son raccolti et dichiarati tutti i termini et tutte le regole appartenenti alla geografia (in Italian). Venezia: Vincenzo Valgrisi.

== Sources ==
- Favino, Federica (2011). "Moleti, Giuseppe". Dizionario Biografico degli Italiani, Volume 75: Miranda–Montano (in Italian). Rome: Istituto dell'Enciclopedia Italiana. ISBN 978-8-81200032-6.
- Laird, Walter Roy (2000). The Unfinished Mechanics of Giuseppe Moletti. University of Toronto Press. ISBN 0-8020-4699-1.
