= Arnamagnæan Institute =

Institute in Copenhagen for the study of Icelandic manuscripts

Coordinates: 55.6627°N 12.5925°E

The Arnamagnæan Institute (Danish: Den Arnamagnæanske Samling, formerly Det Arnamagnæanske Institut) is a teaching and research institute established in 1956 to further the study of the manuscripts in the Arnamagnæan Manuscript Collection, the collection bequeathed by the Icelandic scholar and antiquarian Árni Magnússon to the University of Copenhagen in 1730.

== History and function ==
On 1 July 2003 the Arnamagnæan Institute joined with the institutes for Danish dialectology (Danish: Institut for Dialektforskning) and onomastics (Danish: Institut for Navneforskning) to form The Department of Scandinavian Research (Danish: Nordisk Forskningsinstitut), part of the University of Copenhagen Faculty of Humanities. In September 2017, the Department of Scandinavian Research was merged with the Department of Nordic Studies and Linguistics (Danish: Institut for Nordiske Studier og Sprogvidenskab).

The Arnamagnæan Commission (Danish: Den Arnamagnæanske Kommission), created in 1772, is the administering body of the Arnamagnæan Foundation (Danish: Det Arnamagnæanske Legat, Latin: Legati Arnæ-Magnæani), the endowment from Árni Magnússon's private estate from which money was to be drawn for the publication of text editions and studies pertaining to the manuscripts in the collection.

The chief function of The Arnamagnæan Institute is to preserve and further the study of the manuscripts in the Arnamagnæan Manuscript Collection, in accordance with the terms of the Arnamagnæan Foundation, established in 1760. The Arnamagnæan Manuscript Collection, which comprises some 3000 items, is now divided between Copenhagen and Reykjavík. Since 2009 it has been inscribed on UNESCO’s Memory of the World International Register. The institute's academic staff are responsible for research and instruction in the areas of Old West Norse (Old Icelandic), Old Danish and Old Swedish, as well as Modern Icelandic and Faroese language and literature. Attached to the institute there is a photographic studio and a conservation workshop, the former with one and the latter two full-time members of staff. The institute publishes a series of scholarly monographs under the title Bibliotheca Arnamagnæana and a series of critical editions of Old Norse/Icelandic texts under the title Editiones Arnamagnæanæ as well as a scholarly journal titled Opuscula. The institute also organises, together with Árni Magnússon Institute for Icelandic Studies, an annual summer school in manuscript studies, held alternately in Copenhagen and Reykjavík, and an international seminar on the Care and Conservation of Manuscripts, held in Copenhagen every other year.
