= Agnesar saga =

Agnesar saga is an Old Norse-Icelandic saints' saga that recounts the legend of St Agnes of Rome. It survives in three versions, all based on Pseudo-Ambrose's passion, BHL156. Agnesar saga I omits the epilogue and is somewhat abridged. It follows the source text more closely than Agnesar saga II. Agnesar saga III is significantly abridged and is different from the first two versions.

== Background ==
Agnes's feast day of 21 January was adopted as Holy Day of Obligation in Iceland in 1179 under Þorlákr Þórhallsson. This was prompted by a vision of St Agnes which appeared to Guðmundr kárhöfði.

There was an image of St Agnes at the Kirkjubær convent dating to the second half of the fourteenth century. The nun Jórunn Hauksdóttir of Kirkjubær took the name Agnes in 1344 when she became abbess. Agnesar saga I is preserved in Kirkjubæjarbók (AM 429 12mo), a codex containing lives of female saints kept at the convent.

Agnes also appears in three medieval and early modern Icelandic poems and in a set of four rímur: Agnesardiktur (ca. 1300-1550); Rímur af Agnesi píslarvotti, composed by Eiríkur Hallsson (1614-1698); Agnesarkvæði (ca. 1725), attributed to Þorvaldur Magnússon; Heilagra meyja drápa, stanzas 30-32 (14th century).

== Bibliography ==
A comprehensive bibliography can be found in Wolf's The Legends of the Saints in Old Norse-Icelandic Prose.

=== Agnesar saga I ===
==== Manuscripts ====
- AM 235 fol. - ca. 1400
- AM 238 fol. I - ca. 1300
- AM 238 fol. II - ca. 1300-1350
- AM 429 12mo (Kirkjubæjarbók) - ca. 1500

==== Editions ====
- Foote, Peter (1962). Lives of Saints: Perg. fol. nr. 2 in the Royal Library, Stockholm. Early Icelandic Manuscripts in Facsimile 4. Copenhagen: Rosenkilde and Bagger.
- Unger, Carl Richard (1877). Heilagra manna søgur. Vol. 1. Christiania. pp. 15–22.
- Wolf, Kirsten (1997). The Icelandic Legend of Saint Dorothy. Studies and Texts 130. Toronto: Pontifical Institute of Mediaeval Studies. pp. 89–103.
- Wolf, Kirsten (2011). A Female Legendary from Iceland: "Kirkjubæjarbók" (AM 429 12mo) in The Arnamagnæan Collection, Copenhagen. Manuscripta Nordica: Early Nordic Manuscripts in Digital Facsimile 3. Copenhagen: Museum Tusculanum Press. pp. 122–129.
- Wolf, Kirsten (2003). Heilagra meyja sögu. Íslensk trúarrit 1. Reykjavík: Bókmenntafræðistofnun Háskola Íslands. pp. 3–10. [Modern Icelandic edition]

=== Agnesar saga II ===
==== Manuscript ====
- AM 233a fol. - ca. 1350-1375

==== Edition ====
- Unger, Carl Richard (1877). Heilagra manna søgur. Vol. 1. Christiania. p. 22.

=== Agnesar saga III ===
==== Manuscript ====
- AM 238 fol. - ca. 1450-1500

==== Edition ====
- Wolf, Kirsten (2011). A Female Legendary from Iceland: "Kirkjubæjarbók" (AM 429 12mo) in The Arnamagnæan Collection, Copenhagen. Manuscripta Nordica: Early Nordic Manuscripts in Digital Facsimile 3. Copenhagen: Museum Tusculanum Press. p. 42.
