= Saints' sagas =

Genre of Old Norse saga

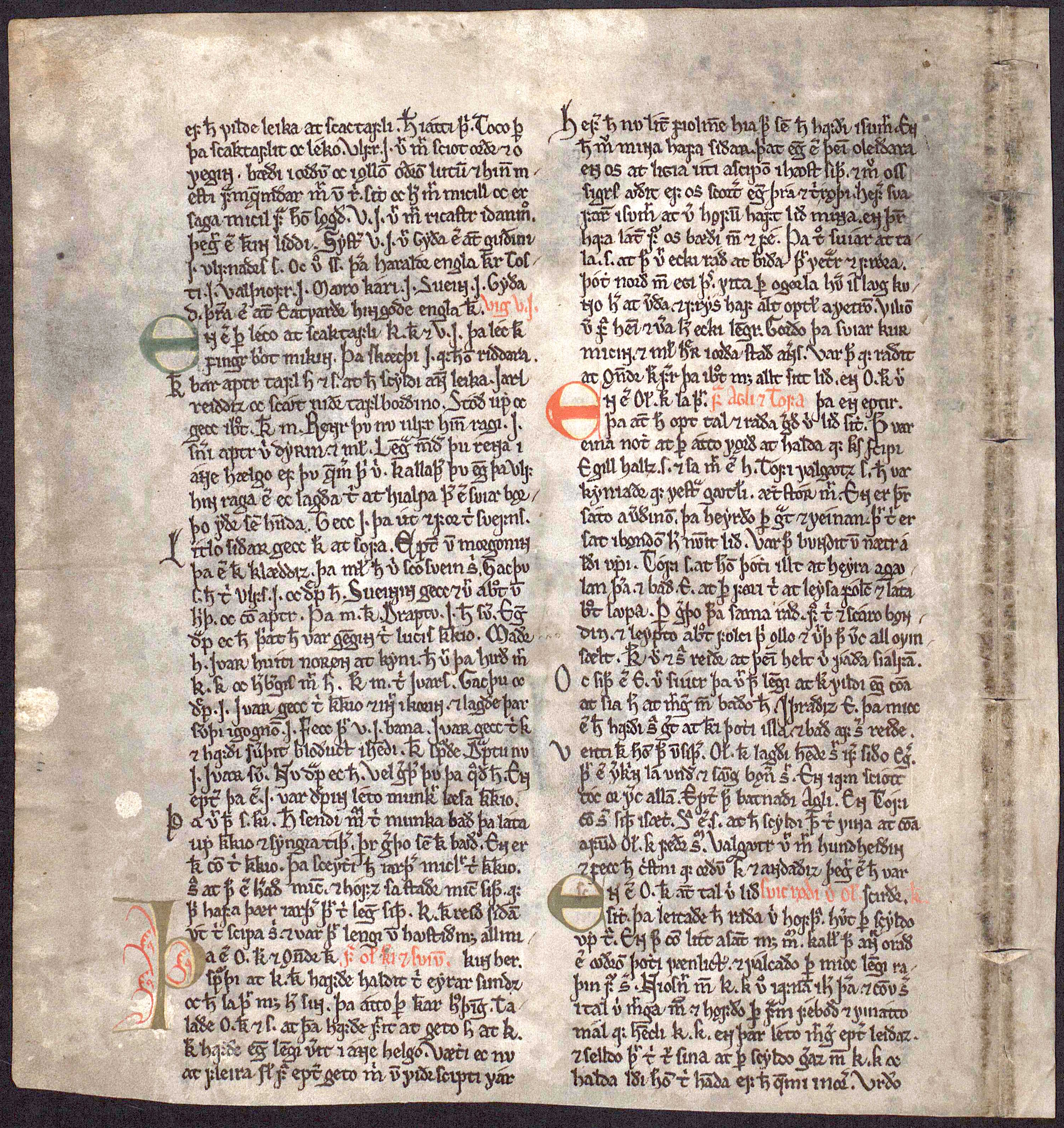
Text from Óláfs saga helga [the saga of King Ólafur the Saint], the longest of Heimskringla's 16 sagas about the kings of Scandinavia.

Saints' sagas (Old Norse heilagra manna sögur) are a genre of Old Norse sagas comprising the prose hagiography of medieval western Scandinavia.

The corpus of such sagas and their manuscript attestations was surveyed by Ole Widding, Hans Bekker-Nielsen, L. K. Shook in 1963. Their work revealed over 100 different saints' lives, mostly based on Latin sources. Few are of Icelandic saints, with only Jón Ögmundarson (d. 1121), Þorlákr Þórhallsson (d. 1193), and Guðmundr Arason (d. 1237) being candidates.

In the words of Jonas Wellendorf:

While the sagas of the Icelanders might be the unique contribution to world literature that clearly demarcates Old Norse-Icelandic literature from other literary traditions in the Middle Ages, and indeed other periods as well, the lives of saints connect the very same literature with the rest of Western Europe.

These sagas are preserved in many medieval manuscripts. Two notable collections are Kirkjubæjarbók, which is exclusively concerned with female saints, and Codex Scardensis which gathers together lives of the apostles.

== List of Sagas ==
The following list of sagas is taken from Wolf's The legends of the saints in Old Norse-Icelandic prose. The corresponding saints are listed in parentheses after the saga titles. Material relating to saints which is incorporated into other sagas is listed separately, below.

- Agǫtu saga (Agatha)
- Agnesar saga (Agnes)
- Alexíss saga (Alexius)
- Ambrósíuss saga biskups (Ambrose)
- Amícus saga ok Amilíus (Amicus and Amelius)
- Andréss saga postola (Andrew the Apostle)
- Önnu saga (Anne)
- Antóníuss saga (Anthony)
- Ágústínuss saga (Augustine)
- Barbǫru saga (Barbara)
- Barlaams saga ok Jósafats (Barlaam and Josaphat)
- Barthólómeuss saga postol (Barthlomew)
- Basilíuss saga (Basil)
- Af Beda presti (Bede)
- Benedikts saga (Benedict)
- Blasíuss saga (Blase)
- Af Bónifacío (Boniface IV)
- Af frú Aglais (Boniface of Tarsus)
- Brandanuss saga (Brendan)
- Katrínar saga (Catherine of Alexandria)
- Cecilíu saga (Cecilia)
- Kristófórs saga (Christopher)
- Klements saga (Clement I)
- Kross saga (The Holy Cross)
- Af Cuthberto (Cuthbert)
- Exemplum af Sankti Sipríano þeim góða mann (Cyprian and Justina)
- Díónysíuss saga (Dionysius)
- Dóminíkuss saga (Dominic)
- Dórótheu saga (Dorothy)
- Dúnstanuss saga (Dunstan)
- Játvarðar saga (Edward the Confessor)
- Elisabetar leiðsla (Elisabeth of Schönau)
- Erasmuss saga (Erasmus)
- Plácíduss saga (Eustace)
- Fídesar saga, Spesar ok Karítasar (Fides, Spes, and Caritas)
- XL riddara saga (40 Armenian Martyrs)
- Af Sindulfo ok hans frú (Gangulphus)
- Georgíuss saga (George)
- Egidíuss saga (Giles)
- Gregors saga páfa (Gregory the Great)
- Gregors saga biskups (Gregory on the stone)
- Guðmundar saga (Guðmundur Arason)
- Hallvarðs saga (Hallvard)
- Hendriks saga og Kúnigúndísar (Henry and Cunegund)
- Jakobs saga postola (ins eldra) (James, son of Zebedee)
- Jakobs saga postola (ins yngra) (James the Less)
- Jerónímuss saga (Jerome)
- Jóns saga baptista (John the Baptist)
- Jóns saga gullmunns (John Chrysostom)
- Jóns saga postola (John the Evangelist)
- Tveggja postola saga Jóns ok Jakobs ens eldra (John the Evangelist and James, son of Zebedee)
- Jóns saga helga (Jón of Hólar)
- Af Lanfranco (Lanfranc of Canterbury)
- Lárentíuss saga erkidjákns (Laurence)
- Lazaruss saga (Lazarus)
- Lúcíu saga (Lucy of Syracuse)
- Magnúss saga Eyjajarls (Magnus of Orkney)
- Malkuss saga (Malchus)
- Af Marcellíno páfa (Marcellinus)
- Margrétar saga (Margaret of Antioch)
- Af Marínu munk (Marina)
- Mark
- Mǫrtu saga ok Maríu Magðalenu (Martha and Mary Magdalen)
- Marteins saga biskups (Martin of Tours)
- Maríu saga (Mary, mother of Jesus)
- Maríu saga egipzku (Mary of Egypt)
- Af Maríu de Oegines (Mary of Oignies)
- Matheuss saga postola (Matthew)
- Máritíuss saga (Maurice)
- Máruss saga (Maurus)
- Mikjáls saga (Michael the archangel)
- Nikuláss saga erkibiskups (Nicholas)
- Nikuláss saga af Tólentínó (Nicholas of Talentino)
- Niðrstigningar saga (Gospel of Nichodemus)
- Óláfs saga helga (Ólfafr Haraldsson)
- Osvalds saga (Oswald)
- Páls saga postola (Paul the Apostle)
- Páls saga eremita (Paul the hermit)
- Pétrs saga postola (Peter)
- Tveggja postola saga Pétrs ok Páls (Peter and Paul)
- Af Celestíno ok Bonifacío páfum (Peter Celestine)
- Filippuss saga postola (Philip)
- Remigíuss saga (Remigius)
- Rokluss saga (Roch)
- Sebastíanuss saga (Sebastian)
- Servasíuss saga (Servatius)
- Sjau sofanda saga (Seven Sleepers)
- Silvesters saga (Silvester)
- Tveggja postola saga Símons ok Júdass (Simon and Judas)
- Stefáns saga (Stephen)
- Seljumanna þáttr (Sunniva and Companions)
- Theódórs saga (Theodore Tyro)
- Thómass saga postola (Thomas the Apostle)
- Thómass saga erkibiskups (Thomas Beckett)
- Heilagra þriggja konunga saga (Three Kings)
- Þorláks saga biskups (Þorlákr Þórhallsson)
- Af Úrsúlu (Ursula)
- Vincentíuss saga (Vincent)
- Heilagra feðra œfi (Vitae Patrum)
- Vítuss saga (Vitus)
- Valbjargar jartegnir (Walburga)

=== Saints' lives incorporated into other texts ===
==== Maríu saga ====
- Af Anselmo (Anslem of Canterbury)
- Af Bernardo (Bernard of Clairvaux)
- Af Bonito (Bonitus)
- Af Eadmundo (Edmund Rich)
- Af Eusebío (Eusebius of Vercelli)
- Af Francisco (Francis of Assisi)
- Af Fulberto (Fulbert of Chartres)
- Af Heremanno (Herman the cripple)
- Af Hugo (Hugh of Bonnevaux)
- Af Húgo ábóta (Hugh of Cluny)
- Af Hildifonso (Ildephonsus)
- Af Jóhanne elemosinario (John the Almoner)
- Af Jóhanne Damasceno (John Damascene)
- Af Leó páfa (Leo the Great)
- Um Maternus (Maternus)
- Af Ódílo ábóta Odilo of Cluny
- Af Pétro Clarevallensis (Peter Monoculus)

==== Other texts ====
- Gereon (a passion of this saint is included in Máritíuss saga)
- Gregory Thaumaturgus (incorporated into the Old Norwegian version of Barlaams saga ok Jósafats as Af Gregor Thaumarturgus)
- Hippolytus (A legend of this saint is incorporated into Lárentíuss saga erkidjákns)
- Leonard of Noblac a short legend of this saint is included in a prayer to Saint Margaret of Antioch)
- Pantaleon (two fragments dated to 1200–1300) may represent a legend of this saint) (Wolf 310–302)
- Pelagia (incorporated into the Old Norwegian version of Barlaams saga ok Jósafats as Af Pelagíu)
- Salinus (the passion and miracles of this saint are included in Karlamagnúss saga)
- Sixtus II (incorporated into Lárentíuss saga erkidjákns)
- Stephen of Grandmont (incorporated in Maríu saga as Af Stephano)
- Thais (incorporated into the Old Norwegian version of Barlaams saga ok Jósafats as Af Thais)
- A passion of Tiburtius and Valerian is included in Cecilíu saga
- There are Old Norwegian and Old Icelandic translations of Gregory the Great's Dialogues (Díalógar (Viðrœður) Gregors páfa)

Wolf's list notes that the Old Norse-Icelandic tales of Charlemagne, Canute of Denmark and Canute Lavard are secular works and therefore cannot be considered as saints' lives.

== Editions ==
- Unger, C. R. (1877). Heilagra manna søgur: fortællinger og legender om hellige mænd og kvinder. Vol. 2 volumes. Christiania. (Link is to Vol. 1. Vol. 2 here.)
- Unger, C. R. (1877). Heilagra manna sögur: fortællinger og legender om hellige mænd og kvinder. Christiania. (Link to the text version on Heimskringla.no)
- Unger, C. R. (1871). Mariu saga: Legender om jomfru Maria og hendes jertegn. Vol. 2 volumes. Christiania: Brögger & Christie. (Link is to Vol. 1. Vol. 2 here.)
- Unger, C. R. (1874). Postola sögur: legendariske fortællinger om apostlernes liv, deres kamp for kristendommens udbredelse samt deres martyrdød. Christiania.
- Unger, C. R. (1869). Thomas Saga Erkibyskups. Christiania.
