= Cecilíu saga =

Cecilíu saga is an Old Norse-Icelandic saints' saga that recounts the legend of St Cecilia. It is preserved in three manuscripts, but is only complete in Kirkjubæjarbók. The version of the saga preserved in Stock. Perg. fol no. 2 includes two Icelandic miracles of St Cecilia. These are notable for being one of the very few examples of miracles performed by non-native saints, and as an example of early hagiographic composition in Iceland rather than translations from Latin exemplars. Cormack notes that while these miracles may be late compositions, "they give the impression of being genuine records of an early cultus".

Cecilia's feast day November 22 was adopted as Holy Day of Obligation in Iceland in 1179 under Þorlákr Þórhallsson.

The saga also includes an account of the passions of Sts Tiburtius and Valerian.

Cecilia appears in three Old Norse-Icelandic poems: Vísur Cecilíu (ca. 1300-1500); Cecilíudiktur (ca. 1400-1550); and the fourteenth-century Heilagra meyja drápa (stanzas 18-21).

== Bibliography ==
A comprehensive bibliography can be found in Wolf's The Legends of the Saints in Old Norse-Icelandic Prose.

=== Manuscripts ===
- AM 235 fol.
- AM 429 12mo (Kirkjubæjarbók)
- Stock. Perg. fol no. 2

=== Editions ===
- Foote, Peter (1962). Lives of Saints: Perg. fol. nr. 2 in the Royal Library, Stockholm. Early Icelandic Manuscripts in Facsimile 4. Copenhagen: Rosenkilde and Bagger.
- Unger, Carl Richard (1877). Heilagra manna søgur. Vol. 1. Christiania. pp. 276–297.
- Wolf, Kirsten (2011). A Female Legendary from Iceland: "Kirkjubæjarbók" (AM 429 12mo) in The Arnamagnæan Collection, Copenhagen. Manuscripta Nordica: Early Nordic Manuscripts in Digital Facsimile 3. Copenhagen: Museum Tusculanum Press. pp. 92–108.
- Wolf, Kirsten (2003). Heilagra meyja sögu. Íslensk trúarrit 1. Reykjavík: Bókmenntafræðistofnun Háskola Íslands. pp. 101–122. [Modern Icelandic edition]
