= Katrínar saga =

Old Norse-Icelandic saints' saga

Katrínar saga is an Old Norse-Icelandic saints' saga that tells the story of St Catherine of Alexandria. It survives in four manuscripts from the 14th to 15th centuries, but is only extant in full in Stock. Perg. fol. 2.

Cormack notes that the cult of Catherine came to Iceland relatively late, was not firmly established until the thirteenth century, and was most popular in south-west Iceland.

A text called Katrinar Saga is preserved in the manuscript AM 180b fol. This however, is not the legend of St Catherine but instead a translation of Sanctae Catharinae Virginis et Martyris Translatio et Miracula Rotomagensia which is an account of the translation of Catherine's relics and the associated miracles in eleventh century Rouen.

Catherine also appears in two fourteenth century Old Norse-Icelandic poems: Kátrínardrápa by Kálfr Hallson and Heilagra meyja drápa (stanzas 22-24).

== Bibliography ==
A comprehensive bibliography can be found in Wolf's The Legends of the Saints in Old Norse-Icelandic Prose.

=== Manuscripts ===
- AM 233a fol.
- AM 238 fol. II
- AM 667 4to II
- AM 429 12mo (Kirkjubæjarbók)
- Stock. Perg. fol no. 2

=== Editions ===
- Foote, Peter (1962). Lives of Saints: Perg. fol. nr. 2 in the Royal Library, Stockholm. Early Icelandic Manuscripts in Facsimile 4. Copenhagen: Rosenkilde and Bagger.
- Unger, Carl Richard (1877). Heilagra manna søgur. Vol. 1. Christiania. pp. 400-421.
- Wolf, Kirsten (2011). A Female Legendary from Iceland: "Kirkjubæjarbók" (AM 429 12mo) in The Arnamagnæan Collection, Copenhagen. Manuscripta Nordica: Early Nordic Manuscripts in Digital Facsimile 3. Copenhagen: Museum Tusculanum Press. pp. 79–91.
- Wolf, Kirsten (2003). Heilagra meyja sögu. Íslensk trúarrit 1. Reykjavík: Bókmenntafræðistofnun Háskola Íslands. pp. 123–141. [Modern Icelandic edition]
