= AM 227 fol. =

14th-century illuminated manuscript

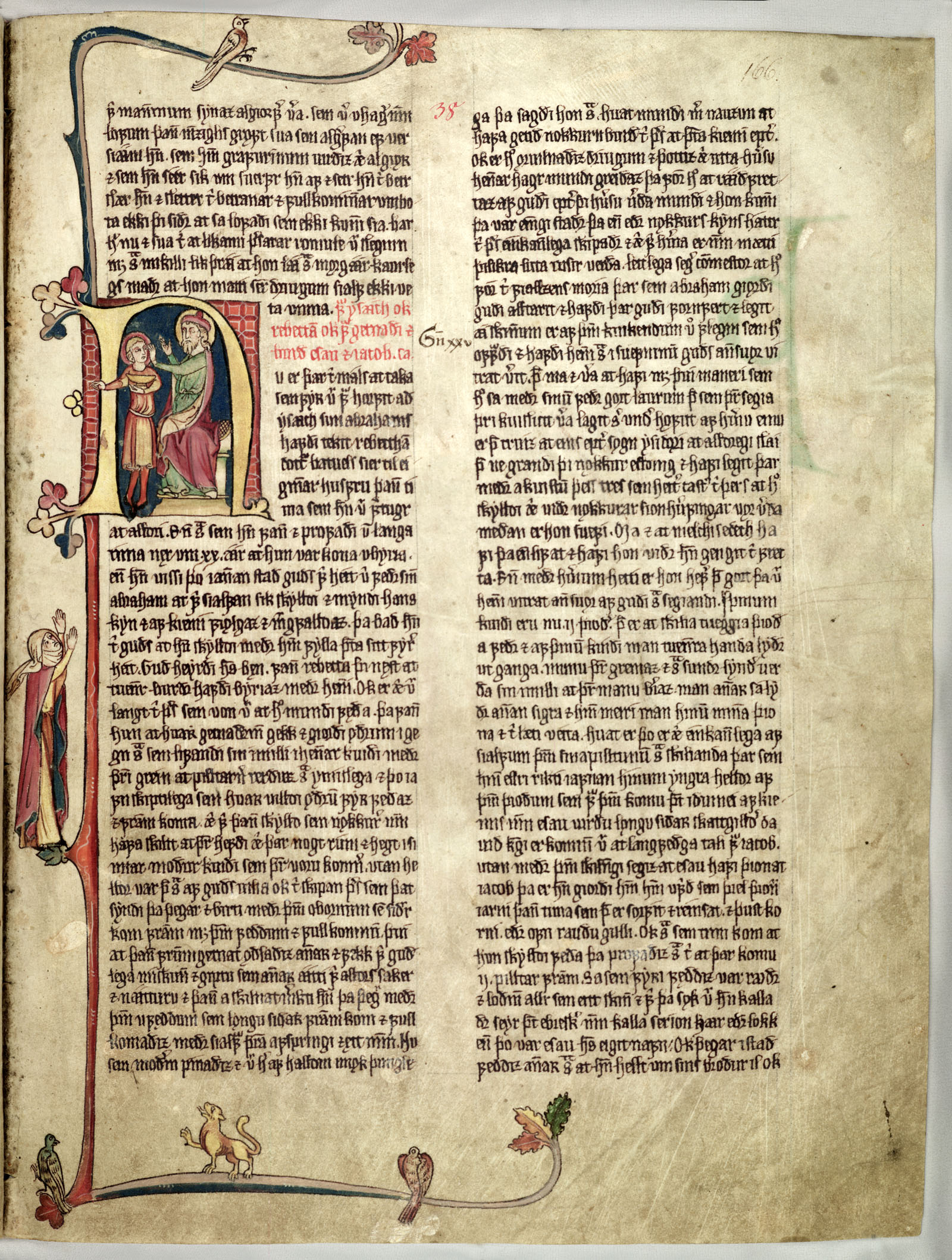
An illuminated page from Stjórn I in AM 227 fol. The red text and illuminated letter mark the beginning of Genesis 25:20.

AM 227 fol. is a fourteenth century Icelandic illuminated manuscript. It contains a version of Stjórn, an Old Norse biblical compilation, and is one of three independent witnesses to this work. It is lavishly illustrated and is one of the most impressive manuscripts collected by Árni Magnússon.

== Description and history ==
The codex now measures 35 cm × 27 cm (14 in × 11 in) but was originally larger, having been trimmed, probably during the late seventeenth century when it was bound. In its current form, the manuscript has 128 leaves, but may originally have comprised 150. Five leaves of the manuscript were obtained by Árni Magnússon after he collected the codex itself. Árni Magnússon received the codex from Bishop Jón Víldalín in 1699; it had previously belonged to Skálholt Cathedral. AM 227 fol. was at Skálholt in 1588 and is likely to be the 'Bible in Icelandic' mentioned in an inventory of 1548.

The Stjórn exists in three parts. Only AM 226 fol. contains all three; it originally contained just parts I and III, but part II was added in the fifteenth century. AM 227 fol. contains Stjórn I and III. However, the last leaf of gathering 10 and the first of gathering 11 were left blank. This gap may have been left for Stjórn II.

== Scribes and illuminator ==
The manuscript was written by two scribes, known as A and B. These scribes also produced another Stjórn text, AM 229 fol. They also appear together in AM 657 a-b (which includes Klári saga). Hand B is also represented in the Stjórn fragment NRA 60A and copied part of Rómverja saga in AM 595 a-b 4to. Hand A is best known from Codex Wormianus (AM 242 fol.) but also worked on AM 127 4to (Jónsbók), GKS 3269 a 4to (Jónsbók), AM 162 a fol β (Egils saga), AM 240 fol IV (Maríu saga), AM 667 4to IX (Jóns saga baptista), NRA 62 (Karlamagnús saga) and AM 554 40 fols. 20r-21r (Völuspá in Hauksbók).

The manuscript was illuminated by the main illustrator from Þingeyrar, who was also responsible for the earliest part of Teiknibók. The iconographic imagery of the Þingeyrar manuscripts Teiknibók, AM 227 fol. and AM 249 e fol. shows influence from fourteenth century East Anglian manuscript illustration.
