= Margrétar saga =

Old Norse-Icelandic saints' saga

Margrétar saga is an Old Norse-Icelandic saints' saga that tells the story of St Margaret of Antioch. There are three versions of the saga based on at least two translations, and it is extant in more medieval and post-reformation copies than any other saint's legend. Its popularity appears in part to be due to the text's use in childbirth contexts, which was a uniquely Icelandic development of a popular European tradition. The date of the legend's first translation into Old-Norse Icelandic is unknown, but based on the dating of its earliest manuscripts it is taken to have occurred some time before 1300.

There is no date or location for the origin for the veneration of Margaret in Iceland. However, Cormack notes that the first Icelander named Margrét is recorded in Landnámabók as dying in 1216, and that images of Margaret in the diocese of Hólar pre-date the dedications to Margaret in Skálholt.

== Bibliography ==
A comprehensive bibliography can be found in Wolf's The Legends of the Saints in Old Norse-Icelandic Prose.

=== Editions ===
==== Margrétar saga I ====
- Haugen, Odd Einar (1994) “Margrétar saga”, in Norrøne tekster i utval, ed. Odd Einar Haugen, Oslo: Ad Notam Gyldendal, pp. 266–77
- Rasmussen, Peter (1977) “Tekstforholdene i Margrétar saga”, 3 vols. Specialeafhandling til magisterkonferens i nordisk filologi, University of Copenhagen, vol. 3, pp. 1–10
- Unger, C.R. (1877) Heilagra manna søgur, vol. 1, pp. 474–81
- Wolf, Kirsten (2003) Heilagra meyja sögur, pp. 42–9 [Modern Icelandic Edition]

==== Margrétar saga II ====
- Rasmussen, Peter (1977) “Tekstforholdene i Margrétar saga”, 3 vols. Specialeafhandling til magisterkonferens i nordisk filologi, University of Copenhagen, vol. 3, pp. 19–27
- Wolf, Kirsten (2011) A Female Legendary from Iceland, pp. 67–78
- Wolf, Kirsten (2010) "Margrétar saga II", Gripla, 21, pp. 61–104

==== Margrétar saga III ====
- Rasmussen, Peter (1977) “Tekstforholdene i Margrétar saga”, 3 vols. Specialeafhandling til magisterkonferens i nordisk filologi, University of Copenhagen, vol. 3, pp. 29–48

== See also ==
- Kirkjubæjarbók
