= Codex Wormianus =

14th-century Icelandic vellum codex

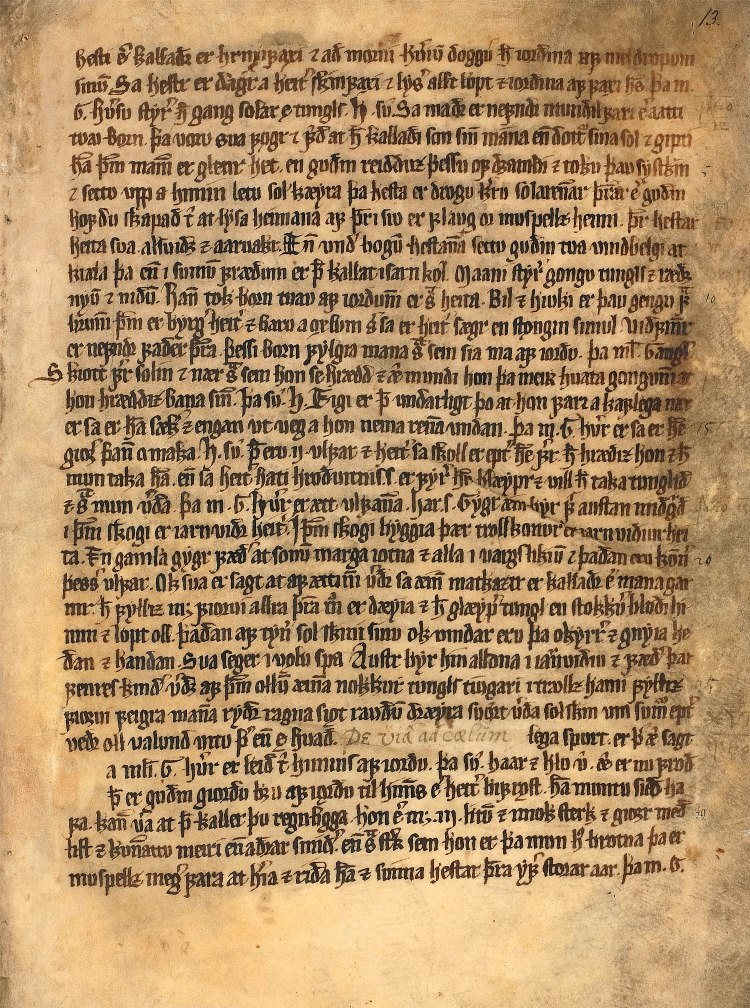
Codex Wormianus AM 242 fol.

The Codex Wormianus or AM 242 fol. is an Icelandic vellum codex dating from the mid-14th century. It contains an edition of the Prose Edda and some additional material on poetics, including the First Grammatical Treatise. It is the only manuscript to preserve the Rígsþula.

The manuscript is believed to have been written in the Benedictine monastery Þingeyraklaustur in Þingeyrar in northern Iceland around 1350. It was obtained by the runologist Ole Worm from the Icelandic scholar Arngrímur Jónsson in 1628, according to an inscription on the first page of the work. In 1706, Árni Magnússon obtained the document from Ole Worm's nephew, Christian Worm. Today it remains part of the Arnamagnæan Manuscript Collection at the Arnamagnæan Institute in Copenhagen, Denmark.

The scribe who wrote Codex Wormianus worked on a number of manuscripts, including the Stjórn codex AM 227 fol.
