= Teiknibók =

Icelandic manuscript

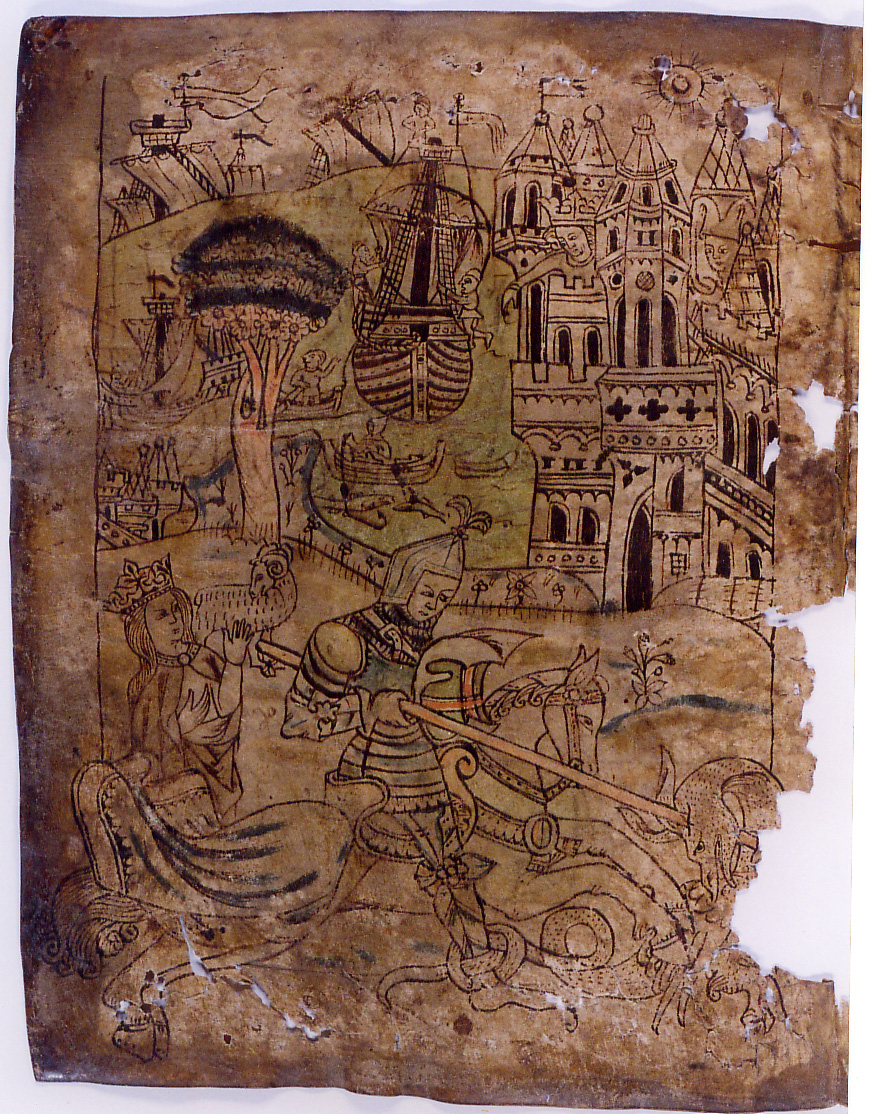
A page from Teiknibók showing St George slaying the dragon.

Teiknibók (Reykjavík, Stofnun Árna Magnússonar, AM 673 a III 4to) is an Icelandic manuscript of drawings used as models for manuscript illumination, painting, carving and metalwork. It is remarkable for being one of only three dozen books of its type which survive from Western Europe and the only example extant from medieval Scandinavia. The manuscript was produced over a period of over 150 years by four anonymous artists, beginning in around 1330. The illustrations in Teiknibók resemble those in Kirkjubæjarbók, and it may have served as a model for them. In the words of the manuscript's most recent editor Guðbjörg Kristjánsdóttir, "The diverse subjects of the drawings prove that Icelandic art flourished to a far greater degree than surviving works of art would indicate."

== History and description ==
The manuscript was given to Árni Magnússon along with two leaves from the Icelandic Physiologus dating to around 1200. The Árni Magnússon Institute in Iceland received the manuscript on 2 June 1991, which is in too poor a condition to be displayed permanently.

21 leaves and a fragment of the manuscript survive. The leaves measure between 170 and 180 mm by 127–135 mm. The condition of the manuscript is poor, affected by patches of rot and decay which has left holes in its pages. The illustrations themselves are faded and worn, and a number have been altered and others have been scribbled over.

Four artists worked on the manuscript: Artist A (1330–1360) illustrated 15 sheets; Artist B (1360–1390) worked on 2 pages; Artist C (1450–1475) has left work on 22 pages; Artist D (c. 1500) is found on 8 pages.

Battista suggests that the monastery at Þingeyrar is a likely source for the manuscript. Artist A also illuminated other Þingeyrar manuscripts including AM 227 fol. (Stjórn). The iconographic imagery of Teiknibók and the Þingeyrar manuscripts AM 227 fol. and AM 249 e fol. shows influence from fourteenth century East Anglian manuscript illustration.
