= Salvus =

Salvus is a Latin adjective meaning "safe". It may refer to:

- Siebe Gorman Salvus, a British industrial rescue and shallow water oxygen rebreather
- Salvus Water, a spa in Bükkszék, Hungary

== See also ==
- Salvius (disambiguation), an open source humanoid robot
