= Dórótheu saga =

Dórótheu saga is an Old Norse-Icelandic saints' saga that recounts the legend of St Dorothy of Caesarea. It is preserved only in the manuscript Kirkjubæjarbók (AM 429 12mo), a codex containing lives of female saints written in Iceland around 1500. This manuscript also contains the only Old Norse-Icelandic poetry written about St Dorothy before 1500 and a Latin prayer to the saint not known from elsewhere in medieval Scandinavia.

The text of the saga is a very close translation of the Latin text BHL 2324, with occasional differences, some of which are found in BHL 2325d.

Dorothy also appears in three medieval and early modern Icelandic poems: Dórótheudiktur (ca. 1400–1500), which follows Dórótheu saga in Kirkjubæjarbók; Dórótheukvæði I, attributed to Ólafur Jónsson (1560-1672); Dórótheukvæði II (17th century), a rendering of the Danish ballad Den hellige Dorothea.

== Bibliography ==
A comprehensive bibliography can be found in Wolf's The Legends of the Saints in Old Norse-Icelandic Prose.

=== Manuscripts ===
- AM 429 12mo (Kirkjubæjarbók)

=== Editions ===
- Unger, Carl Richard (1877). Heilagra manna søgur. Vol. 1. Christiania. pp. 322-328.
- Wolf, Kirsten (1997). The Icelandic Legend of Saint Dorothy. Studies and Texts 130. Toronto: Pontifical Institute of Mediaeval Studies. pp. 89-103.
- Wolf, Kirsten (2011). A Female Legendary from Iceland: "Kirkjubæjarbók" (AM 429 12mo) in The Arnamagnæan Collection, Copenhagen. Manuscripta Nordica: Early Nordic Manuscripts in Digital Facsimile 3. Copenhagen: Museum Tusculanum Press. pp. 111–119.
- Wolf, Kirsten (2003). Heilagra meyja sögu. Íslensk trúarrit 1. Reykjavík: Bókmenntafræðistofnun Háskola Íslands. pp. 18–24. [Modern Icelandic edition]

=== Further reading ===
- Wolf, Kirsten (1996). "The Legend of Saint Dorothy: Medieval Vernacular Renderings and their Latin Sources". Analecta Bollandiana. 114 (1–2): 41–72. doi:10.1484/J.ABOL.4.01677. ISSN 0003-2468.
