= Gautama Buddha in world religions =

Veneration of the founder of Buddhism in other religions

Gautama Buddha, the founder of Buddhism, is also venerated as a manifestation of God in Hinduism and the Baháʼí Faith. Some Hindu texts regard Buddha as an avatar of the god Vishnu, who came to Earth to delude beings away from the Vedic religion. Some Non-denominational and Quranist Muslims believe he was a prophet. He is also regarded as a prophet by the Ahmadiyyah.

== Baháʼí Faith ==
In the Baháʼí Faith, Buddha is classified as one of the Manifestations of God which is a title for a major prophet in the Baháʼí Faith. Similarly, the Prophet of the Baháʼí Faith, Bahá'u'lláh, is believed by Baháʼís to be the Fifth Buddha, among other prophetic stations.

== Christianity ==
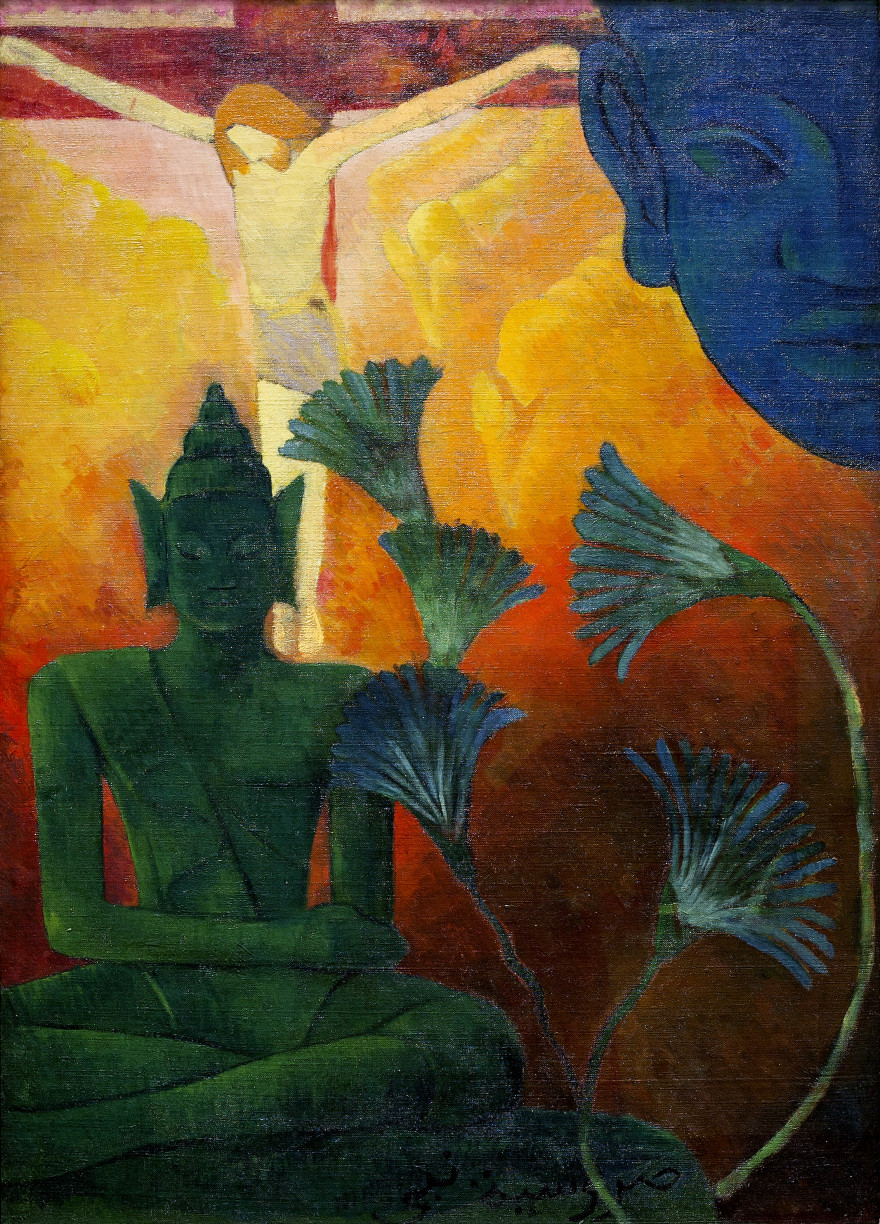
Christ and Buddha by Paul Ranson, 1880

The Greek legend of "Barlaam and Ioasaph", sometimes mistakenly attributed to the 7th century St. John of Damascus but actually written by the Georgian monk Euthymius in the 11th century, was ultimately derived, through a variety of intermediate versions (Arabic and Georgian) from the life story of the Buddha. The king-turned-monk Ioasaph (Georgian Iodasaph, Arabic Yūdhasaf or Būdhasaf: Arabic "b" could become "y" by duplication of a dot in handwriting) ultimately derives his name from the Sanskrit Bodhisattva, the name used in Buddhist accounts for Gautama before he became a Buddha. Barlaam and Ioasaph were placed in the Greek Orthodox calendar of saints on 26 August, and in the West they were entered as "Barlaam and Josaphat" in the Roman Martyrology on the date of 27 November.

== Hinduism ==
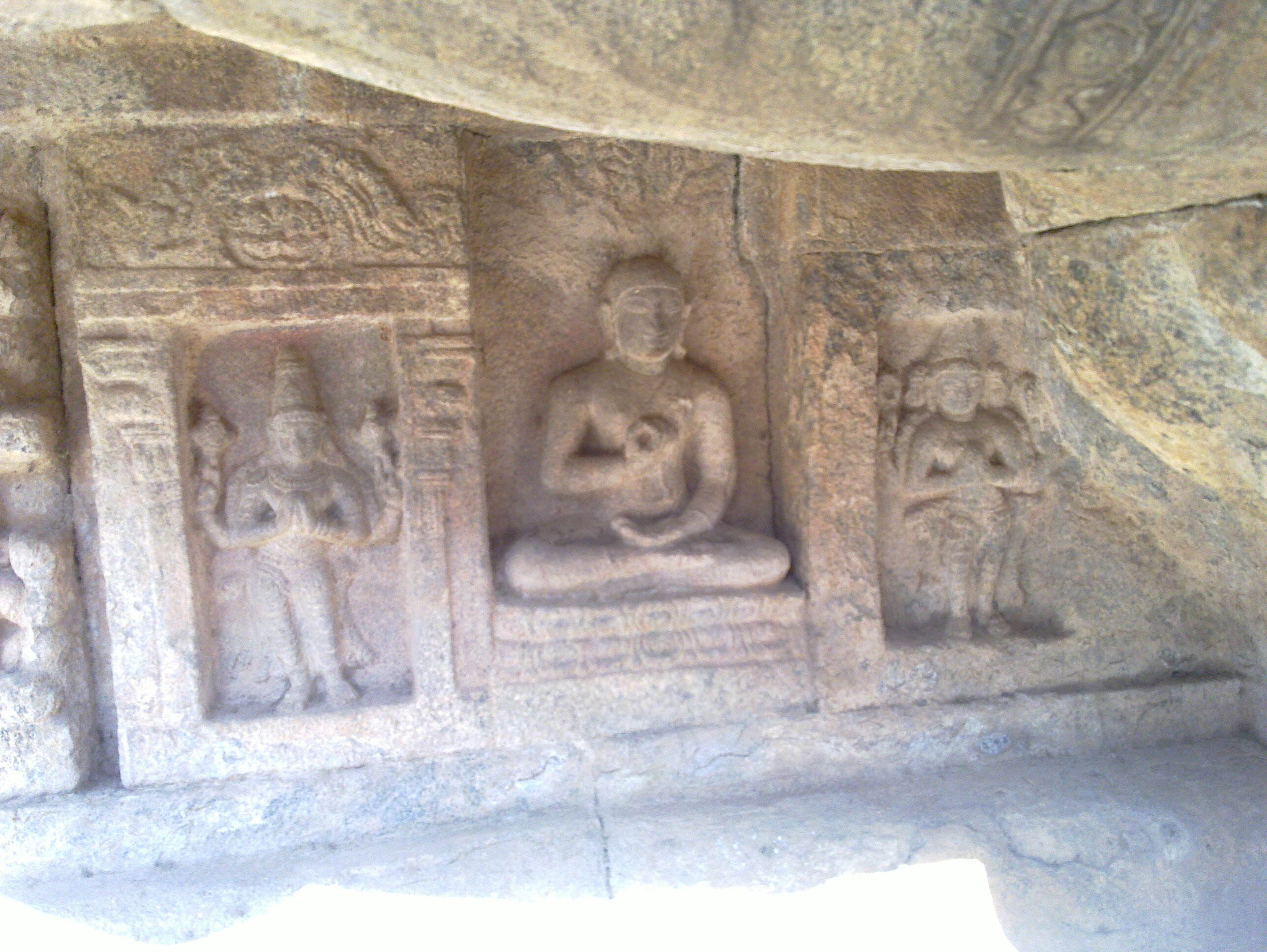
Buddha as an avatara of Vishnu at 12th Century UNESCO World Heritage site of Airavatesvara Temple

Gautama Buddha is mentioned as an Avatar of Vishnu in the Puranic texts of Hinduism. In the Bhagavata Purana he is twenty fourth of twenty five avatars, prefiguring a forthcoming final incarnation. A number of Hindu traditions portray Buddha as the most recent of ten principal avatars, known as the Dashavatara (Ten Incarnations of God).

Siddhartha Gautama's teachings deny the authority of the Vedas and consequently [at least atheistic] Buddhism is generally viewed as a nāstika school (heterodox, literally "It is not so") from the perspective of orthodox Hinduism.

== Islam ==
The Islamic prophet Dhu al-Kifl (Arabic: ذو الكفل) has been identified by some with Gautama Buddha. The meaning of Dhu al-Kifl is still debated, but, according to this theory, it means "the man from Kifl", Kifl being the Arabic rendering of Kapilavastu, the city where the Buddha spent thirty years of his life. Another argument used by supporters of this theory is that Buddha was from Kapeel, which was the capital of a small state situated on the border of India and Nepal. According to this claim, Buddha was many a time referred to as being "of Kapeel", literally translating to Arabic as Dhu al-Kifl. The consonant /p/ is not present in Arabic, with the nearest (and philologically related) phoneme being /f/, represented by the letter ف.

The supporters of this theory cite the first verses of the 95th chapter of the Qur'an, Surah At-Tin:

By the fig and the olive, and Mount Sinai, and this secure city of Mecca!

— Qur'an, 95:1-3

It is mentioned in Buddhist sources that Buddha attained enlightenment under the fig tree. So, according to the theory, from the places mentioned in these verses: Sinai is the place where Moses received revelation; Mecca is the place where Muhammad received revelation; and the olive tree is the place where Jesus received revelation. In this case, the remaining fig tree is where Buddha received revelation. It is also possible the fig tree symbolizes the first prophet, Adam.

Some also take it a bit further and state that Muhammad himself was a Buddha, as Buddha means "enlightened one".

=== Ahmadiyya ===
Mirza Tahir Ahmad, the fourth Caliph of the Ahmadiyya Community, in his book Revelation, Rationality, Knowledge & Truth, argues that Buddha was indeed a prophet of God who preached monotheism. He quotes from the inscriptions on Ashoka's stupas which mention "Is'ana" which means God. He quotes, "'Thus spake Devanampiya Piyadasi: "Wherefore from this very hour, I have caused religious discourses to be preached, I have appointed religious observances that mankind, having listened thereto, shall be brought to follow in the right path, and give glory to God* (Is'ana)." Ahmad also stated that Dhu al-Kifl may have been the Buddha in his book An Elementary Study of Islam.

== Judaism ==
The story of Barlaam and Josaphat was translated into Hebrew in the 13th century by Abraham Ibn Chisdai (or Hasdai) as "ben-haMelekh v'haNazir" ("The Prince and the Nazirite"). A version of Buddha's life was also adapted into a 17th century Persian work called "the Prince and the Sufi" by a Jewish poet for reading in his community.

== Sikhism ==
Buddha is mentioned as the 23rd avatar of Vishnu in the Chaubis Avtar, a composition in Dasam Granth traditionally and historically attributed to Guru Gobind Singh.

== Taoism ==
Some early Chinese Taoist-Buddhists thought the Buddha to be a reincarnation of Laozi.

== See also ==
- Index of Buddhism-related articles
- Secular Buddhism
