= Kirkjubæjarbók =

Icelandic manuscript

Kirkjubæjarbók (Codex AM 429 12mo) is an Icelandic manuscript produced in around 1500 containing female saints' sagas. It is notable for being the only extant Old-Norse Icelandic legendary which exclusively deals with female saints and for being the only extant text which contains Old Norse-Icelandic prose and poetic accounts of St Dorothy. The book takes its name from the convent of Kirkjubær, which likely held the codex until King Christian III of Denmark dissolved the Icelandic monasteries in the mid sixteenth century.

== Contents ==
The codex contains material in Old-Norse Icelandic and Latin relating to eight saints' legends: St Margaret of Antioch, St Catherine of Alexandria, St Cecilia, St Dorothea of Caesara, St Agnes, St Agatha, St Barbara, and Sts Fides, Spes and Caritas. Apart from the prose and poetry relating to St Dorothy, the legends all exist in other manuscripts written before 1500, though it is the only text which preserves the legend of St Cecilia in its entirety. Wolf suggests that it is likely that the material in the codex was copied from individual lives of saints that were available in Iceland, rather than from another legendary, as the arrangement of the legends appears arbitrary, and is not organised according to the liturgical year.

A gathering of 10 leaves appears to be missing between folios 18v and 19r of the legend of St Catherine and around four leaves from the end of the legend of Fides, Spes and Caritas are also lost. Apart from this, the texts in the codex are complete.

The contents of the codex is given below; unless indicated otherwise, the texts are written in Old Norse-Icelandic:

- St Margaret
  - Margrétar saga
  - Prayer to St. Margaret (Latin)
- St Catherine
  - Katrínar saga
- St Cecilia
  - Cecilíu saga
  - Cecilíu diktur
- Saint Dorothy
  - Dórótheu saga
  - Dorotheudiktur - Dorotheu kvæði
  - A Verse of St. Dorothy (Latin)
- St Agnes
  - Agnesar saga
- St Agatha
  - Agöthu saga
- St Barbara
  - Barbare saga
- Sts Fides, Spes and Caritas
  - Saga af Fides, Spes og Karitas

== Provenance ==
The codex was collected by Árni Magnússon from 'Páll á Flókastoðum', who was likely Páll Ámundason, the administrator of the Kirkjubær's land from 1681-1708. There is no direct record of the codex belonging to the convent; an inventory of 1397 notes that it held 20 Latin and Norse books. However, based on its specialised contents referring to female saints, some of whom were known to be venerated by the nuns at Kirkjubær, Wolf considers there to be 'little doubt' that it was written for convent. She suggests that rather than by being written by the nuns themselves, it may have been produced at the monastery of Þykkvabær.

== Description ==
The codex is formed of 84 leaves of calfskin divided into 11 gatherings, measuring 11.5 cm x 8.8 cm. The codex has been rebound with cardboard plates, but was probably originally bound with a leather cover. Accounting for the missing leaves mentioned above, Wolf suggests that the codex would have originally consisted of 94 or 98 leaves.

The codex was written by at least four scribes and is illustrated using red and blue. There are full-page illustrations of Sts Margaret, Catherine, Cecilia, Dorothy and Agnes, who are distinguished by their attributes. Some of the illustrations may have used those in Teiknibók as models.
