= Icelandic Physiologus =

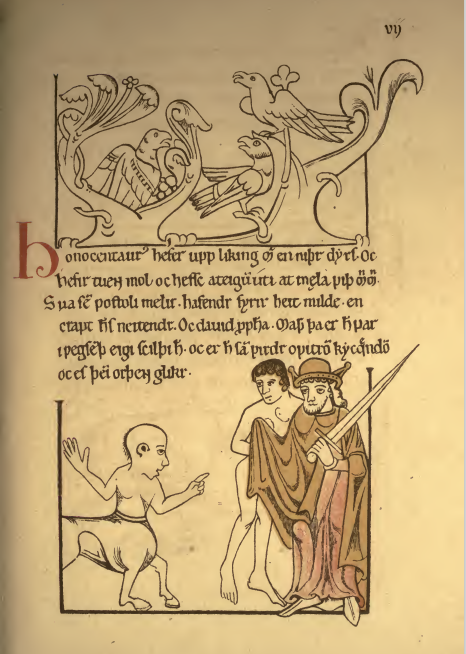
The onocentaur in the Icelandic Physiologus

The Icelandic Physiologus is a translation into Old Icelandic of a Latin translation of the 2nd-century Greek Physiologus. It survives in fragmentary form in two manuscripts, both dating from around 1200, making them the earliest illustrated manuscripts from Iceland and among the earliest Icelandic manuscripts generally. The fragments are significantly different from each other and either represent copies from two separate exemplars or different reworkings of the same text. Both texts also contain material that is not found in standard versions of the Physiologus.

== Summary ==
The Icelandic Physiologus exists in two versions: Fragment A (AM 673 a I 4to) consisting of five entries, and Fragment B (AM 673 a II 4to) with eighteen. There contents are as follows:

- Fragment A:
  1. I. The Phoenix
  2. II. The Hoopoe
  3. III. The Siren
  4. IV. The Horsefly
  5. V. The Onocentaur
- Fragment B:
  1. I. The Hydra
  2. II. The Goat
  3. III. The Wild Ass
  4. IV. The Monkey
  5. V. The Heron
  6. VI. The Coot
  7. VII. The Panther
  8. VIII. The Whale
  9. IX. The Partridge
  10. X. The Onocentaur
  11. XI. The Weasel
  12. XII. The Asp
  13. XIII. The Turtle Dove
  14. XIV. The Deer
  15. XV. The Salamander
  16. XVI. The Kite
  17. XVII. The Boar
  18. XVIII. The Night Heron
  19. XIX. The Elephant

Physiologus A features a moral interpretation of these five animals, with illustrations of the first four. Physiologus B is a more typical version of the Physiologus, whereby the animals are described and given an allegorical meaning. Del Zotto Tozzoli, the manuscript's most recent editor, has suggested that these texts are closer to Bestiaries than the Physiologus.

Latin versions of the Physiologus often contained a myriad of entries that ranged from exotic quadrupeds to mythical beasts to birds, trees and stones. Entries in the Icelandic fragments are visibly more scarce in diversity, focusing most heavily on birds and common forest-dwelling animals, with the notable inclusions of the whale, the Siren, two instances of the Onocentaur, and the monkey. This scarcity could be present for a number of reasons, which range from the lack of Latin scholarship in Iceland that would likely have stifled translation efforts of the Physiologus’ more difficult passages, to the persistent issue regarding Iceland’s geography, whose tundra climate and high Northern location signify the physical absence of a great number of beasts that were present in other manifestations. Problems regarding geography may have prompted translators to leave out certain entries that were of the most confusion, since they may not have even heard of certain beasts, let alone seen them in person.

The most conspicuous absence in this case is of the lion, which appears as the first entry in a great number of European bestiaries of the time. Described in its profile as a Christ figure due to the heroic nature often assigned to it throughout ancient and medieval mythology, the first spot in the Icelandic manuscript is instead replaced by the phoenix, whose behaviors and moralization are of a similar nature. In regards to a reason why this change may be present, one could look at the fact that the majority of entries in the two fragments are of birds, a type of animal that Icelanders would often have seen. Despite the phoenix actually being a mythical beast, the lion was — in a sense — more mythical, given that the image of birds was more present than large, predatory quadrupeds in Iceland.

The whale stands out in the Icelandic Physiologus as the only animal to have two moralized behaviors, and an illustration that presents a close resemblance. Along with the appearances of the different birds that are documented in the two fragments, an argument could be made that the translators had made a conscious choice to include animals that Icelanders would have recognized, aside from the more fantastic beasts that appear. Encounters with whales are documented often in Icelandic literature; there were even laws in the country as far back as the mid-10th Century revolving around their function as crucial resources. The whale’s profile in the bestiary, however, mentions none of its importance to the lives of Icelanders, instead paralleling its description to other manuscripts of the time.

Iceland’s Physiologus also holds some of the same inconsistencies as other manuscripts of the time: the Hydra is often confused between being a bird or some kind of snake, and the odd behavior of the weasel that is often confused in translation — described in Old Norse that it conceives in its mouth and gives birth through its ear — is contrastingly reversed according to different legends. As it was with many of the beasts whose descriptions were distorted through broken translation, it seems to stay true that reaching a point in which the author could create a moralization for the entry held the most importance.

== Manuscripts and preservation ==
Physiologus A survives in the manuscript AM 673 a I 4to, a single bifolium measuring 170–183 mm x 138 mm. It is covered in small holes, which may be explained by Árni Magnússon's note that "I received this leaf in 1705 from Magnús Arason; he took it from a sieve that was used to sift flour in Dýrafjörður."

Physiologus B is preserved in the first fiveleaves of the manuscript AM 673 a II 4to and was collected by Árni Magnússon along with the Teiknibók in around 1700. This manuscript also contains two allegorical homilies on the ship and the rainbow. Two leaves (6v and 7r) were added later and contain a Latin fragment and a medical text from around 1370 in East Norwegian. AM 673 a II 4to and AM 673 b 4to (which contains Plácitus drápa, the earliest preserved drápa) are written in the same hand with the same layout and must have originally belonged to the same manuscript.

== Bibliography ==
=== Editions ===
- Del Zotto Tozzoli, Carla (1992). Il "Physiologus" in Islanda. Biblioteca scandinava di studi, ricerche e testi, 7 (in Italian). Pisa: Giardini.
- Hermannsson, Halldór (1938). The Icelandic Physiologus. Islandica 27. Ithaca, N.Y.: Cornell University Press.
- Dahlerup, Verner (1889). "Physiologus i to islandske bearbejdelser: Udgiven med indledning og oplysninger (Hertil et lithograferet facsimile)". Aarbøger for nordisk Oldkyndighed og Historie: 199–290.

=== Sources cited ===
- Dolcetti Corazza, Vittoria (2007). "Crossing paths in the Middle Ages: the Physiologus in Iceland". In Buzzon, Marina; Bampi, Massimiliano (eds.). The Garden of Crossing Paths: The Manipulation and Rewriting of Medieval Texts : Venice, October 28-30, 2004. Cafoscarina. pp. 225–248. ISBN 978-88-7543-098-6.
