= Salvius =

Salvius may refer to:

== People ==
=== Given name and mononym ===
- Salvius Tryphon (2nd century BC), leader of the Second Servile Revolt
- men of the Salvia gens
  - Marcus Salvius Otho, an emperor of Rome
  - Gāius Salvius Līberālis (history), Roman aristocrat stationed in Britain, and the subject of the Cambridge Latin Course Book II
- Salvius of Carthage, martyr (3rd century)
- Salvius of Albi, saint and bishop of Albi in Gaul (6th century)
- Salvius of Amiens, saint and bishop of Amiens in Gaul (7th century)
- Salvius of Angoulême (8th century), saint and bishop of Angoulême
- Johan Adler Salvius (1590–1652), Swedish diplomat of the 17th century

=== Surname ===
- Johan Adler Salvius (1590–1662) Swedish diplomat
- Laurence Salvius (a.k.a. Laurentii Salvii, 18th century), of Stockholm, publisher of Carl Linnaeus

== Other ==
- Salvius (robot) the open source humanoid robot
