= Rígsþula =

Poem from the Poetic Edda

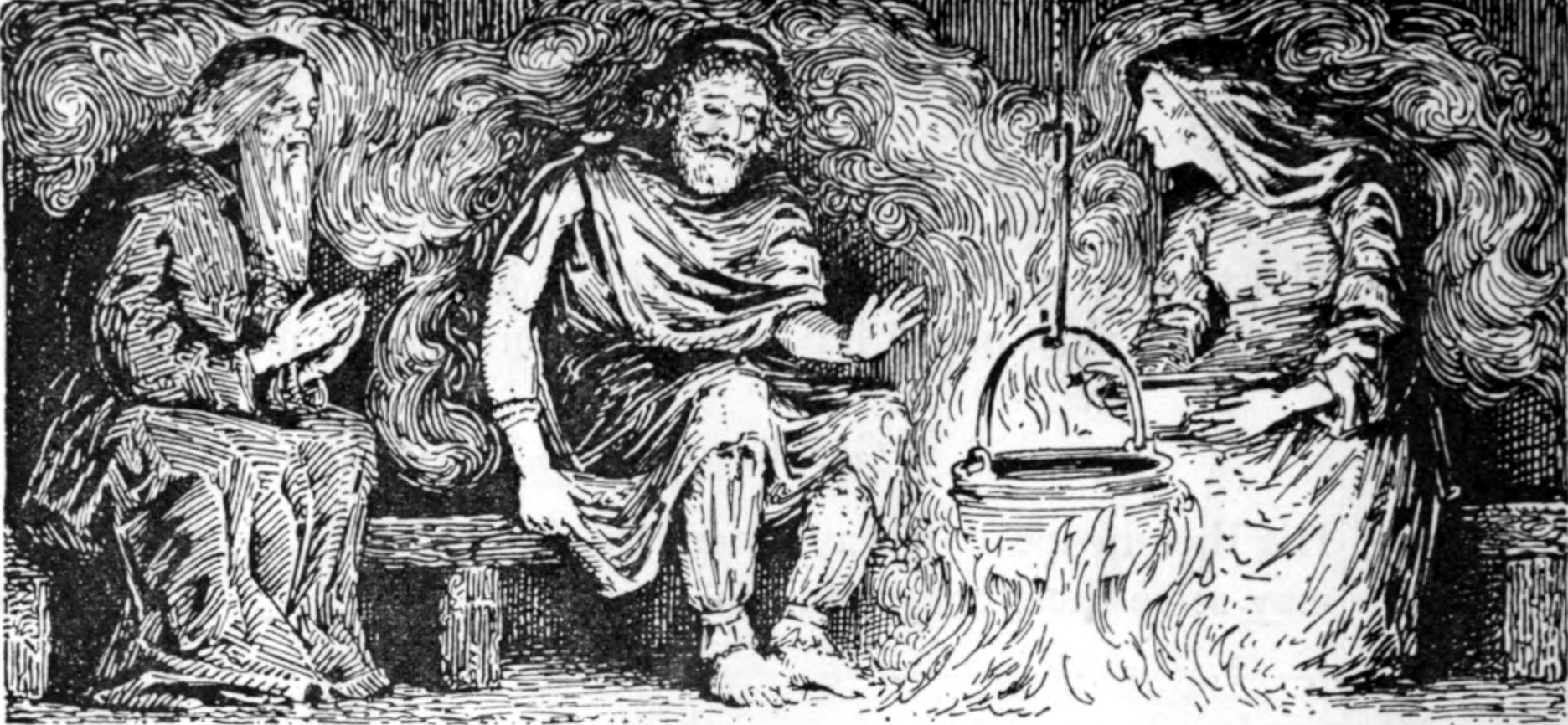
"Rig in Great-grandfather's Cottage" (1908) by W. G. Collingwood

Rígsþula or Rígsmál (Old Norse: 'The Lay of Ríg') is an Eddic poem, preserved in the Codex Wormianus (AM 242 fol), in which a Norse god named Ríg (Old Norse: Rígr), described as "old, wise, mighty and strong", fathers the social classes of mankind. The prose introduction states that Rígr is another name for Heimdall, who is also called the father of mankind in Völuspá. However, there seems to be some confusion of Heimdall and Odinn, see below.

In Rígsþula, Rig wanders through the world and fathers the progenitors of the three classes of human beings as conceived by the poet. The youngest of these sons, Jarl ('earl, nobleman'), inherits the name or title "Ríg" and so in turn does his youngest son, Kon the Young or Kon ungr (Old Norse: konungr, king). This third Ríg was the first true king and the ultimate founder of the state of royalty as appears in the Rígsþula and in two other associated works. In all three sources he is connected with two primordial Danish rulers named Dan and Danþír.

The poem Rígsþula is preserved incomplete on the last surviving sheet in the 14th-century Codex Wormianus, following Snorri Sturluson's Prose Edda. A short prose introduction explains that the god in question was Heimdall, who wandered along the seashore until he came to a farm where he called himself Ríg. The name Rígr appears to be the oblique case of Old Irish rí, ríg "king", cognate to Latin rex, Sanskrit rajan. and Gothic reiks.

The identification of Rígr with Heimdall is supported by his characterization as an ancestor, or kinsman, of humankind in the first two lines of the Eddic poem Völuspá:

I ask for a hearing
of all the holy races
Greater and lesser
kinsmen of Heimdall

However, some scholars, including Finnur Jónsson and Rudolf Simek, have suggested this is a role more appropriate to Óðinn and that the Eddic tradition has thus transferred the name Rígr from him to Heimdall. Since Rígsþula is only preserved in a 14th-century manuscript, it is also plausible that the prose introduction was added by the compiler to conform it to the opening of Völuspá.

== Synopsis ==
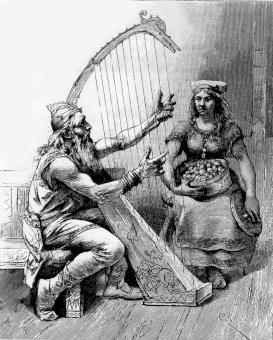
"Heimdall in Rig's shape" by Carl Larsson

Rígr was walking along the shore and came to a farm-hut owned by Ái (great-grandfather) and Edda (great-grandmother). They offered him shelter and poor, rough food for a meal. That night Rígr slept between the pair in their bed and then departed. Nine months later, Edda gave birth to a son who was svartr (swarthy, dark). They named him Þræll (thrall, serf, or slave). Þræll grew up strong but ugly. He married a woman named Thír (slave girl or bondswoman), and they had 12 sons and nine daughters with names mostly suggesting ugliness and squatness. They became the race of serfs.

Traveling further, Rígr came across a pleasant house where a farmer/craftsman, Afi (grandfather), lived with his wife Amma (grandmother). This couple gave him good food and also let him sleep between them. Nine months later, a son, Karl (churl or freeman), was born, who had a ruddy complexion. Karl married a woman named Snör or Snœr (daughter-in-law; sometimes anglicized as Snor), and they had 12 sons and ten daughters with names mostly suggesting a neat appearance or being of good quality. One of the names is smiðr (smith). These became the ancestors of free farmers, craftsmen and herdsmen.

Traveling further, Rígr came to a mansion inhabited by Faðir (Father) and Móðir (Mother). They gave him excellent food served splendidly and, nine months later, Móðir gave birth to a beautiful baby named Jarl (earl or noble), whose hair was blond and who was bleikr (bright white in color). When Jarl grew up and began to handle weapons and to use hawks, hounds, and horses, Rígr reappeared, claimed him as his son, gave him his own name of Rígr, made him his heir, taught him runes, and advised him to seek lordship.

Through warfare, Jarl became lord of 18 homesteads with much wealth besides. He also gained the hand of Erna (Brisk), daughter of Hersir (lord). Erna bore 12 sons to Ríg-Jarl but no daughters. All the sons were given high-sounding names, mostly meaning "son". They became the ancestors of the warrior nobility.

The youngest son, named Konr, was the best of them. He alone learned rune-craft as well as other magic and was able to understand the speech of birds, to quench fire, and to heal minds. He also had the strength of eight normal men. His name was Konr the young (Konr ungr in Old Norse), the name and title to be understood as the origin of the Norse word konungr (king). Konr, like his father, also acquired the name or title of Rígr.

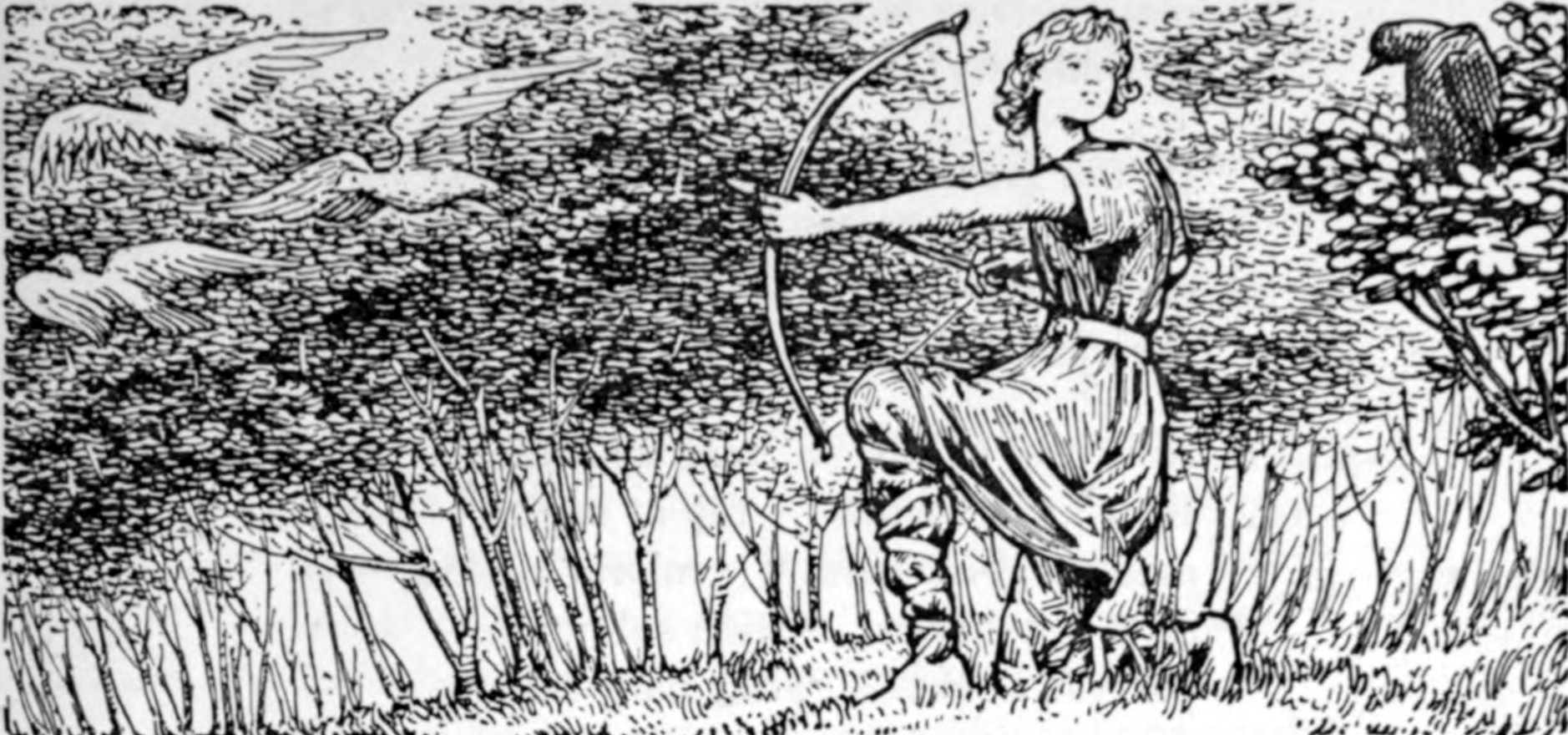
"The Crow warns Konr" (1908) by W. G. Collingwood

One day, when Konr the young was riding through the forest hunting and snaring birds, a crow spoke to him and suggested he would win more if he stopped hunting mere birds and rode to battle against foemen, that he should seek the halls of Dan and Danþír, who were wealthier than he. At that point the poem abruptly cuts off.

== Historical significance ==
A key aspect of historical scholarship on this poem is that theories of date and provenance range from the 10th to the 13th century and from the Old Norse-Icelandic-speaking areas of the British Isles to Norway. Initially it was viewed as an ancient poem; later research postulated that it came from the 13th century, but some modern scholars continue to place it as early as the Viking Age. Additionally, the dating problem is complicated by the poem's history of oral transmission, which tends to warp pieces as long as the Rígsþula as they are recited numerous times. In terms of provenance, although there has been some speculation in the past as to Celtic authorship of the poem, the modern consensus is to ascribe Icelandic authorship to it.

The historical significance of the poem would necessarily change based on where in history the text itself is situated. There is of course a need to remember the literary nature of the poem when reading it as a historical source as certain aspects do not translate literally and must be read allegorically and stereotypically. For example, despite the explicit and detailed physical differences between the classes in the poem, slaves, freeman, and aristocrats did not necessarily look different. Thus although qualitative aspects of the social classes are difficult to determine from the text, there is broader understanding that can be gained.

Firstly, the poem presents a view of Þræll in line with certain slave tropes found throughout Old Norse literature, as dark, short, stupid, gloomy and ugly. Þræll and his aged parents live as tenants in one farmhouse and he and his sons engage largely in menial labor such as keeping the household in firewood and cutting turf. Although his working status is indeterminate, the field work in particular is fairly typical of the kind of services that slaves would render to a master in the Old Norse world. Thus, the use of slave tropes and the focus on labor can be read as descriptive of the typical lifestyle of the lower class, whether slaves or simply lower-class laborers.

The middle class of freemen, who are descended from Karl, are less easy to pin down, but the scholarly consensus seems to be that Karl "represents the class of free-born peasant proprietor called 'bondi' or 'bui', ... a kind of hereditary aristocracy, self-governed, and absolutely independent". Specifically, Karl is described as fairly prosperous, given that he and his family are landed proprietors or freeholders who own the farm building on the land they work. Additional details reveal the relative comfort of his life: his mother, Amma's stylish shoulder ornaments and the free distribution of gold rings to the guests at his wedding. Karl therefore represents a class who, while they are farmers, are able to maintain a comfortable life with material pleasures and luxuries.

Finally we are presented with the class of Jarl or earl, who represents "the idle aristocrat... whose sole occupations are raiding, hunting, and swimming". Born to parents who live in even more luxury than those of Karl, Jarl has bright eyes and shining hair and he lives a life of success, able to conquer and distribute his spoils to his dependents very much in the style of ancient Viking heroes.

The poem also presents Konr as representative of the special class of kings and in examining what his character represents, scholar Thomas Hill's view was:

Although the poem is concerned with the origins of kingship, it seems to reflect a specifically aristocratic rather than royalist view, in that the king who begins to emerge in the final stanzas of the poem is not set apart by birth from the other sons of Jarl, and is in fact the youngest son.

In fact, Konr gets his power directly from Ríg, and the idea of a king is therefore of a man who is blessed by the gods, though not necessarily descended from them in the strict patrilineal fashion typical of Western monarchies.

Given the very different ways in which these three classes are represented both physically and in terms of their activities, the etiological myth of Rígsþula can be seen as implying that the three classes are essentially different species. A second interpretation, however, is that "the names of the three couples - great-grandfather and great-grandmother, grandfather and grandmother, and finally father and mother - might seem to imply that the various classes of mankind share a common heritage". The poem has been viewed as suggestive of social progress over time, so that one class may aspire to move up. According to Hill, however, most agree that this second view is too benevolent and that in fact the poem reveals that for the Vikings:

The different orders of mankind are indeed fixed and unchangeable, but in the very beginning there was a certain kinship between the different orders of mankind, a kinship suggested by the fixed and yet linked sequence of the genealogical chain.

== Theories ==
A marriage by Konr the young into the family of Dan and Danp seems to be where the tale was headed, as seen in the two other sources that mention this Rígr. According to Arngrímur Jónsson's Latin epitome of the lost Skjöldungasaga:

Ríg (Rigus) was a man not the least among the great ones of his time. He married the daughter of a certain Danp, lord of Danpsted, whose name was Dana; and later, having won the royal title for his province, left as his heir his son by Dana, called Dan or Danum, all of whose subjects were called Danes.

The other tradition appears in chapter 20 of the Ynglinga Saga section of Snorri Sturluson's Heimskringla. The story speaks of King Dygvi of Sweden:

Dygvi's mother was Drótt, a daughter of King Danp, the son of Ríg, who was first called konungr in the Danish tongue. His descendants always afterwards considered the title of konungr the title of highest dignity. Dygvi was the first of his family to be called konungr, for his predecessors had been called dróttinn [chieftain], and their wives dróttning, and their court drótt (war band). Each of their race was called Yngvi, or Ynguni, and the whole race together Ynglingar. Queen Drótt was a sister of King Dan Mikillati, from whom Denmark took its name.

Despite genealogical discrepancies (to be evaded only by imagining more than one Danpr and more than one Danr) the accounts relate a common tradition about the origin of the title konungr (king).

Konr the young, whose magical abilities are so emphasized, is as much a magician as a warrior: a magician king, perhaps a sacred king. Georges Dumézil pointed out that Kon alone represents the supernatural function, represented by the Brahmin caste in India, the flamen function in Rome, the druids in some Celtic cultures, and the clergy in the three estates of medieval Europe. Instead of the three estates of clergy/priest, warrior, and commoner, with serfs outside the system, the Rígsþula presents three estates or castes in which the clergy/priest class has been subsumed within the warrior class and identified with royalty. Also, although in Rome and India the color white is assigned to the sacred and to priests and red to warriors, here the noble warrior is white in color while the red coloration is ascribed instead to the commoner in place of the green, blue, or yellow color assigned to the lower classes in other cultures associated with Proto-Indo-European society. Dumézil saw this as a Germanic adaptation of the Indo-European heritage.

Jean Young and Ursula Dronke, among others, have suggested that the Rígsþula story is Celtic in origin and that the name Rígr is an indication of this.
