= Paul Peeters =

Belgian Jesuit priest

Paul Peeters SJ
- President of the Bollandist Society
- Church: Catholic Church
- Installed: 1941
- Term ended: 18 August 1950

Orders
- Ordination: 18 August 1901

Personal details
- Born: 20 September 1870 Tournai, Belgium
- Died: 18 August 1950 (aged 79) Brussels, Belgium
- Occupation: Scholar, historian, writer
- Education: Notre-Dame Jesuit college, Tournai

Paul Peeters (20 September 1870 – 18 August 1950) was a Belgian Jesuit priest, Bollandist, and president of the Bollandist Society from 1941 until his death in 1950. He was known as a scholar of Eastern Christianity and Eastern hagiography of saints, and was a talented linguist who learned many languages of the region, studied the interplay of works and their translations, and made them accessible in French translation.

== Biography ==
=== Early life and education ===
Paul Peeters was born on 20 September 1870 in Tournai, the son of Jules Peeters and Marie de Brouwer. Peeters entered the Society of Jesus on 23 September 1887, following the completion of his secondary education at Notre-Dame College in Tournai. He underwent his novitiate in Arlon and subsequently followed the standard course of Jesuit training. He taught Latin, New Testament Greek, French, and mathematics at the Jesuit juniorate of Drongen Abbey (Tronchiennes) from 1893 to 1898.

During this period, he began studying Russian and Armenian, publishing several essays on the style of these languages. For health reasons, he was sent to complete his studies in theology in Beirut, Lebanon. Following his ordination to the priesthood on 18 August 1901, he returned to Beirut to study Arabic at Saint Joseph University in 1902–1903. After returning to Belgium, he completed his tertianship and shortly thereafter, in 1904, joined the Bollandist Society in Brussels, where he would spend the rest of his active life.

=== Bollandist ===
Peeters researched languages of the East and their interplay. He compiled an inventory of the hagiographical texts available in Syriac, Coptic, Ethiopic (Ge'ez), Arabic, and Armenian. Beginning in 1911, he undertook the study of Georgian texts. At the time, it was generally assumed that all or almost all Oriental hagiographical texts were derived from Greek originals of Byzantine literature. Peeters criticized this view and argued that a much more fluid web of multi-lingual translations existed. For example, Barlaam and Josaphat was believed by scholars of the time to be an original Greek composition by John of Damascus. Peeters convincingly showed that the Greek was actually a translation of a Georgian work, the Balavariani by the monk Euthymius the Athonite, and that this Georgian work was a translation of the Arabic Kitab Bilawhar wa-Yudasaf, which likely came from a Sanskrit or other Indian source. He provided other examples, such as an Armenian autobiography of Pseudo-Dionysius the Areopagite that was translated from Georgian, which itself had been translated from Arabic, with no known Greek original. Peeters' work was published in the influential 1922 article Traductions et traducteurs dans l'hagiographie orientale à l'époque byzantine ("Translations and Translators in Oriental Hagiography in the Byzantine Period"). Other articles in the same field of research followed.

This work culminated in what he considered his academic testament, the book Orient et Byzance (Orient and Byzantium), published in Brussels in 1950. He published numerous studies on Oriental hagiography in the third and fourth volumes for November of the Acta Sanctorum. These were the first volumes of the Acta Sanctorum collection to include texts in Georgian, Arabic, and Ethiopic scripts, continuing work he had begun publishing in the Analecta Bollandiana in 1906.

Peeters also studied history. He produced several biographical sketches of deceased Jesuit colleagues for the 1937 centenary of the resumption of Bollandist work by the Belgian Jesuits, and for the 1942 tercentenary of the publication of the first two volumes of the Acta Sanctorum.

After working under the direction of President Hippolyte Delehaye for around thirty years, he succeeded him as president of the Bollandist Society in 1941.

=== Honors and recognition ===
In 1930, Peeters was appointed alongside Hippolyte Delehaye as a consultant to the historical section of the Roman Congregation of Rites, and in 1942, as a foreign corresponding member of the Pontifical Roman Academy of Archaeology. He was elected a full member of the Royal Academy of Belgium (Letters Section) in 1933, and a foreign corresponding member of the Académie des Inscriptions et Belles-Lettres in Paris in 1945. He was awarded honorary doctorates in theology from the University of Strasbourg (1946) and in philosophy and Oriental history from the Catholic University of Louvain (1947). In 1950, he received the Quinquennial Prize for Historical Sciences in Brussels for the period 1936–1940.

=== Death ===
Paul Peeters died in Etterbeek at St. Michael's College, Brussels on 18 August 1950.

== Selected works ==
- Bibliotheca Hagiographica Orientalis, Brussels, 1910
- Évangiles apocryphes - L'Évangile de l'Enfance [Apocryphal Gospels - The Gospel of Infancy], a translation of the Armenian Infancy Gospel. Syriac, Arabic, and Armenian versions, 2 volumes, Auguste Picard, Paris, 1914.
- "Traductions et traducteurs dans l'hagiographie orientale à l'époque byzantine", in Analecta Bollandiana, vol. 40, 1922, pp. 241–298
- L'Œuvre des Bollandistes, Brussels, 1942
- Figures bollandiennes contemporaines, Brussels, 1948
- Orient et Byzance, Brussels, 1950

Following his death, around forty of his articles and essays were collected and published in two volumes under the title:

- Recherches d'histoire, de philologie et d'hagiographie orientales, 2 volumes, Brussels, 1951
