= Erna (mythology) =

Figure in Norse mythology

In Norse mythology according to the Eddic poem Rígsþula, Erna was the mother of twelve sons by Jarl, the ancestors of the class of warriors in Norse society. Her father was Hersir, a tribal chief.
