= Chardri =

Anglo-Norman poet

Chardri (late 12th–early 13th centuries) was an Anglo-Norman poet, probably from western England. His pen name is probably an anagram of Richard.

Three of his poems, all in rhyming octosyllabic couplets, have survived:

- La vie de seint Josaphaz presents Barlaam and Josaphat, a Christianized version of the life of Buddha, 2954 lines
- La vie des set dormanz records the story of the Seven Sleepers of Ephesus, 1898 lines
- Le petit plet, 1780 lines

His work is transmitted in manuscripts alongside The Owl and the Nightingale.
