= Barlaam and Josaphat =

Legendary Christian saints

Saint Josaphat of India
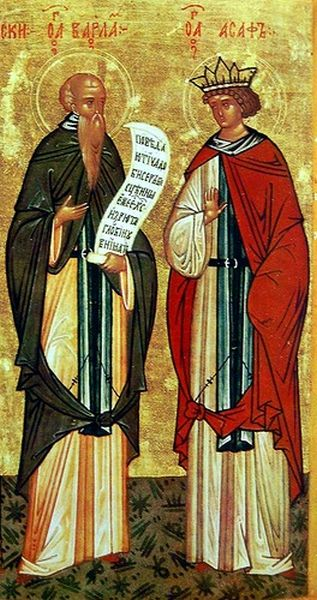
- Fragment of an icon: St. Athanasius of Athonite, Barlaam of India, Joasaph of India. End of the 15th - beginning of the 16th centuries. From the Cathedral of Saint Sophia in Novgorod

Prince
- Born: India
- Venerated in: Eastern Orthodox Church; Roman Catholic Church
- Feast: 26 August (Greek Orthodox Church); 19 November (Orthodox Church in Slavic tradition); 27 November (Catholic Church)

Saint Barlaam of India
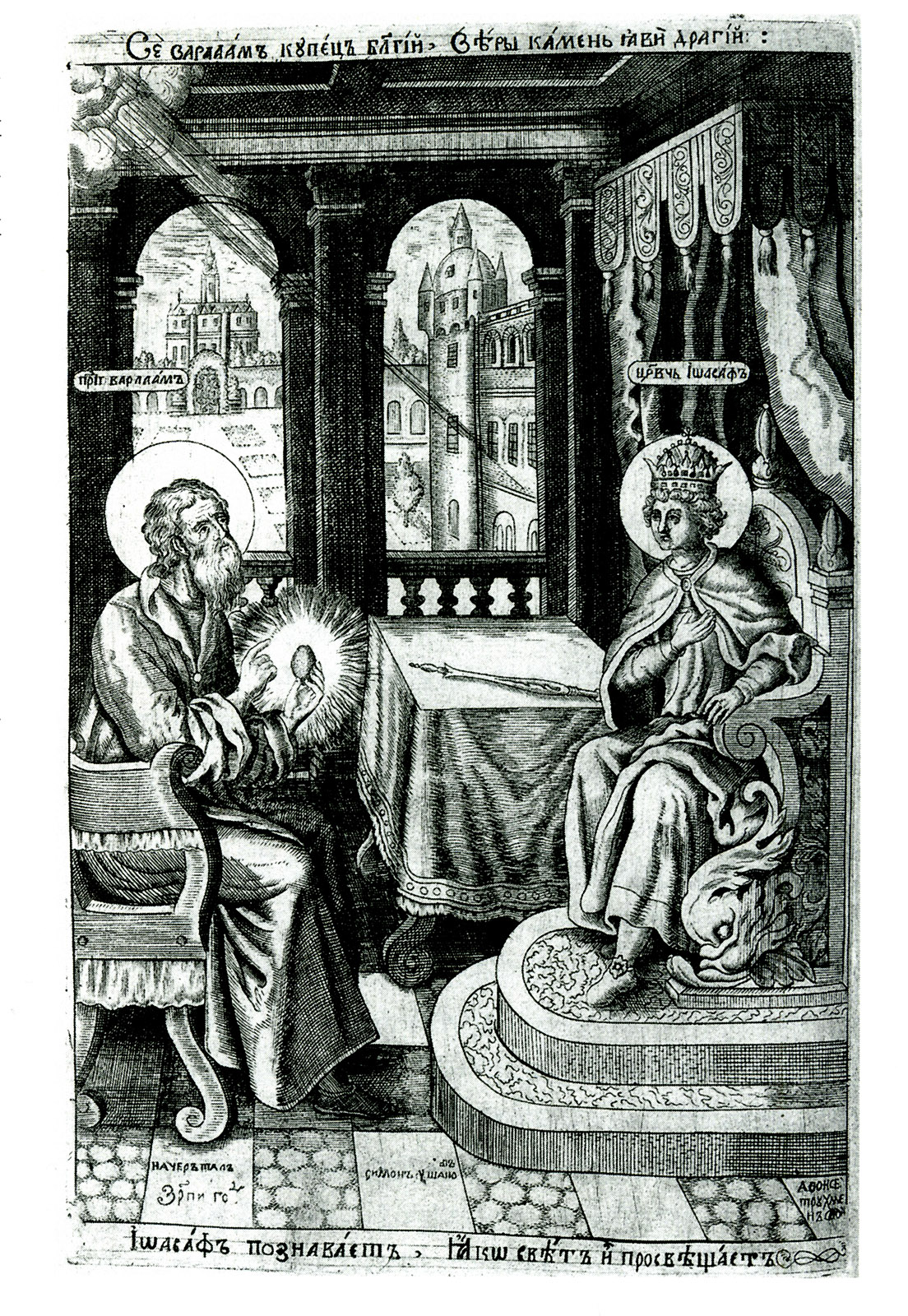
- Barlaam and Joasaph, a 1680 Russian engraving

Hieromonk
- Venerated in: Eastern Orthodox Church; Catholic Church
- Feast: 26 August (Greek Orthodox Church); 19 November (Orthodox Church in Slavic tradition); 27 November (Catholic Church)

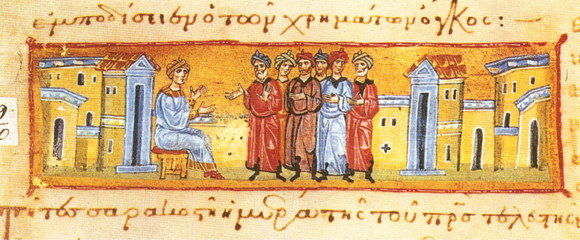
A Christian depiction of Josaphat, 12th century manuscript

Barlaam and Josaphat, also known as Bilawhar and Budhasaf, are Christian saints. Their story tells of the conversion of Josaphat to Christianity. According to tradition, an Indian king persecuted the Christian Church in his realm. After astrologers predicted that his own son would some day become a Christian, the king imprisoned the young prince Josaphat, who nevertheless met the hermit Saint Barlaam and converted to Christianity. After much tribulation the young prince's father accepted the Christian faith, turned over his throne to Josaphat, and retired to the desert to become a hermit. Josaphat himself later abdicated and went into seclusion with his old teacher Barlaam. The story is thought to be a Christianized and later version of the story of Siddhartha Gautama, who became the Buddha.

== History ==
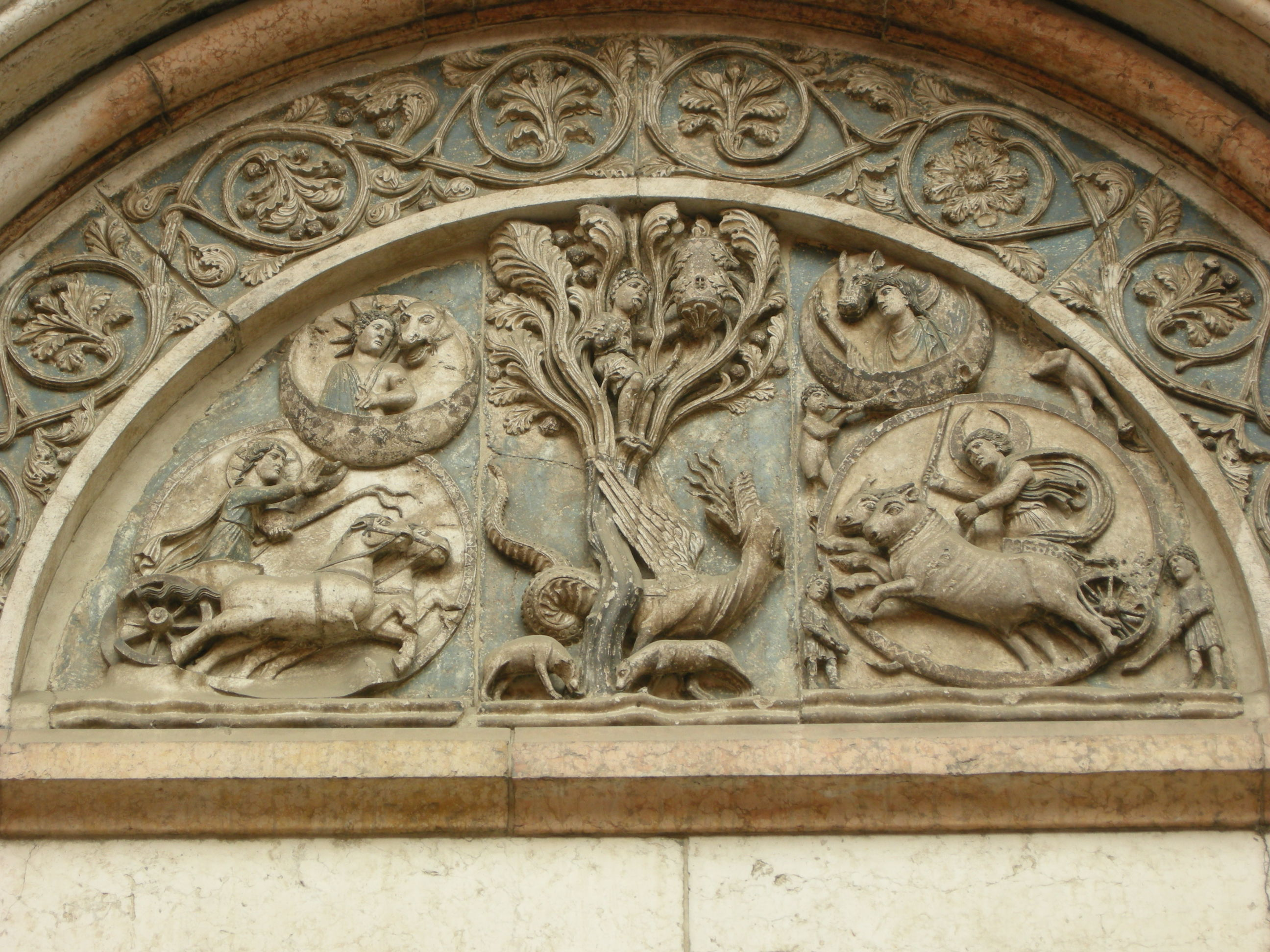
Depiction of a parable from Barlaam and Josaphat at the Baptistery of Parma, Italy

The tale derives from a second to fourth century Sanskrit Mahayana Buddhist text, via a Manichaean version, then the Arabic Kitāb Bilawhar wa-Būd̠āsaf (Book of Bilawhar and Budhasaf), current in Baghdad in the eighth century, from where it entered into Middle Eastern Christian circles before appearing in European versions.

The first Christianized adaptation was the Georgian epic Balavariani dating back to the 10th century. A Georgian monk, Euthymius of Athos, translated the story into Greek, some time before he died in an accident while visiting Constantinople in 1028. There the Greek adaptation was translated into Latin in 1048 and soon became well known in Western Europe as Barlaam and Josaphat. The Greek legend of "Barlaam and Ioasaph" was sometimes attributed to the 8th-century John of Damascus and was thought to be an original composition of his in 18th- and 19th-century scholarship. The idea of the legend originating from Byzantine Greek was refuted by scholars F. C. Conybeare and Paul Peeters, who showed the Georgian, Arabic, and Sanskrit origins of the work.

The story of Barlaam and Josaphat was popular in the Middle Ages, appearing in such works as the Golden Legend, and a scene there involving three caskets eventually appeared, via Caxton's English translation of a Latin version, in Shakespeare's "The Merchant of Venice". The poet Chardri produced an Anglo-Norman version, La vie de seint Josaphaz, in the 13th century. The story of Josaphat and Barlaam also occupies a great part of book xv of the Speculum Historiale (Mirror of History) by the 13th-century French encyclopedist Vincent of Beauvais.

One of the Marco Polo manuscripts notes the remarkable similarity between the tale of "Sergamoni Borcan" (i.e. Sakyamuni Burkhan; the name that Polo recorded the Mongols using for the Buddha) and St. Josaphat, apparently unaware of the origins of the Josaphat story.

Two Middle High German versions were produced: one, the "Laubacher Barlaam", by Bishop Otto II of Freising and another, Barlaam und Josaphat, a romance in verse, by Rudolf von Ems. The latter was described as "perhaps the flower of religious literary creativity in the German Middle Ages" by Heinrich Heine.

In the 16th century, the story of Josaphat was retold as a defence of monastic life during the Protestant Reformation and of free will against Protestant doctrines regarding predestination.

== Legend ==
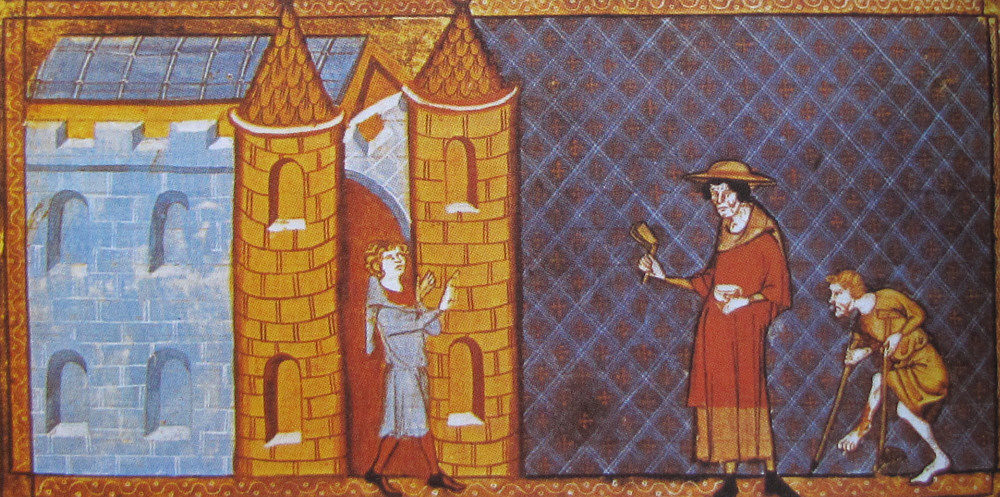
Prince Josaphat greets the leper and the crippled. Illustration from a 14th-century copy of Vincent de Beauvais' Speculum Historiale.

According to the legend, King Abenner in India persecuted the Christian Church in his realm, founded by the Apostle Thomas. When astrologers predicted that his own son would some day become a Christian, Abenner had the young prince Josaphat isolated from external contact. Despite the imprisonment, Josaphat met the hermit Saint Barlaam and converted to Christianity. Josaphat kept his faith even in the face of his father's anger and persuasion. Eventually, Abenner converted, turned over his throne to Josaphat, and retired to the desert to become a hermit. Josaphat himself later abdicated and went into seclusion with his old teacher Barlaam.

== Names ==
In this context, the name Josaphat is derived from the Sanskrit bodhisattva. The Sanskrit word was changed to Bodisav in Middle Persian texts in the 6th or 7th century, then to Būdhasaf or Yūdhasaf in an 8th-century Arabic document (Arabic initial "b" ﺑ changed to "y" ﻳ by duplication of a dot in handwriting). This became Iodasaph in Georgian in the 10th century, and that name was adapted as Ioasaph (Ἰωάσαφ) in Greece in the 11th century, and then was assimilated to Iosaphat/Josaphat in Latin.

The name Barlaam derives from the Arabic name Bilawhar (بِلَوْهَر) borrowed through Georgian (ბალაჰვარ Balahvar) into Byzantine Greek (Βαρλαάμ Barlaám). The Arabic Bilawhar has historically been thought to derive from the Sanskrit bhagavan, an epithet of the Buddha, but this derivation is unproven and others have been proposed. Almuth Degener suggests derivation from Sanskrit purohita through a hypothetical Middle Persian intermediate.

The name of Josaphat's father, King Abenner, derives from the Greek name Abenner (Ἀβεννήρ), although another Greek version of the legend gives this name as Avenir (Ἄβενιρ). These Greek names were adapted from the Georgian Abeneser (აბენესერ; later shortened to აბენეს, Abenes), which was itself derived from the Arabic version of the legend where he is named King Junaysar (جُنَيسَر). According to I.V. Abuladze, during borrowing from Arabic to Georgian, misplaced i'jām resulted in the misreading of Junaysar as Habeneser, after which the initial H- was omitted. The origin of the Arabic name is unclear.

== Sainthood ==
=== Feast days ===
Barlaam and Josaphat were included in earlier editions of the Roman Martyrology with a joint feast day on 27 November, however, they were not included in the Roman Missal. Since 1960, a different Saint Josaphat – the bishop and martyr Josephat Kuntsevych – has been commemorated on 16 November.

Barlaam and Josaphat were entered into the Greek Orthodox liturgical calendar on 26 August Julian (8 September Gregorian), and into liturgical calendar of the Slavic tradition of the Eastern Orthodox Church, on 19 November Julian (2 December Gregorian).

== Texts ==
A page from the 1896 edition by Joseph Jacobs at the University of Toronto (Click on image to read the book)

There are a large number of different books in various languages, all dealing with the lives of Saints Barlaam and Josaphat in India. In this hagiographic tradition, the life and teachings of Josaphat have many parallels with those of the Buddha. "But not till the mid-nineteenth century was it recognised that, in Josaphat, the Buddha had been venerated as a Christian saint for about a thousand years." This was ascertained through the researches of Edouard de Laboulaye and Felix Liebrecht in 1859-1860. The authorship of the work is disputed. The origins of the story may be a Central Asian manuscript written in the Manichaean tradition. This book was translated into Georgian and Arabic.

=== Greek manuscripts ===
The best-known version in Europe comes from a separate, but not wholly independent, source, written in Greek, and, although anonymous, attributed to "John the monk". It was first attributed to John of Damascus in the 12th century. Although this attribution was attacked in the 19th century, George Ratcliffe Woodward and Harold Mattingly sum up the arguments in favor of John of Damascus' authorship as follows: The work's doctrine is remarkably similar to St. John's, to the point where "in many passages the resemblance amounts almost to verbal identity"; there are frequent quotations from St. John's favorite authors, such as St. Gregory of Nazianus and St. Basil; "The defence of images, coupled with the denunciation of Idolatry, the enthusiasm for the monastic ideal, and the scant regard shown for the bishops and the secular clergy, almost compel us to place the work in the time of the Iconoclastic Controversy. The position, taken up and defended, is exactly that of the Icon-venerators; and we regard this fact alone as conclusive evidence for an eighth century date."; that St. John was often known as "John the Monk", so the fact that he was not specifically named in the earliest manuscripts does not rule him out.

Nonetheless, many modern scholars do not accept this attribution, citing much evidence pointing to Euthymius of Athos, a Georgian who died in 1028.

The modern edition of the Greek text, from the 160 surviving variant manuscripts (2006), with introduction (German, 2009) is published as Volume 6 of the works of John the Damascene by the monks of the Abbey of Scheyern, edited by Robert Volk. It was included in the edition due to the traditional ascription, but marked "spuria" as the translator is the Georgian monk Euthymius the Hagiorite (c. 955–1028) at Mount Athos and not John the Damascene of the monastery of Saint Sabas in the Judaean Desert. The 2009 introduction includes an overview.

=== English manuscripts ===
Among the manuscripts in English, two of the most important are the British Library MS Egerton 876 (the basis for Ikegami's book) and MS Peterhouse 257 (the basis for Hirsh's book) at the University of Cambridge. The book contains a tale similar to The Three Caskets found in the Gesta Romanorum and later in William Shakespeare's The Merchant of Venice.

=== Editions ===
==== Arabic ====
- E. Rehatsek – The Book of the King's Son and the Ascetic – English translation (1888) based on the Halle Arabic manuscript
- Gimaret – Le livre de Bilawhar et Budasaf – French translation of Bombay Arabic manuscript

==== Georgian ====
- David Marshall Lang: The Balavariani: A Tale from the Christian East California University Press: Los Angeles, 1966. Translation of the long version Georgian work that probably served as a basis for the Greek text. Jerusalem MS140
- David Marshall Lang: Wisdom of Balahvar – the short Georgian version. Jerusalem MS36, 1960
- The Balavariani (Georgian and Arabic ბალავარიანი, بلوریانی)

==== Greek ====
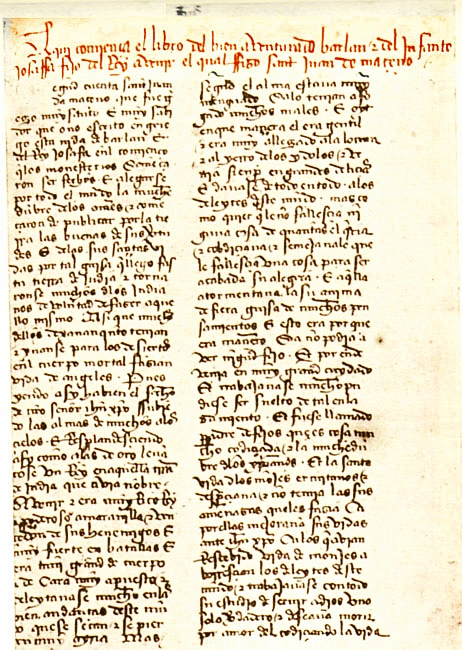
First page of the Barlam and Josephat manuscript at the Biblioteca Nacional de España, 14th or 15th century

- Robert Volk, Die Schriften des Johannes von Damaskos VI/1: Historia animae utilis de Barlaam et Ioasaph (spuria). Patristische Texte und Studien Bd. 61. Berlin: Walter de Gruyter, 2009. Pp. xlii, 596. ISBN 978-3-11-019462-3.
- Robert Volk, Die Schriften des Johannes von Damaskos VI/2: Historia animae utilis de Barlaam et Ioasaph (spuria). Text und zehn Appendices. Patristische Texte und Studien Bd. 60. Berlin: Walter de Gruyter, 2006. Pp. xiv, 512. ISBN 978-3-11-018134-0.
- Boissonade – older edition of the Greek
- G.R. Woodward and H. Mattingly – older English translation of the Greek Online Harvard University Press, Cambridge MA, 1914
- S. Ioannis Damasceni Historia, de vitis et rebvs gestis SS. Barlaam Eremitae, & Iosaphat Indiæ regis. Iacobo Billio Prunæo, S. Michaëlis in eremo Cœnobiarcha interprete. Coloniae, In Officina Birckmannica, sumptibus Arnoldi Mylij. Anno M. D. XCIII. – Modern Latin translation of the Greek.
- Vitæ et res gestæ SS. Barlaam eremitæ, et Iosaphat Indiæ regis. S. Io. Damasceno avctores, Iac. Billio Prunæo interprete. Antverpiæ, Sumptibus Viduæ & hæredum Ioannis Belleri. 1602. – Modern Latin translation of the Greek.
- S. Ioannis Damasceni Historia, de vitis et rebvs gestis SS. Barlaam Eremitæ, & Iosaphat Indiæ regis. Iacobo Billio Prvnæo, S. Michaëlis in eremo Cœnobiarcha, interprete. Nune denuò accuratissimè à P. Societate Iesv revisa & correcta. Coloniæ Agrippinæ, Apud Iodocvm Kalcoven, M. DC. XLIII. – Modern Latin translation of the Greek.

==== Latin ====
- Codex VIII B10, Naples
- Reading Medieval Latin with the Legend of Barlaam and Josaphat, ed. by Donka D. Marcus (2018) (an edition of Jacobus de Voragine's shortened, Latin version)

==== Ethiopic ====
- Baralâm and Yĕwâsĕf. Budge, E.A. Wallis. Baralam and Yewasef: Being the Ethiopic Version of a Christianized Recension of the Buddhist Legend of the Buddha and the Bodhisattva. Published: London; New York: Kegan Paul; Biggleswade, UK: Distributed by Extenza-Turpin Distribution; New York: Distributed by Columbia University Press, 2004.

==== Old French ====
- Jean Sonet, Le roman de Barlaam et Josaphat (Namur, 1949–52) after Tours MS949
- Leonard Mills, after Vatican MS660
- Zotenberg and Meyer, after Gui de Cambrai MS1153

==== Catalan ====
- Gerhard Moldenhauer Vida de Barlan MS174

==== Provençal ====
- Ferdinand Heuckenkamp, version in langue d'Oc
- Jeanroy, Provençal version, after Heuckenkamp
- Nelli, Troubadours, after Heuckenkamp
- Occitan, BN1049

==== Italian ====
- G.B. Bottari, edition of various old Italian MS.
- Georg Maas, old Italian MS3383

==== Portuguese ====
- Hilário da Lourinhã. Vida do honorado Infante Josaphate, filho del Rey Avenir, versão de frei Hilário da Lourinhã: e a identificação, por Diogo do Couto (1542–1616), de Josaphate com o Buda. Introduction and notes by Margarida Corrêa de Lacerda. Lisboa: Junta de Investigações do Ultramar, 1963.

==== Serbian ====
- "Barlaam and Josaphat" in the Eastern Orthodox version comes from John of Damascus, copied and translated into Old Church Slavonic by anonymous monk-scribes from the 9th-11th centuries, and in modern Serbian by Ava Justin Popović ("Lives of the Saints" for November, pp. 563–590), an abridged version of which is given in the Ohrid Prologue of Bishop Nikolaj Velimirović.

==== Croatian ====
Three Croatian versions exist, all translations from Italian. The older Shtokavian untitled version originated in the Republic of Ragusa and was transcribed to a codex from an earlier source in the 17th century, while the later Chakavian translations, one manuscript and one printed, originated in the beginning of the 18th century. The book was published by Petar Maçukat in Venice in 1708 and titled Xivot S[veto]ga Giosafata obrachien od Barlaama (Life of S[aint] Josaphat, converted by Barlaam) and is currently held in the National and University Library in Zagreb. Both manuscripts were published in 1913 by Czech Slavist Josef Karásek and Croatian philologist Franjo Fancev and reprinted in 1996. The Chakavian translations had a common source while the older Shtokavian one used an earlier Italian version as well as the Golden Legend.

- Petar Maçukat (translator). Xivot S[veto]ga Giosafata obrachien od Barlaama s yednim verscem nadostavglien radi xena bitti osudyen. Venice: Published by Domenico Lovisa, 1708.
- Josip Karásek and Franjo Fancev (editors). Dubrovačke legende. Prague: Published for Hohen Unterrichtsministeriums in Wien and the Hlávka family fond by Edvard Leschinger, 1913.
- Branimir Donat (editor). Dubrovačke legende. Zagreb: Published for Zorka Zane by Dora Krupićeva, 1996 (Reprint). ISBN 953-96680-1-8
- Vesna Badurina Stipčević (editor). Hrvatska srednjovjekovna proza. Zagreb: Published for Igor Zidić by Matica hrvatska, 2013. ISBN 978-953-150-319-8

Hungarian

- Translation from the Golden Legend in the Kazincy codex between 1526 and 1541.

==== English ====
- Hirsh, John C. (editor). Barlam and Iosaphat: A Middle English Life of Buddha. Edited from MS Peterhouse 257. London; New York: Published for the Early English Text Society by the Oxford University Press, 1986. ISBN 0-19-722292-7
- Ikegami, Keiko. Barlaam and Josaphat: A Transcription of MS Egerton 876 With Notes, Glossary, and Comparative Study of the Middle English and Japanese Versions, New York: AMS Press, 1999. ISBN 0-404-64161-X
- John Damascene, Barlaam and Ioasaph (Loeb Classical Library). David M. Lang (introduction), G. R. Woodward (translator), Harold Mattingly (translator)· Publisher: Loeb Classical Library, W. Heinemann; 1967, 1914. ISBN 0-674-99038-2
- MacDonald, K.S. (editor). The Story of Barlaam and Joasaph: Buddhism and Christianity. With philological introduction and notes to the Vernon, Harleian and Bodleian versions, by John Morrison. Calcutta: Thacker, Spink, 1895.

==== Old Norse ====
Barlaams saga ok Jósafats is an Old Norse (specifically Old Norwegian) rendering of the story of Barlaam and Josaphat. This Old Norwegian version is based on a Latin translation from the 12th century; the saga of Guðmundur Arason records that it was translated by King Haakon III Sverresson (died 1204). There are several other Old Norse versions of the same story, translated independently from different sources. There are two Old Swedish versions, the older of which draws on the Golden Legend, while the younger uses the Speculum historiale as its main source. The early sixteenth-century Icelandic legendary Reykjahólarbók includes a version translated from Low German.

- Magnus Rindal (editor). Barlaams ok Josaphats saga. Oslo: Published for Kjeldeskriftfondet by Norsk historisk kjeldeskrift-insitutt, 1981. ISBN 82-7061-275-8
- Keyser, R.; Unger, C. R. (1851). Barlaams ok Josaphats saga: En religiös romantisk fortælling om Barlaam og Josaphat. Christiania: Christiania, Trykt paa Feilberg & Landmark.

==== Tibetan ====
- Rgya Tch'er Rol Pa – ou: Développement des jeux, Philippe Édouard Foucaux (1811–1894) 1847. Lalitavistara

==== Hebrew ====
- Avraham ben Shmuel ha-Levi Ibn Hasdai, Ben hammelekh vehannazir (13th century)
- Habermann, Avraham Meir (ed.), Avraham ben Hasdai, Ben hammelekh vehannazir, Jerusalem: Mahberot lesifrut – Mossad haRav Kook 1950 (in Hebrew).
- Abraham ben Shemuel Halevi ibn Hasdai, Ben hamelekh vehanazir, Ed. by Ayelet Oettinger, Universitat Tel Aviv, Tel Aviv 2011 (in Hebrew).

== See also ==
- Gautama Buddha in world religions
- Thomas the Apostle
- Buddhism and Christianity
- Greco-Buddhism
- Life is a Dream, Spanish play incorporating the theme of the imprisoned prince
