= Salvius of Carthage =

Salvius of Carthage was Christian martyr, probably of the 3rd century. His shrine was at Carthage.

Bishop Augustine of Hippo preached a sermon in his honour. Gregory of Tours records that he was an opponent of Arianism. He is mentioned in Vincent of Beauvais's Speculum historiale, who records that a light miraculously shone over his grave. The account of his life in Vincent is the basis for the final section of the Old Icelandic Karlamagnús saga. In the saga, his name is given as Sallinus.

Salvius' feast day is January 11 in the revised Roman Martyrology of 2004, but he is not listed in the General Roman Calendar.
