= Maríu saga =

Maríu saga is an Old Norse-Icelandic biography of the Virgin Mary. Because of the wide range of sources used by its compiler and the way theological commentary has been interspersed with biography, the work is considered "unique within the continental medieval tradition on Mary's life."

The earliest manuscripts of the work are from the second half of the thirteenth century. The saga is anonymous, but has been attributed to Kygri-Björn Hjaltason. This is informed by a reference in Arngrímr Brandsson's version of Guðmundar saga biskups that the cleric Kygri-Björn wrote a Maríu saga. While this does not mean that he was the author of the surviving saga, in the absence of any other medieval life of Mary, Kygri-Björn is the most plausible candidate for authoring the saga.

The text is unusual in the way that it mixes biography with theological commentary. The life of Mary is based on the Gospel of Pseudo-Matthew (Liber de ortu beatae Mariae et infantia salvatoris) and the derived work de nativitate Mariae. It also uses the canonical gospels of Matthew and Luke, the Trinubium Annae (though only in Stock. Perg. 4to 11) and Books 16 and 17 of Flavius Josephus' Antiquitates Judaicae. In addition to these, the text makes use of Old and New Testament authors and Jerome, Gregory the Great, St Augustine and John Chrysostom. Many of its sources have yet to be identified.

Maríu saga was edited in the nineteenth century by Carl Richard Unger. His two volume edition includes numerous stories of miracles attributed to Mary in addition to versions of the saga itself. The manuscript tradition includes texts of the saga alone, texts of the miracles without the saga, and texts with both miracles and saga.

== Bibliography ==
A comprehensive bibliography can be found in Wolf's The Legends of the Saints in Old Norse-Icelandic Prose.

See also Daniel Najork "Reading the Old Norse-Icelandic “Maríu saga” in its Manuscript Contexts" (De Gruyter/MIP 2021).

=== Manuscripts ===
The text of Maríu saga survives in twenty manuscripts. Complete copies of the text are indicated below in bold.

- **AM 232 fol.**
- AM 233a fol.
- **AM 234 fol.**
- AM 235 fol.
- AM 240 fol. I
- AM 240 fol. II
- AM 240 fol. IX
- AM 240 fol. X
- AM 240 fol. XI
- AM 240 fol. XIII
- AM 240 fol. XIV
- **AM 633 4to**
- **AM 634 4to**
- AM 635 4to
- AM 656 4to I
- NRA 78
- NRA 79
- **Stock. Perg. 4to no. 1**
- **Stock. Perg. 4to no. 11**
- Stock. Perg. 8vo no. 5

=== Editions ===
- Ásdís Egilsdóttir; Gunnar Harðarson; Svanhildur Óskarsdóttir, eds. (1996). Maríukver: Sögur og kvæði af heilagri guðsmóður frá fyrri tíð. Reykjavík: Hið Iíslenzka bókmenntafélag. pp. 3–66. ISBN 9789979804802. (Modern Icelandic edition)
- Heizmann, Wilhelm (1993). Das altisländische Marienleben. Vol. 1: Historisch-philologische Studien. Volume 2: Edition der drei Redaktionen nach den Handschriften AM 234 fol, Holm 11 4to und Holm 1 4to. George-August-Universität Göttingen (Habilitationsschrift).
- Unger, C. R., ed. (1871). Mariu saga: Legender om jomfru Maria og hendes jertegn. Vol. 2 volumes. Christiania: Brögger & Christie. (Link is to Vol. 1. Vol. 2 here.)
