= Stjórn =

Old Norse Biblical compilation

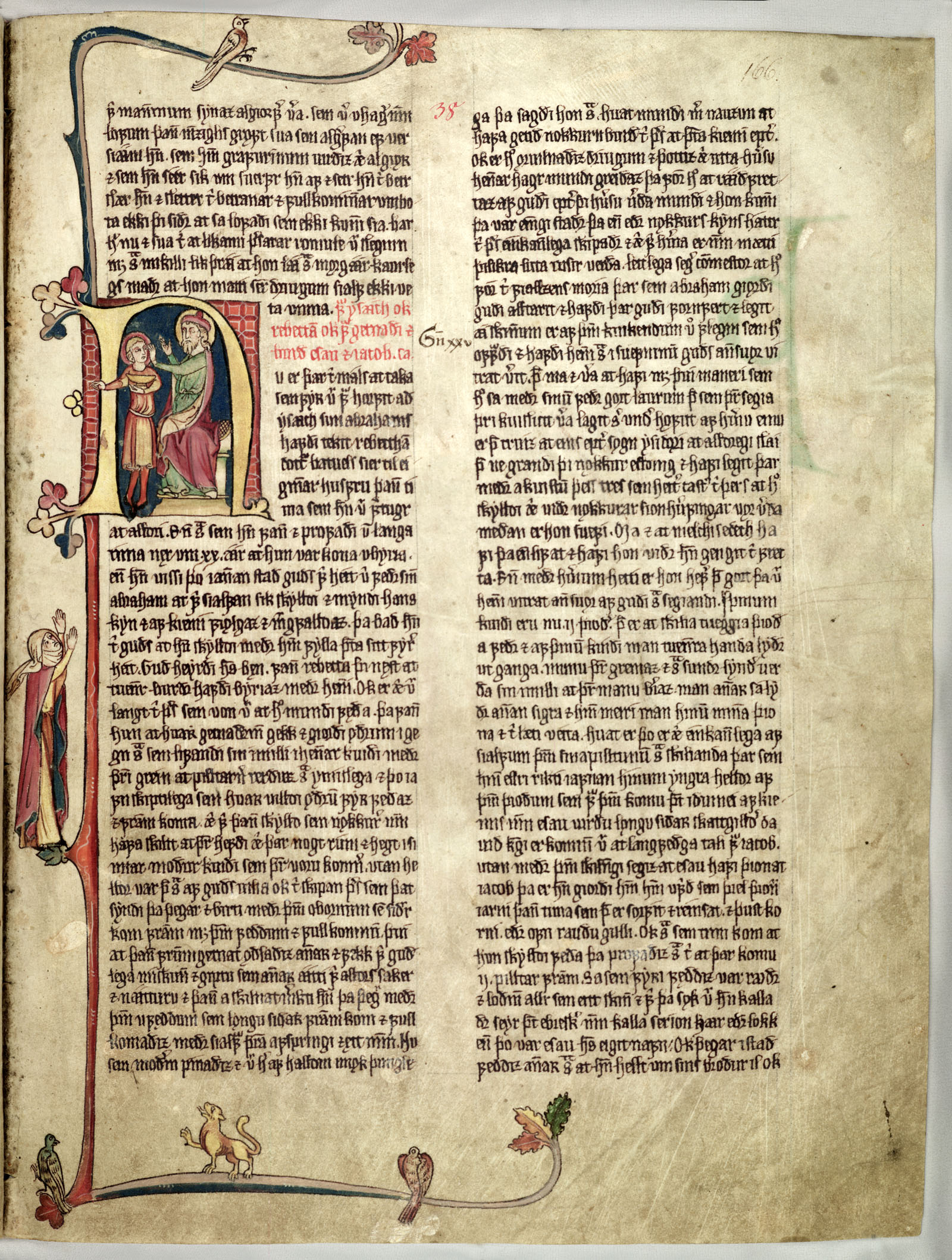
An illuminated page from a 14th century Icelandic copy of Stjórn I. The capital letter marks the beginning of Genesis 25:20.

Stjórn (Icelandic: [stjou(r)tn̥], Old Norse: [stjoːrn]) is the name given to a collection of Old Norse translations of Old Testament historical material dating from the 14th century, which together cover Jewish history from Genesis through to II Kings. Despite the collective title, Stjórn is not a homogeneous work. Rather, it consists of three separate works which vary in date and context, labelled Stjórn I, II and III by scholar I.J. Kirby.

Stjórn I covers Genesis to Exodus 18 with much additional material from Peter Comestor and Vincent Beauvais. Stjórn II completes the Pentateuch; it is based closely on the text of the Vulgate but is significantly abbreviated. Stjórn III treats Joshua to the Exile with some abbreviation and expansion and uses both the Vulgate and Comestor's Historia scholastica as the source of its translation.

These texts were edited under the title Stjórn by C. R. Unger in 1862. This, as well as the existence of many manuscripts which contain the three works, contributed to the perception of Stjórn as a unitary work.

== Title ==
The name Stjórn, which in Old Norse means 'guidance' or 'governance', was first recorded by Árni Magnússon in 1670 in reference to AM folios 226 and 228. He reported that AM 228fol., which was at the farm Hlíðarendi, was called Minnir Stiorn (the minor Stjórn) and AM 226 fol. was called Stærri Stiorn (the major Stjórn). A number of theories have been put forward as to why it should have come to be the title of these works..

Henderson (1818) considered that it referred to the Jewish theocracy, whereas Unger thought that it referred to God's guidance of the Jewish people. However, Astås argues that because Stjórn places very little emphasis on the fact the Jews were the people of God, it is more likely that stjórn refers to “God’s moral upbringing of man.” This is based on the use of the verb stjórna in the preface which refers to God's reign over the world, and that stjórna has moral connotations in 13th century religious texts.

Storm (1886) thought it was a translation of regnum, thus meaning royal history or reign. In a similar vein Jónsson (1923) considered it possible that it was a translation of liber regnum, and thus referring to the books of the Kings in the Vulgate.

Kirby thinks that the title stems from a misreading of uaar konungr. Sa sem stiornar….

== Manuscripts ==
The Stjórn texts are preserved in many manuscripts (Note: The other early manuscript fragments containing Stjórn material are: AM 229 fol., AM 335 qto., AM 617 qto., Stock. Perg. Qto. 36, I., NRA fragm. 60 A-C and Thott 2099 qto.. Kirby (1986) records twenty late paper manuscripts which contain Stjórn or Gyðinga saga texts.) but only three early manuscripts are considered to have independent value: AM 226 fol., AM 227 fol. and AM 228 fol.. Of these only AM 226 fol. contains Stjórn I, II, and III.

The earliest of these manuscripts is AM 228 fol., which is traditionally dated to first quarter of the 14th century; it contains only Stjórn III. AM 227 fol. dated to c. 1350 contains Stjórn I and III. AM 226 fol. originally contained Stjórn I and III, as evidenced by AM 225 fol. which is a copy of AM 226 fol. dating from c. 1440. After AM 225 fol. was copied from it, the gathering in AM 226 fol. containing the end of Stjórn I and beginning of Stjórn III was cut and Stjórn II inserted, written in a much later hand.

AM 226 fol. and many later paper copies also contain, after Stjórn, Rómverja saga, Alexanders saga and Gyðinga saga. Some Stjórn manuscripts are intricately illustrated and AM 227 fol. is a representative example of medieval Icelandic bookmaking.

== History ==
The preface to Stjórn records that king Hákon Magnússon of Norway commissioned a compilation of Biblical material to be read aloud for the benefit of those at his court who could not understand Latin. The veracity of this is, however, uncertain. The compiler states that he makes use of extra-Biblical texts, such as Peter Comestor's Historia scholastica and Vincent of Beauvais's Speculum historiale. However, this can apply only to Stjórn I, as the others do not display the wide-ranging compilation of sources evidenced in Stjórn I.

Nothing certain is known of the history of the Stjórn translations before 1670. However, a “biblia j norænu’’ is mentioned as belonging to the cathedral of Hólar in 1525, which some have argued to be a Stjórn work. A similar, possible sighting of ‘Stjórn’ comes from c. 1580 when Peder Claussøn Friis, vicar of Audnedalen in Norway reports in his Om Iisland that a “well-born Norwegian man, named Erik Brockenhus” had seen an illuminated manuscript containing the Bible in Icelandic, in “around 1567”.

=== Early Critical Reception ===
The first person to inform the European public of Stjórn was Danish bishop Ludvig Harboe in his 1746 Kurze Nachricht von der Isländischen Bibel-Historie.

In 1818 Ebenezer Henderson, a Scottish minister, pointed to the similarities between Stjórn and Konungs Skuggsjá (the King's Mirror), which has been an important aspect in the discussion of Stjórn since.

The first edited publication was by Unger in 1862 as Stjorn: Gammelnorsk Bibelhistorie; he attempted to provide a text as close to that used by the original compiler as possible.

In 1866 Keyser questioned the authenticity of a note in AM 226 fol. which suggested that the Icelandic abbot Brandr Jónsson was the author of Stjórn. This paved the way for arguments for a Norwegian provenance of the work: a topic which was hotly debated.

== Contents ==
=== Stjórn I ===
Stjórn I covers the Pentateuch material from Genesis to Exodus 18 and is considered by Kirby to be the youngest of the three sections. It is not a simple translation of the relevant Biblical texts, but rather a compilation based on the Bible which is augmented with information from various sources, principally from Vincent of Beauvis and Comestor's Historica scholastica. The additional material is either in the form of commentaries on the Biblical text or as discrete information. The latter is mainly derived from Vincent of Beavis, including a treatise on geography, tales of the legendary love affairs of Joseph and Moses. Additionally, there are also two homilies on Lent.

There are a number of similarities of vocabulary and style between Stjórn I and Stjórn III. Kirby accounts for this by stating that the author of Stjórn I translated from the above-mentioned sources, but made reference to the text of Stjórn III while doing so.

=== Stjórn II ===
Stjórn II completes the Pentateuch and is considered by Kirby to be the earliest of the three sections. It is different in style from Stjórn I and III in that it is translated from the Vulgate with very little additional material. Although it closely follows the text of the Vulgate, it omits significant sections, many of which concern information mentioned earlier in the text.

The text of Stjórn II in AM 226 fol. is a copy of an earlier version, as can be seen from a number of scribal features. Seip (1952) argues that the AM 226 fol text is a copy of a Norwegian text dating to the late 14th century. Kirby believes that the scribe was copying an Icelandic exemplar dating to no later than the first quarter of the 13th century.

=== Stjórn III ===
Stjórn III covers the Biblical text from Joshua to the end of II Kings, although it uses information from the books of Chronicles to augment the text. Kirby thinks it likely that this text was composed by Brandr Jónsson, the translator of Gyðinga saga.

The text closely follows the Vulgate text with omission and summary like Stjórn II, but unlike that section makes considerable use of extra-Biblical material, though not to the same extent as Stjórn I.

The relationship between Stjórn III and Konungs Skuggsjá has been noted since 1818. It has traditionally been assumed that Konungs Skuggsjá borrowed from Stjórn III. That the opposite was true has been argued by Hofmann (1973) and Bagge (1979); Kirby (1986) argues in favour of the traditional view in his study Bible Translation in Old Norse.
