= Peter Foote =

Scandinavian Studies professor (1924–2009)

Professor Peter Foote
- Born: 26 May 1924; Swanage, Dorset, England
- Died: 29 September 2009 (aged 85)
- Spouse: Eleanor McCaig (m. 1951; died 2006)
- Children: 3

Academic background
- Education: University College of the South West of England; University of London; University of Oslo
- Academic advisor: Anne Holtsmark

Academic work
- Discipline: Old Norse literature
- Institutions: University College London
- Military career
- Allegiance: United Kingdom
- Branch: Royal Navy
- Service years: 1943–1946
- Conflicts: World War II

Peter Godfrey Foote (26 May 1924 – 29 September 2009) was a scholar of Old Norse literature and Scandinavian studies. He inaugurated the Department of Scandinavian Studies at University College London, and headed it for 20 years.

== Early life and education ==
Foote was born and raised in Swanage, Dorset, the fourth of five sons of a butcher. His two eldest brothers had to leave school at 14; he and the other younger boys were able to attend grammar school. In 1942 he entered University College of the South West of England (now Exeter University) on a scholarship.

His studies were interrupted in 1943 by service in the Royal Navy, mostly in the Far East.

Upon demobilisation, Foote resumed his university studies at the start of 1947 and in 1948 earned a University of London external BA with first class honours. In 1948-49 he studied at the University of Oslo on a Norwegian government research studentship, where he was moulded by studying under Anne Holtsmark, Following that, he began postgraduate studies in the Department of English at University College, London, receiving an MA in 1951.

== Academic career ==
He had already been appointed a teaching assistant and then assistant lecturer in Old Icelandic within the Department of Scandinavian Studies, which at the time was still part of the Department of English. Over the next 13 years he advanced to reader in Old Scandinavian and then in 1963 to professor of Scandinavian Studies, with the separation of the field from English as a new department.

Together with Hugh Smith, director of University College's Department of English and Scandinavian Studies in the 1950s, Foote saw the wisdom of studying Old Norse literature and culture in association with the modern Scandinavian languages and the history of all the Scandinavian countries. In his inaugural lecture in 1964, on Færeyinga saga, Foote looked forward in this spirit to the college teaching modern Icelandic and Faroese, and treating Scandinavian history as a unified field. He said then: "Old Scandinavian . . . confers a welcome freedom, so that I may with perfect propriety offer a lecture on an Icelandic text concerning Atlantic islanders of Norwegian origin whose descendants have now for some centuries technically owed allegiance to the Danish crown".

Foote expanded the new department during his tenure, adding first a full-time position in Scandinavian philology (1964), then another in Norse studies (1965), classes in Faroese (1968), then a teaching assistantship in modern Icelandic (1970s), and finally after considerable effort a lectureship in Nordic history (1970). He continued to teach occasionally at University College until 2006, more than twenty years after retiring.

He was also very active in the Viking Society for Northern Research, editing Saga-Book, its journal, from 1952 to 1976 and serving twice as president (1974–76 and 1990–92) among other positions.

He received honorary doctorates from the University of Iceland and the University of Uppsala and national honours from Denmark, Iceland, Norway and Sweden. He was a fellow of the Norwegian Academy of Science and Letters from 1986.

== Publications ==
Foote was greatly respected for the quality of his translations, which included Gunnlaugs saga ormstungu (1957) and together with others, the ancient Icelandic law book Grágás (Laws of Early Iceland, 1980 and 2000). He co-wrote The Viking Achievement (1960) with David M. Wilson. After he retired he produced a three-volume edited translation, the first English edition, of Olaus Magnus's 16th-century Latin Description of the Northern Peoples (1996–98) and edited Jóns saga helga (2003).

== Personal life ==
In 1951 Foote married Eleanor McCaig, from the Stranraer region, whom he had met in the Far East during World War II when she was a nurse. She died in 2006. They had two daughters and a son. He enjoyed walking and bell-ringing, and participated until 2008 in a reading group that took its name, the Orðhenglar ("Pedants"), from his insistence on correct Icelandic.
