= Carl Richard Unger =

Norwegian philologist (1817–1897)

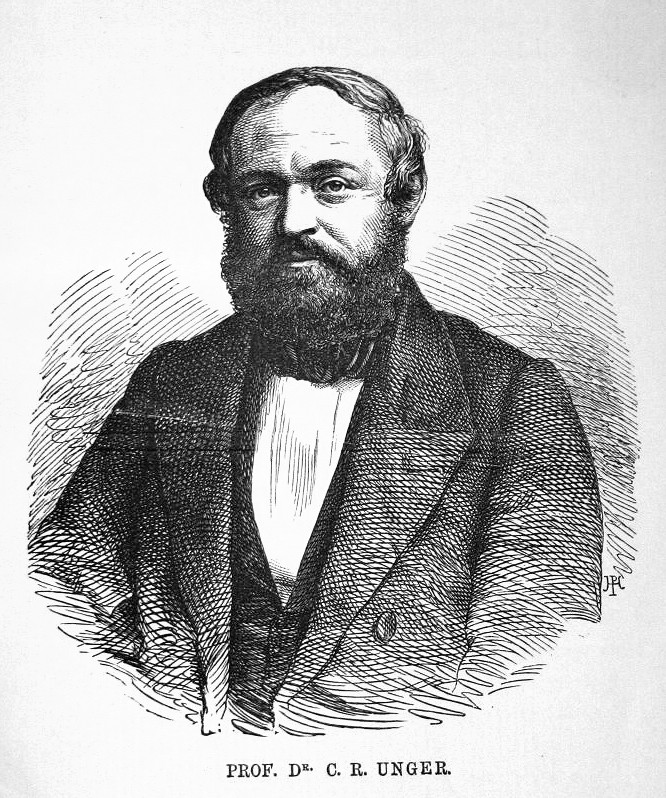
- Born: 2 July 1817; Christiania, Norway
- Died: 30 November 1897 (aged 80); Christiania, Norway

Academic work
- Discipline: Germanic studies
- Sub-discipline: Old Norse studies
- Institutions: Royal Frederick University
- Main interests: Old Norse literature

Carl Richard Unger (2 July 1817 – 30 November 1897) was a Norwegian historian and philologist. Unger was professor of Germanic and Romance philology at the University of Christiania from 1862 and was a prolific editor of Old Norse texts.

== Early life ==
Unger was born in Christiania, now Oslo, to Johan Carl Jonassen Unger and Annemarie Wetlesen. Between 1830 and 1832 he lived in Telemark with the poet and priest Simon Olaus Wolff. He graduated from school in 1835.

== Academic career ==
Unger studied philology after school but did not receive a degree as mathematics, a subject with which he struggled, was compulsory for philologists. However, in 1841 he was awarded a scholarship to continue studying Old Norse, Old English and Old German.

In 1845 Unger began lecturing on Old Norse at the University of Christiana. He was appointed lecturer of Germanic and Romance philology in 1851 and became professor in 1862.

== Edited works ==
- 1847: Fagrskinna (with P. A. Munch)
- 1847-: Diplomatarium Norvegicum
- 1848: Alexanders saga
- 1848: Konungs skuggsjá (with Rudolf Keyser and P. A. Munch)
- 1849: Olafs Saga hins helga (with Rudolf Keyser)
- 1850: Strengleikar (with Rudolf Keyser)
- 1851: Barlaams ok Josaphats Saga
- 1853: Saga þiðriks konungs af Bern
- 1853: Saga Olafs konungs ens helga (with P. A. Munch)
- 1860: Karlamagnus Saga ok kappa hans
- 1860-68: Flateyjarbók, 3 volumes (with Guðbrandur Vigfússon)
- 1862: Stjórn
- 1864: Gammel norsk Homiliebog
- 1867: Morkinskinna
- 1868: Heimskringla
- 1869: Thomas saga erkibyskups
- 1871: Mariu saga
- 1871: Codex Frisianus
- 1873: Konunga sögur
- 1874: Postola sögur
- 1877: Heilagra manna sögur, 2 volumes

== See also ==
- Peter Andreas Munch
- Sophus Bugge
- Magnus Olsen
