= Breta sögur =

Old Norse-Icelandic rendering of Historia regum Britanniae

Breta sögur (Sagas of the Britons) is an Old Norse-Icelandic rendering of Geoffrey of Monmouth's Historia regum Britanniae with some additional material from other sources. Breta sögur begins with a summary of the story of Aeneas and Turnus, derived from the Aeneid. Along with Rómverja saga, Veraldar saga and Trójumanna saga, it represents the earliest phase of translation of secular works into Old Norse-Icelandic.

== Versions and manuscripts ==
Breta sögur survives in two recensions: a longer but poorly preserved version in AM 573 4to and a shorter, abridged version in Hauksbók (AM 544 4to). Both recensions of Breta sögur are based on an earlier translation. Because of the poor preservation of these texts and the absence of the original Latin exemplar, it is hard to trace the development of the Breta sögur from Latin to Old Norse-Icelandic. Because the author of Skjöldunga saga was familiar with the Historia Regum Britanniae, a version of the Latin text must have been available in Iceland by the end of the 12th century. However, Kalinke argues that AM 573 4to shows that a variant version of Geoffrey of Monmouth's text was used, one which was closer to romance than chronicle. In both versions, Breta sögur comes after the B-version of Trójumanna saga, the Old Norse-Icelandic translation of Dares Phrygius's de excidio Trojae historia.

The Hauksbók version of Breta sögur contains the only extant copy of Gunnlaugr Leifsson's Merlínússpá, a translation of Geoffrey of Monmouth's Prophetiae Merlini. It is likely, though not proven, that Gunnlaugr was also responsible for translating Breta sögur. If not translated by Gunnlaugr himself, it is equally possible that it was translated by another monk at Thingeyrar Monastery.

The longer version of the text represented in AM 573 4to is also evidenced in a 17th-century paper copy (Stock. Papp. fol. no. 58) of the lost Ormsbók. However, this copy is incomplete and finishes before the Arthurian material begins. Sections from this longer version were incorporated into the universal history section of Reynistaðarbók (AM 764 4to), copied either from AM 573 4to or from a manuscript closely linked to it. In 1968 a fragment of a version of the saga was found in the binding of an Icelandic manuscript in Trinity College Dublin.

=== Full list of manuscripts ===
Kalinke and Mitchell identified the following manuscripts of the saga:

BL Add 24,969 fol (ca 1731)
JS 209 4to (ca 1760)
Lbs 678 4to (ca 1852–54)
AM 176 a fol (late 17th c)
AM 176 b fol (late 17th c)
AM 281 4to (late 17th c)
AM 544 4to "Hauksbok" (early 14th c), vellum
AM 573 4to (14th c), vellum
AM 597 b 4to (2nd half 17th c)
Houghton Library, Harvard University: Harvard MS Icelandic 34 4to (1805)
IB 271 4to (ca 1800)
JS 638 4to (17th-19th c)
Kall 247 fol (late 18th c)
Lbs 4613 4to (ca 1700)
National Archives, Stockholm: Säfstaholmssamlingen I Papp 7 (18th c)
NKS 1148 fol (late 18th c)
NKS 1151 fol (late 18th c)
NKS 1171 fol (late 18th c)
NKS 1723 4to (late 18th c)
NKS 445 8vo (1869)
Papp fol nr 58 (1690)
Rask 29 (2nd half of the 18th c)
Trinity College, Dublin: L.2.18 fol (18th c)
Trinity College, Dublin: L.3.18 8vo (18th c)
