= Veraldar saga =

Old Norse-Icelandic work of universal history

Veraldar saga (The Saga of the World) is an Old Norse-Icelandic work of universal history written in its earliest form some time in the twelfth century. It was first called Veraldar saga by Konráð Gíslason in his 1860 edition of the text.

Veraldar saga follows the common medieval practice of dividing the world into six ages. However, it is unlike twelfth century European historiography for being written entirely in the vernacular, without any interpolated poetry, and for giving no attention to the area of the world where it was composed, instead focusing on the Holy Roman Empire. Cross notes that it instead has more in common with European works from the fourteenth and fifteenth centuries.

== Summary ==
Veraldar saga is a history of the world from Creation to the twelfth century. In most versions, the saga switches to the present tense to when it reaches its final sentence which says that Frederick I Barbarossa is Holy Roman Emperor. This suggests that it was written sometime during Frederick's reign from 1155 to 1190.

The six ages are as follows:

1. Creation of the world to the construction of Noah's Ark.
2. Noah entering the Ark to the life of Terah, Abraham's father.
3. The life of Abraham to the reign of King Saul.
4. The reign of King David to the life of Elisha, foster-son of Elijah.
5. The Babylonian Captivity to the reign of Emperor Augustus.
6. The birth of Christ to the reign of Emperor Frederick I, though the sixth age was envisioned to last until Judgement Day.

The text uses little direct speech and other than occasional alliteration, very few rhetorical devices are used. Würth summarises the text as "a dry and linear report which confines itself to listing the events."

== Background ==
Historiography was common in medieval Iceland, and as Würth notes, it can be difficult to separate historiography as an independent genre in Old Norse-Icelandic, as all Old Norse-Icelandic literature as a whole shows an interest in history.

However, there is a class of texts known as pseudo-histories that overlaps in some respects with the content of Veraldar saga. These are loose translations and reworkings of Latin texts which deal with the history of peoples outside medieval Scandinavia. The five texts are Trójumanna saga, Rómverja saga, Breta sögur, Alexanders saga, and Gyðinga saga.

Veraldar saga differs from these texts in being a full universal history. Würth notes that Veraldar saga sits on the border between translation and original vernacular composition. It is not a compilation of translations of Latin works, but a gathering of a number of different sources which may have been a mix of texts written Old Norse-Icelandic and Latin.

While other universal histories were written in Iceland, they are considerably later than Veraldar saga. Reynistaðarbók (AM 764 4to) was written c. 1360-1380 and Heimsaldrar in the manuscript AM 194 8vo. dates to 1387.

Heimsaldrar in AM 194 8vo. uses the same six ages as Veraldar saga whereas Reynistaðarbók organised them as follows: Adam - Noah - Moses - David - Christ. Benediktsson considers Heimsaldrar to be a variant of Veraldar saga rather than an independent work.

== Manuscripts and versions ==
Veraldar saga is represented in eleven manuscripts and fragments, representing two main redactions, labelled A and B by Jakob Benediktsson.

Version B exists in early fragments, but it survives in full only in copies from 1600 and later. Unlike A, this version of the text contains allegorical notes on each of the first five ages. Benediktsson considers these to be original features which were omitted from version A.

Version A includes additional material including an account of the four synods in Nicea, Constantinople, Ephesus and Chalcedon; a section on the patriarchs; and an incomplete list of popes.

== Sources and parallels ==
Veraldar saga shares with Bede and Isidore's work the six ages, but there is little direct link between the saga and these authors. There are however closer parallels with the Historia Scholastica.

There are close parallels between sections of Veraldar saga and Rómverja saga. Hofmann proposed that Veraldar saga takes its Roman history from Rómverja saga. Þorbjörg Helgadóttir instead considers that the two sagas both used the same Latin sources: Sallust and Lucan.

== Bibliography ==
=== Manuscripts ===
==== Veraldar saga A ====
- AM 625 4to
- Stock. Perg. 8to no. 5
- AM 766c 4to
- NKS 147 fol
- Lbs. 776 4to

==== Veraldar saga B ====
- AM 655 VII 4to
- AM 626 4to
- Stock. Perg. 4to no. 9
- AM 766 a 4to
- AM 731 4to

==== Veraldar saga C ====
- AM 655 VIII 4to

=== Editions ===
- Gíslason, Konráð (1860). Fire og fyrretyve for en stor Deel forhen utrykte Prøver af oldnordisk Sprog og Litteratur. Copenhagen: Gyldendal. pp. 64–107. Edition of the A version
- Morgenstern, Gustav (1983). Arnamagnæanische Fragmente: Ein Supplement zu den Heilagra Manna Sögur. Leipzig and Copenhagen: Graf. pp. 35–44. Edition of the oldest fragments
- Benediktsson, Jakob (1944). Veraldar saga. Samfund til udgivelse af gammel nordisk litteratur 61. Copenhagen: Luno.

=== Translations ===
- Cross, James Andrew (2012). The World's Saga: An English Translation of the Old Norse Veraldar saga, a History of the World in Six Ages (Thesis). Háskóli Íslands (MA thesis). pp. 1–34. hdl:1946/12777.
- Benediktsson, Jakob (1988). "Veraldar saga". In Thorsson, Örnólfur (ed.). Sturlunga saga: Skýringar og fræði (in Icelandic). Reykjavík: Svart á Hvítu. pp. 15–47.
