= Algorismus =

Algorismus may refer to:

- Algorismus (Norse text), a section of Hauksbók
- Algorism, 13th century Latin writings on numerical calculation methods using the newly introduced Hindu-Arabic numerals, eventually replacing the older Roman numerals centuries later

== See also ==
- Al-Khwārizmī, a Persian mathematician who wrote an Arabic book on Algorism centuries before the Hindu-Arabic number system became known in Europe. Latin authors began to read his name as ALGOR, which led to the word Algorismus as used by Latin authors in Europe
- Algorithm (disambiguation)
