= Merlínússpá =

Old Norse-Icelandic verse translation of Prophetiae Merlini

Merlínússpá (Prophecy of Merlin) is an Old Norse-Icelandic verse translation of Prophetiae Merlini in Geoffrey of Monmouth's Historia regum Britanniae. It is notable for being the only translation of a foreign prose text into poetry in Old Norse-Icelandic literature and for being the earliest Arthurian text to have been translated in medieval Scandinavia. Merlínússpá is preserved in two consecutive parts preserved in the Hauksbók (AM 544 4to) version of Breta sögur. In both Hauksbók and the version of Breta sögur preserved in the manuscript AM 573 4to, the poems are attributed to Gunnlaugr Leifsson. The poem is omitted in AM 573 4to, with the scribe noting that "many people know that poem". Gunnlaugr Leifsson wrote Merlínússpá around 1200. It is a close translation of the Prophetiae Merlini but also includes material from the Historia regum Britanniae.

Merlínússpá is written in fornyrðislag verse form, which is also used in the prophetic poems Völuspá and Völuspá hin skamma. Although it is a close translation of its Latin exemplar, Merlínússpá uses imagery from Old Norse-Icelandic prose, which together with its meter give it "the semblance of an Eddic poem."
