= Raman Mehrzad =

Raman Mehrzad is a Swedish author and creator of the mobile application (app) entitled Straight A's'.

== Books ==
- MVG i allt - Hemligheterna med att få högsta betyg i skolan ("Straight As - the secrets of getting top grades in school")

At age 21 Mehrzad authored his first book entailed: MVG i allt – Hemligheterna med att få högsta betyg i skolan. This book (ISBN 978-613-3-44759-2) provides advice and study techniques for students The book was released in December 2007 and almost 10,000 copies were sold in its first week. Mehrzad was featured in the news on Swedish national television as well as daily newspapers. He began giving lectures in primary and high schools around Sweden

- Doktorns recept på ett yngre och friskare liv ("The doctor's prescription for a younger and healthier life")

Mehrzad' second book Doktorns recept på ett yngre och friskare liv (The Doctor's Prescriptions for a Younger and Healthier Life) was released in October 2009 (ISBN 978-91-977428-7-0). Mehrzad, together with the plastic surgeon Elisabet Gudmundsdottir, discuss various aspects of improving one's health and looks.

- Från förort till framgång ("From suburb to success")

Mehrzad contributed to the book "Från förort till framgång"("From suburb to success") which was released in February 2011 (ISBN 9185379409). Mehrzad, together with 25 other entrepreneurs in Sweden collected their biographies into an anthology and released the book as a "pro bono" project.

- A i alla ämnen - Den ultimata guiden till högsta betyg ("A in all subjects - The ultimate guide to the highest grades")

In 2011, Sweden changed its grading system (IG-MVG) to the international system, A-F. Mehrzad was offered a publishing deal with Bonnier Fakta, to release an updated and revised form of his first book, "MVG i allt - Hemligheterna med att få högsta betyg i skolan". The book was released in August 2012 (ISBN 9789175034430) and became the top of Sweden's best-seller list. Mehrzad was in daily newspapers and on Swedish national television, Channel 4 (TV4 Nyhetsmorgon).

== Mobile Application ==
- Straight A's / A i alla ämnen

Mehrzad is the creator 'Straight A's' (Swedish title: 'A i alla ämnen'). The app was released in December 2013 and is the first mobile app personal study coach. The app has an algorithmic input function where the user can input their strengths and weaknesses in different categories. The app tailors study plans for the individual.
