= De Excidio =

De Excidio ("Concerning the Destruction") is a Latin title that may refer to:

- De excidio et conquestu Britanniae ("On the Ruin & Conquest of Britain") by Gildas
- De excidio Troiae ("On the Destruction of Troy") by "Dares the Phrygian"
