= Gunnlaugr Leifsson =

Icelandic scholar, author and poet

- Died: 1218 or 1219
- Citizenship: Icelandic
- Occupations: Scholar, author, poet

Gunnlaugr Leifsson (died 1218 or 1219) was an Icelandic scholar, author and poet. He was a Benedictine monk at the Þingeyraklaustur monastery (Icelandic Þingeyrarklaustur) in the north of Iceland. Many sources (including Þorvalds þáttur víðförla) refer to him simply as Gunnlaugr munkr or Gunnlaugr the Monk.

== Biography ==
Little is known about Gunnlaugr's family or life, but a miracle in Jóns saga helga hin elsta describes how Gunnlaugr the Monk's "disciple and relative" Leifr recovers from a dangerous illness after drinking holy water touched by the relics of Bishop Jón Ögmundarson of Hólar. The miracle is dated to the episcopy of Guðmundur Arason of Hólar (between 1203 and 1237).

Gunnlaugr composed a Latin biography of King Óláfr Tryggvason (see Óláfs saga Tryggvasonar). This work is now lost but it is believed to have been an expansion of the Latin Óláfs saga Tryggvasonar written by his monastic brother, Oddr Snorrason. Snorri Sturluson made use of Gunnlaugr's work when composing his Heimskringla and sections of Gunnlaugr's work were incorporated into Óláfs saga Tryggvasonar en mesta.

Gunnlaugr also wrote a Latin vita of Bishop Jón Ögmundarson. This work is also lost but Old Norse sagas of Jón of Hólar are still extant. Gunnlaugr also composed the original Latin version of Þorvalds þáttr víðförla but it is only preserved in an Old Norse translation. Gunnlaugr was also involved in the collection of Þorlákr helgi's miracles. According to several medieval sources, Gunnlaugr composed a work on Saint Ambrose. One study hypothesizes that the extant Old Norse translation of Vita sancti Ambrosii, Ambrósíus saga, may be Gunnlaugr's work, although Gunnlaugr's nova historia sancti Ambrosii is generally identified as a Latin office of St Ambrose, Ambrósíustíðir.

Gunnlaugr is likewise credited with the poem Merlínússpá, a Norse translation of Prophetiae Merlini by Geoffrey of Monmouth. The imagery in Gunnlaugr's translation testifies to his extensive knowledge of skaldic poetry. The poem is preserved in Hauksbók and consists of a total of 171 fornyrðislag stanzas.

== See also ==
- Karl Jónsson

== Other sources ==
- Eysteinn Björnsson (2002). Index of Old Norse/Icelandic Skaldic Poetry. Published online at: https://web.archive.org/web/20060923215712/http://www.hi.is/~eybjorn/ugm/skindex/skindex.html See in particular "Gunnlaugr Leifsson" at https://web.archive.org/web/20070311082236/http://www.hi.is/~eybjorn/ugm/skindex/gleifs.html from the editions of Finnur Jónsson and E. A. Kock.
- Gottskálk Jensson (2012). "*Revelaciones Thorlaci Episcopi – Enn eitt glatað latínurit eftir Gunnlaug Leifsson munk á Þingeyrum" in Gripla 23:133–175.
- Guðrún Nordal (2001). Tools of Literacy : The Role of Skaldic Verse in Icelandic Textual Culture of the Twelfth and Thirteenth Centuries. University of Toronto Press. ISBN 0-8020-4789-0 pp. 168–169.
- Katrín Axelsdóttir (2005). "Gunnlaugur Leifsson og Ambrósíus saga" in Skírnir, Autumn 2005:337-349. ISSN 0256-8446
- Oddr Snorrason (translated by Theodore M. Andersson) (2003). The Saga of Olaf Tryggvason. Cornell University Press. ISBN 0-8014-4149-8
- Simpson, Jacqueline (2004). "Olaf Tryggvason versus the Powers of Darkness" in The Witch Figure: Folklore Essays by a Group of Scholars in England, pp. 165–187. Routledge. ISBN 0-415-33074-2
