= Mótsognir =

First of the dwarves in Norse mythology

In Norse mythology, Mótsognir (Old Norse: [ˈmoːtˌsoɣnez̠], "he who drinks in might"), also found as Móðsognir ([ˈmoːðˌsoɣnez̠]; Hauksbók manuscript variant), "he who drinks in courage", is the ruler of the dwarves. In Völuspà 10, he is identified as mæztr um orðinn dverga allra, "lord of all the dwarves". According to Snorri Sturluson in Gylfaginning 14, which seeks to explain this verse, "the dwarfs had taken shape first and acquired life in the flesh of Ymir and were then maggots, but by decision of the gods they became conscious with intelligence and had the shape of men though they live in the earth and in rocks. Modsognir was a dwarf and the second was Durinn."

== Origin ==
According to Völuspà 9, the dwarfs were created by ginnheilög goð, "the high holy gods", who resolved to fashion them "out of Brimir's blood and Blainn's bones," a phrase typically interpreted to mean the blood and flesh of the primordial giant, Ymir. This is based on the mythic fact that Ymir was slain and his corpse was used to fashion the earth and heaven, as told in Grímnismál 40-41 from the Poetic Edda and Snorri's account in Gylfaginning 8.

In scholarship, the interpretation of Völuspà 9–10 in Snorri's Prose Edda, (Gylfaginning 14), is disputed, primarily because his text of the verse varies from that found in independent manuscripts of the poem. The original text in the Codex Regius and Hauksbók manuscripts, appear to refer to how the dwarfs together gave shape to human beings (manlíkon), which are then brought to life by Odin and his brothers in the verses following the so-called Dvergatal (Völuspá v. 9–16), which is commonly seen as an interpolation into the text. Sigurd Nordal observed that "Sophus Bugge read the second half of verse 10 as "these dwarfs made many manikins in the earth, as Durinn said", noting "this appears to assume Modsognir and Durin shape the dwarfs, but only as manikins (i.e. dead images of men) and that the Æsir then gave them life." Nordal concludes that "Snorri's narrative is similar, but it was probably only his interpretation of the stanza as he knew it (cf. textual variants)". Ursula Dronke summarizes this view, stating "Snorri omits, therefore 10/1-4, which tells of the creating of the dwarfs by the two master dwarfs, and alters the lines 'they created many man-shaped figures out of the earth' to 'many man-shaped figures formed themselves out of the earth.' When 9/5 is cited in Snorri's Edda, it too has to be changed. The gods must not consider 'who' (hverr) should create the dwarfs, as this does not fit their maggot-like origins. Instead, ...they simply consider 'that' (at in place of hverr) the dwarfs should be created."

Additional scholarly etymologies of the name Módsognir suggest a derivation from ON móðr and súga, perhaps related to Swedish modsugen, "apathetic", rendering the meaning "the tried sigher"; "moth sucker" has also been suggested, however unlikely this may seem. Lotte Motz offered the reading "furious sucker". Sveinbjörn Egilsson, in the first edition of Lexicon Poeticum (1860), interpreted the name to mean Mjóðsognir, the "mead-sucker", compare Mjóðvitnir, "the mead-wolf" in Völuspà 11.

== Modern influence ==
Mótsog the Dwarf appears in The Lord of the Rings Online video game, following J. R. R. Tolkien's tradition of using names from Völuspá for Middle-earth Dwarves. As in Tolkien's legendarium Durin was the first of the Dwarves, Mótsog is re-imagined as the second dwarf of Durin's clan, inverting their order from the Norse mythology. Mótsognir's Call appears in God of War Ragnarök as a relic weapon.
