= Algorithmic =

Algorithmic may refer to:

- Algorithm, step-by-step instructions for a calculation
  - Algorithmic art, art made by an algorithm
  - Algorithmic composition, music made by an algorithm
  - Algorithmic trading, trading decisions made by an algorithm
  - Algorithmic patent, an intellectual property right in an algorithm
  - Algorithmic, a software engineering and design studio based in London, UK
- Algorithmics, the science of algorithms
  - Algorithmica, an academic journal for algorithm research
  - Algorithmic efficiency, the computational resources used by an algorithm
  - Algorithmic information theory, study of relationships between computation and information
  - Algorithmic mechanism design, the design of economic systems from an algorithmic point of view
  - Algorithmic number theory, algorithms for number-theoretic computation
  - Algorithmic game theory, game-theoretic techniques for algorithm design and analysis
- Algorithmic cooling, a phenomenon in quantum computation
- Algorithmic probability, a universal choice of prior probabilities in Solomonoff's theory of inductive inference

== See also ==
- Algorithmic complexity (disambiguation)
