= Reynistaðarbók =

14th-century Icelandic manuscript

Reynistaðarbók (AM 764 4to) is a 14th-century Icelandic manuscript. It is formed of two main parts, the first of which is a universal history; the second is a collection of saints' sagas, miracles, exempla and annals for the years 1328–1372. It is notable for preserving the only known Old Norse-Icelandic translation of the Book of Judith. It also contains the miracles of St Walburga and the last few lines of a miracle of St Sunniva which do not appear in any other Icelandic manuscripts.

The texts in the manuscript are drawn from a range of Old Norse-Icelandic translations of Latin works which are heavily abridged. Svanhildur Óskarsdóttir suggests that "the almost relentless emphasis on brevitas" implies that the work was intended for the schoolroom rather than to be read aloud. She also suggests that the focus on Old Testament heroines implies that the work was created as a 'woman's book', suitable for the nuns that would be reading it.

== History ==
Paleographic and codicological evidence suggests that the manuscript was produced in Skagafjörður in northern Iceland around 1360–1380, probably at the Benedictine nunnery at Reynistaðar. Because of this, Svanhildur Óskarsdóttir has named the manuscript Reynistaðarbók.

The manuscript was collected by Árni Magnússon from the farm of Gaulverjabær in southern Iceland. It was previously held at the episcopal see at Skálholt. Árni Magnússon acquired folio 38 separately; he took folios 39–43 from a codex of annals at Skálolt; and two further leaves (probably folios 27–28) came from Gaulverjabær via Rev. Daði Halldórsson in Steinsholt.

== Contents ==
Reynistaðarbók is formed of two sections: a universal history; and a collection of saints' sagas, miracles, exempla and annals. The universal history takes up the first part of the book, ending on line 4 of folio 23v. Like Veraldar saga and Heimsaldrar in AM 194 8vo this is organised by ages of the world (aetates mundi). Whereas Veraldar saga and Heimsaldrar uses six ages, Reynistaðarbók uses eight:

1. Adam to Lamech
2. Noah and the Flood; the Tower of babel
3. Abraham to Amram
4. Moses to Saul
5. David to Augustus
6. Christ to Antichrist
7. Hell, purgatory and refrigerium sanctorum
8. Judgement Day and celestial bliss

The scribes used a large number of existing Old Norse-Icelandic translations of Latin works, including the following: Stjórn III; Gyðinga saga; Breta sögur; Augustinus saga; Gregorius saga; Guðmundar saga biskups; Mǫrtu saga ok Maríu Magðalenu; Martinus saga; Nikuláss saga erkibiskups; Tveggja postola saga Jóns ok Jakobs; and Vitae patrum.

A complete, annotated description of the manuscript's contents can be found in Svanhildur Óskarsdóttir's doctoral thesis.

== Description ==
The manuscript contains 43 leaves with five inserted slips; the two leaves catalogued as AM 162 M fol. were also likely to have originally belonged to the manuscript. Because it has not survived intact, and because of lacunae in the second part of the manuscript, it is impossible to tell how long it originally was. It is also hard to tell if the manuscript's leaves are bound in their original order.

The manuscript is the work of at least ten scribes, seven of whom were responsible for the first section of the work. The largest leaf measures 26 by 16.6 cm. The text is written across the page; the number of lines on a page is between 36 and 48, with 41 being the most common.
