= Landnámabók =

Medieval Icelandic written work

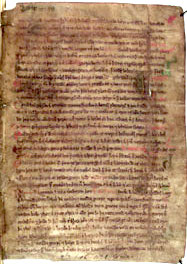
A page from a vellum manuscript of Landnáma in the Árni Magnússon Institute for Icelandic Studies in Reykjavík, Iceland

Landnámabók (Icelandic pronunciation: [ˈlantˌnauːmaˌpouːk], Old Norse pronunciation: [ˈlandˌnamaˌboːk], "Book of Settlements"), often shortened to Landnáma, is a medieval Icelandic written work which describes in considerable detail the settlement (landnám) of Iceland by the Norse in the 9th and 10th centuries AD.

== Landnáma ==
Landnámabók is divided into five parts and 102 chapters.

The first part tells of how the island was found, and the first settlers that came to the land. The latter parts count settlers quarter by quarter, beginning with west and ending with south. It traces important events and family history into the 12th century: more than 3,000 people and 1,400 settlements are described. It tells where each settler settled and provides a brief genealogy of his or her descendants. Sometimes short anecdote-like stories are also included. Landnámabók lists 435 people (landnámsmenn, which includes men and women) as the initial settlers, the majority of them settling in the northern and southwestern parts of the island.

It remains an invaluable source on both the history and genealogy of the Icelandic people. Some have suggested a single author, while others have believed it to have been put together when people met at things (assemblies).

== Versions ==
Ari Þorgilsson may have written the earliest version of Landnámabók in addition to his shorter Íslendingabók; or early versions may have been based on the genealogies that Ari states he left out of Íslendingabók. The oldest surviving versions were written in the 13th and 14th centuries. The initial settlement of Iceland largely took place during the Viking Age between 870 and 930, but Landnámabók mentions descendants significantly later than the actual settlement period, at least into the 11th century.

Five versions of Landnámabók survive, of which three were written in the Middle Ages, the other two in the 17th century preserving medieval material:

- Sturlubók by Sturla Þórðarson, thought to have been written between 1275 and 1280
- A version in the early 14th-century compilation Hauksbók by Haukr Erlendsson, who says he based it on Sturlubók and a lost 13th-century version by Styrmir Kárason, Styrmisbók
- Melabók, written c. 1300, of which only two sheets survive; genealogies were appended to this in the early 14th century
- Skarðsárbók, compiled prior to 1636 by Björn Jónsson of Skarðsá from Sturlubók and Hauksbók
- Þórðarbók, compiled in the 17th century by Þórður Jónsson from Skarðsárbók with the addition of sections of Melabók, some of which may derive from Styrmisbók

Landnámabók is one of the main sources of information on the heathen religion of the settlers. According to Sveinbjörn Rafnsson, the Sturlubók and Hauksbók versions tend to overemphasise Christianity, Melabók less so. An epilogue to 'Þórðarbók, probably copied from Melabók, justifies studying Icelandic history as a defence against foreign accusations of descent from "slaves or rogues" and because "all reasonable peoples" want to know about their origins.

== Historical accuracy ==
Some debate exists on whether the account is entirely historical or if some elements of the document may contain folklore and mythology. According to Icelandic historian Gunnar Karlsson, the story about Hrafna-Flóki draws similarities to the Bible story of Noah and the great flood, who also used three ravens to guide him to dry land after the deluge. The earliest preserved versions of Landnámabók are written after the Christianization of Iceland and some historians theorise that some of the content may be an attempt of early Icelandic Christians to tie the island into biblical lore. Although Gunnar also notes this does not disprove the story and the accuracy of the document remains inconclusive.

Other stories in the document are supported by other sources, according to another Icelandic historian, Helgi Þorláksson, the story of Ingólfr Arnarson's settlement seems to be accurate and in accordance with other sources.

== See also ==
- Cerball mac Dúnlainge, Irish ruler mentioned as Kjarvalur.
