= Algorithm (disambiguation) =

An algorithm is an unambiguous method of solving a specific problem.

Algorithm or algorhythm may also refer to:

== People ==
- Al-Khwarizmi, 8th century Persian originator of algebra, whose name (romanized variously as Algorithm, Alghoarism, Algorism, etc.) is the etymological origin of algorithm

== Music ==
- The Algorithm, a French musical project
- Algorythm Records, an imprint of the drum and bass group Counterstrike

=== Albums ===
- Algorithm (Natalie Imbruglia album), 2026
- Algorithm (My Heart to Fear album), 2013, or the title track
- Algorithm (Lucky Daye album), 2024
- The Algorithm (Filter album), 2023
- Algorhythm (Todrick Hall album), 2022 album by Todrick Hall
- Snoop Dogg Presents Algorithm, 2021 compilation album by Snoop Dogg
- Algorhythm, 1994 album by Boxcar
- Algorythm, 2018 album by Beyond Creation

=== Songs ===
- "Algorithm", a 2024 song by South Korean singer Chung Ha
- "Algorithm" (song), a 2018 song by Muse
- "Algorhythm", a 2018 song by Childish Gambino
- "Algorythm", a 2024 song by South Korean girl group Itzy

== Other ==
- Algorithm (C++), a C++ Standard Library header that provides implementations of common algorithms
- Algorithms (journal), a technical periodical
- A temporal inversion device in the 2020 science-fiction film Tenet
- Recommender system, used by social media companies and other online services for personalization, informally referred to as "algorithms" or "the algorithm"

== See also ==
- Algorithmic (disambiguation)
- Algorism
- Ruleset (disambiguation)
