= Völuspá =

Poem from the Poetic Edda

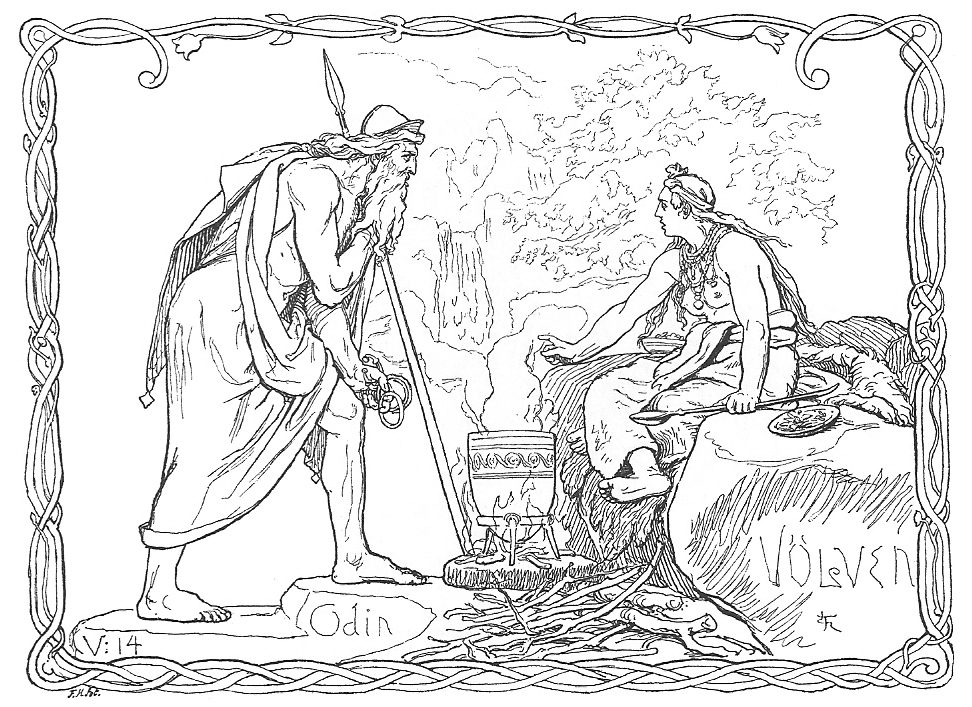
- "Odin and the Völva" (1895) by Lorenz Frølich
- Original title: Vǫluspǫ́
- Language: Old Norse
- Meter: Fornyrðislag

Full text
- Völuspá at Wikisource

Völuspá (also Vǫluspá, Vǫlospá, or Vǫluspǫ́; Old Norse: 'Prophecy of the völva, a seeress') is the best known poem of the Poetic Edda. It dates back to the tenth century and tells the story from Norse Mythology of the creation of the world, its coming end, and its subsequent rebirth that is related to the audience by a völva addressing Odin. Her name is given twice as Heiðr. The poem is one of the most important primary sources for the study of Norse mythology. Parts of the poem appear in the Prose Edda, but the earliest known wholly preserved version of the poem is in the Codex Regius and Hauksbók manuscripts.

== Preservation ==
Many of stanzas of Völuspá appear first in the Prose Edda (composed c. 1220, of which the oldest extant manuscript dates from the beginning of the fourteenth century, c. 1300), in which the stanzas are quoted or paraphrased. The full poem is found in the Icelandic Codex Regius manuscript (c. 1270) and in the Haukr Erlendsson Hauksbók Codex (c. 1334); the Codex Regius version is usually taken as a base for editions of the poem.

The order and number of the stanzas varies in the existing sources. Some editors and translators have further rearranged the material.

== Synopsis ==
The poem starts with the völva requesting silence from "the sons of Heimdallr" (human beings) and she then asks Odin whether he wants her to recite ancient lore based on her memory. She says she remembers jötnar born in antiquity who reared her, nine worlds, and the "famous tree" (mjǫtviðr mærr, perhaps Yggdrasill).

The völva proceeds to recite a creation myth, mentioning Ymir and that the world was nothing but the magical void, Ginnungagap, until the sons of Burr lifted the earth out of the sea. The Æsir then established order in the cosmos by finding places for the sun, the moon, and the stars, thereby starting the cycle of day and night. A golden age ensued in which the Æsir had plenty of gold and they happily constructed temples and made tools. But then three mighty maidens came from Jötunheimar and the golden age came to an end. The Æsir then created the dwarfs, of whom Mótsognir and Durinn are the mightiest.

At this point ten of the poem's stanzas are considered complete. A section then appears in some versions that usually is considered an interpolation. It is entitled the "Dvergatal" ("Catalogue of Dwarfs") and it contains six stanzas with names of dwarves. The antiquity and role of this section in the poem is not clear and sometimes is omitted by editors and translators.

The poem continues with the creations of the first humans that are recounted along with a description of the world-tree, Yggdrasil. The völva recalls the burning of Gullveig that led to the first "folk" war, where Heiðr is a name assumed by Gullveig in connection with the war of the deities, and what occurred in the struggle between the Æsir and Vanir. She then recalls the time the goddess Freyja was given to the jötnar, which is commonly interpreted as a reference to the myth of the jötunn builder, as told in Gylfaginning 42.

The völva then reveals to Odin that she knows some of his own secrets and that he sacrificed an eye in pursuit of knowledge. She tells him that she knows where his eye is hidden and how he gave it up in exchange for knowledge. In several refrains she asks him whether he understands or whether he would like to hear more.

In the Codex Regius version, the völva goes on to describe the slaying of Baldr, best and fairest of the deities and the enmity of Loki, and of others. Then the völva prophesies the destruction of the deities where fire and flood overwhelm heaven and earth as the deities fight their final battles with their enemies. This is the "fate of the gods", Ragnarök. She describes the summons to battle, the deaths of many of the deities, including the death of Odin, who is slain by Fenrir, the great wolf. The god of thunder and sworn protector of the earth, Thor, faces the world serpent Jörmungandr and wins, but Thor is only able to take nine steps afterward before collapsing due to the serpent's venom. Víðarr faces Fenrir and kicks his jaw open before stabbing the wolf in the heart with his spear. The god Freyr fights the giant Surtr, who wields a fiery sword that shines brighter than the sun, and Freyr falls.

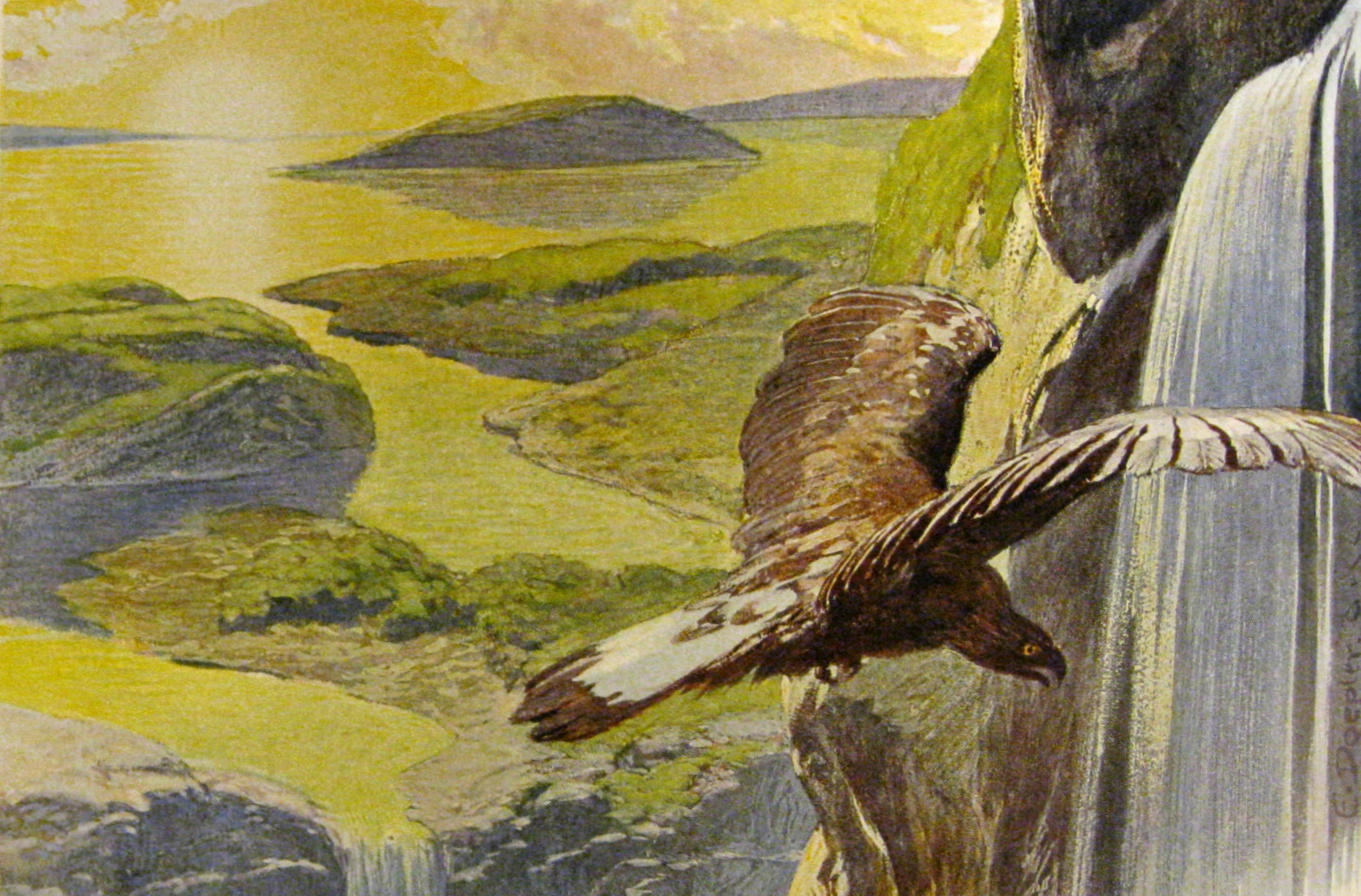
The new world that rises after Ragnarök (depiction by Emil Doepler)

Finally, the völva prophesies that a beautiful reborn world will rise from the ashes of death and destruction where Baldr and Höðr will live again in a new world and where the earth sprouts abundance without sowing seed. The surviving Æsir reunite with Hœnir and meet together at the field of Iðavöllr, discussing Jörmungandr, great events of the past, and the runic alphabet. A final stanza describes the sudden appearance of the dragon Nidhogg, bearing corpses in his wings, after which the völva emerges from her trance.

== Reception ==
Völuspá is one of the most discussed poems of the Poetic Edda and dates to the tenth century, the century before the Christianization of Iceland. In March 2018, a team of medieval historians and scientists from the University of Cambridge suggested that the Icelandic poem, Vǫluspá, that is estimated to date from 961 was a roughly contemporary chronicle of the eruption of the volcano Eldgjá in 939. These researchers suggested that the dramatic imagery of the Eldgjá eruption was purposefully invoked in order to accelerate the Christianization of Iceland.

Some scholars hold that there are Christian influences in the text, emphasizing parallels with the Sibylline Prophecies. Henry Adams Bellows stated in 1936 that the author of Völuspá would have had knowledge of Christianity and infused it into the poem. Bellows dates the poem to the tenth century that was a transitional period between paganism and Christianity and the two religions would have co-existed before Christianity was declared the official religion of Iceland and after which the old paganism was tolerated if practiced in private. He suggests that this infusion allowed the pagan traditions to survive to an extent in Iceland, unlike in mainland Scandinavia. Several researchers have suggested that the entire Dvergatal section and references to the "mighty one who rules over all" are later insertions. Although some have identified the latter figure with Jesus, Bellows thought this was not necessarily the case.

== In popular culture ==
- J. R. R. Tolkien, a philologist familiar with the Völuspá, used names from the Dvergatal for the Dwarves and for the Wizard Gandalf in his 1937 fantasy novel The Hobbit.
  Historian Casper Clemmensen argues that Tolkien also used the Völuspá as inspiration for Théoden's speech in The Return of the King.
- Stanzas from Völuspá are performed in song in the Television series Vikings and used as battle chants.
- The 2012 atmospheric black metal album Umskiptar by Burzum takes lyrics from Völuspá.
- Various stanzas from Völuspá are used in the song “Twilight of the Gods” in the 2020 video game Assassin's Creed Valhalla.

== Relevant literature ==
- Bugge, Sophus (1867). Norræn fornkvæði. Christiania: Malling. Available online
- Dronke, Ursula (1997). The Poetic Edda Volume II Mythological Poems. Oxford: Clarendon Press.
- Eysteinn Björnsson (ed.). Völuspá. Available online
- Gunnell, Terry and Annette Lassen, eds. 2013. The Nordic Apocalypse: Approaches to Völuspa and Nordic Days of Judgement. Brepols Publishers. 240 pages. ISBN 978-2-503-54182-2
- McKinnell, John (2008). "Völuspá and the Feast of Easter," Alvíssmál 12:3–28. (PDF)
- Sigurður Nordal (1952). Völuspá. Reykjavík: Helgafell.
- Ólason, Vésteinn. "Vǫluspá and time." In The Nordic Apocalypse: Approaches to Vǫluspá and Nordic Days of Judgement, pp. 25–44. 2013.
