= Alexanders saga =

Old Norse translation of Walter of Châtillon's Alexandreis

Alexanders saga is an Old Norse translation of Alexandreis, an epic Latin poem about the life of Alexander the Great written by Walter of Châtillon, which was itself based on Quintus Curtius Rufus's Historia Alexandri Magni. It is attributed in manuscripts of the saga to Brandr Jónsson, bishop of Skálholt who is also said to have been responsible for authoring Gyðinga saga. Kirsten Wolf has commented on the saga's literary qualities thus: "Alexanders saga [...] has stirred the admiration of scholars and writers for centuries because of its exceptionally imaginative use of the resources of language and its engaging narrative style."

== Manuscripts ==
Alexanders saga is preserved in five medieval Icelandic manuscripts and a number of later manuscripts, of which only Stock. Papp. fol. no. 1 has independent textual value. The main manuscript source of the text is AM 519a 4to, dating from 1270-1290. A fragment of the saga appears in AM 655 XXIX 4to which dates from the same period. It is also found in AM 226 fol (and its copy AM 225 fol) which contains the Biblical compilation Stjórn. In these manuscripts Alexanders saga comes after Rómverja saga and before Gyðinga saga. In AM 226 fol, AM 225 fol, and Stock. Perg. 4to no. 24 the text is shorter than AM 519a 4to and also contain a translation of Epistola Alexandri ad Aristotelem.

Kalinke and Mitchell identified the following manuscripts of the saga:

AM 190 b fol (17th c)
AM 225 fol (early 15th c), vellum
AM 226 fol (late 14th c), vellum
AM 519a 4to (late 13th c), vellum
AM 520 4to (ca 1700)
AM 655 4to XXIX (ca 1300), vellum
BL Add 11,238 fol (18th c.?)
BL Add 24,969 fol (ca 1731)
Bodleian Library, Oxford University: MS Boreal 141 fol (18th c)
Héraðsskjalasafn Skagfirðinga, Sauðárkrókur: HSk 452 4to (1780)
IB 115 4to (ca 1820)
JS 209 4to (ca 1760)
JS 390 8vo (18th-19th c)
JS 8 fol (1729)
Lbs 204 fol (1758-59)
Lbs 37 fol (early 18th c)
Lbs 373 4to (ca 1800)
Lbs 678 4to (ca 1852-54)
National Library, Edinburgh: Adv MS 21.2.6 fol (18th c)
Papp fol nr 1 (early 17th c)
Perg 4to nr 24 (mid- 15th c)
Rask 34 (1760)
Trinity College, Dublin: L.2.11 (late 18th c)

== Editions ==
- Unger, C. R., ed. (1848). Alexanders saga: Norsk bearbeidelse fra trettende aarhundrede af Philip Gautiers latinske digt Alexandreis. Christiania: Feilberg & Landmark.
- Jónsson, Finnur, ed. (1925). Alexanders saga : Islandsk oversættelse ved Brandr Jónsson (biskop til Holar 1263-64). Copenhagen.
- Helgason, Jón (ed.). Alexanders saga: The Arna-Magnæan Manuscript 519a, 4to. Copenhagen.
- Laxness, Halldór, ed. (1945). Alexandreis: það er Alexanders saga mikla (in Icelandic). Reykjavík: Heimskringla.
- Ingólfsson, Gunnlaugur, ed. (2002). Alexandreis, það er, Alexanders saga á íslensku (in Icelandic). Reykjavík: Steinholt.
- de Leeuw Weenen, Andrea, ed. (2009). Alexanders Saga: AM 519A 4to in the Arnamagnaean Collection, Copenhagen. Copenhagen: Museum Tusculanum Press.
