= Durinn =

Dwarf in Norse mythology

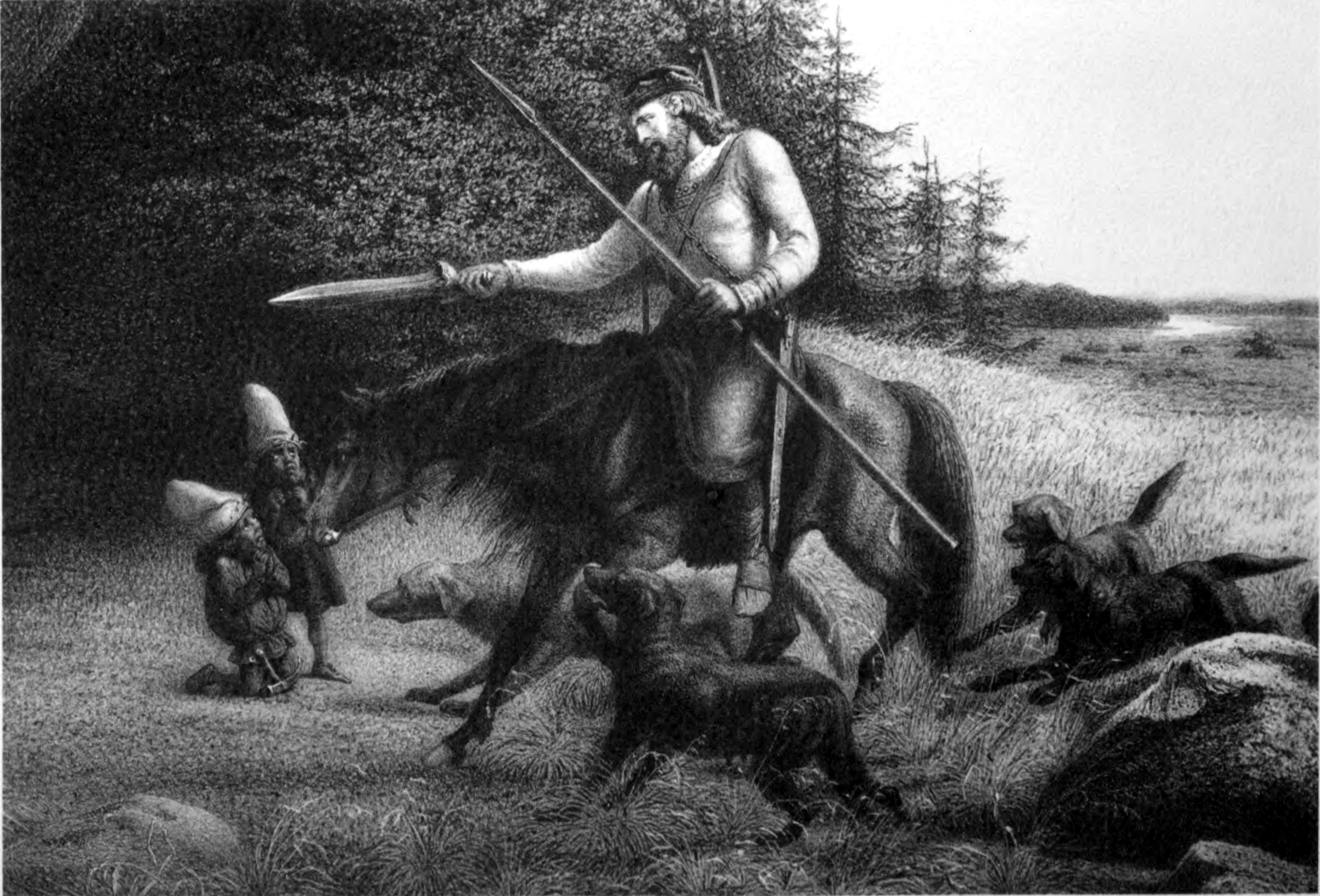
King Svafrlame Securing the Sword Tyrfing

In Norse mythology, Durinn (Old Norse: [ˈdurenː]; or Durin) is a dwarf according to stanza 10 of the poem Völuspá from the Poetic Edda, and repeated in Gylfaginning from the Prose Edda. He was the second created after the first and foremost dwarf Mótsognir.

He is also attested in Hervarar saga, where he forged the magic sword Tyrfing with the help of the dwarf Dvalin. In variant texts of the saga Durinn is known as Dulinn.

== Modern influence ==
In the legendarium of J. R. R. Tolkien, Durin is the name given to several kings of the Dwarves including Durin the Deathless, the eldest of the Seven Fathers of their race.
