= Haukr Erlendsson =

Lawspeaker of Iceland

Haukr or Hauk Erlendsson (died 1334; Modern Icelandic: Haukur Erlendsson [ˈhœyːkʏr ˈɛrˌlɛn(t)sˌsɔːn]) was lawspeaker (lawman) of Iceland, later lawspeaker and knight of Norway, known for having compiled a number of Icelandic sagas and other materials mostly in his own hand, bound in a book called the Hauksbók after him.

== Life ==
Hauk was born the son of Erlend Olafsson the Strong aka Erlend digre "the fat," who died 1312. (Note: "Erlendur digre" occurs in a letter by Bishop Árni Þorláksson of Skálholt dated 1286, Diplomatarium islandicum, Vol. II, p.136-7. Cf. Jón Sigurðsson; Guðbrandur Vigfússon, eds. (1858). Biskupa Sögur. Vol. 1. Kaupmannahöfn: S.L. Möller. p. 755., whose index clarifies this refers to Erlendur Ólafsson sterki) The year of Haukr's birth is not known, but his mother's name was Jorunn (Old Norse: Jórunn), whose ancestry is traceable to a brother of King Halfr of Hordaland, hero of Hálfs saga ok Hálfsrekka. (Note: Hogni the White given in Landnámabók Part II, Ch. XIX as the forebear of Hauk Erelendson's mother was the grandson of Otrygg, brother of King Halfr according to an earlier passage (Landnámabók Part II, Ch. XIX Thorgilsson 1898, pp. 74)) (Note: As an aside, Hogni the White had one son Eirek (from whom Haukr is descended), and another son Ulf the Squinter (Úlfr inn skjálgr), who accompanied his kinsman Geirrid son of Geirmund Hellskin, son of Hjor, son of Half into Iceland. Ulf the Squinter's son Jorunn had a daughter Thjodhild who became the wife of Erik the Red. (Landnámabók Part II, Ch. XIX, loc. cit. and Ch. XXII, Thorgilsson 1898, pp. 81–82) Thus Hauk was also distantly (not directly) related to Leif Eiriksson.)

Hauk may have been an illegitimate offspring, although the question of whether his mother was Erlend's "first wife or mistress" is an open speculation. At any rate it is clear Hauk had a stepmother at some point, since Jarngerd (Old Norse: Járngerðr) is called Erlend's wife in the Landnamabók and this Jarngerd was beyond doubt the wife who survived Erlend's death in 1312. Hauk also had a half-sister named Valgerd, born to Jarngerd.

Hauk married Steinunn, a descendant of Hrafn Sveinbjornsson. (Note: Guðbrandur Vigfússon 1878, Sturlunga saga, p. clxi says the wife was the granddaughter of Hrafn Sveinbiornsson, but according to Landnamabok Part V, Ch. IX, the Steinunn who was Rafn (Hrafn)'s granddaughter was a great aunt of the Steinunn who married Hauk Erlendsson. i.e., the Steinunn in question was Hrafn's great-great-grandfather.)

Hauk's father Erlend became lawspeaker (lögmaðr) of Iceland in 1287, went overseas in 1289, retired as lawspeaker and was awarded the Westfjords in 1290 or 1292 according to some sources. Somewhere along, though not in his early years, Hauk was educated abroad in Norway, where "he owes his whole education".

Like his father before him, Hauk became lawspeaker of Iceland no later than 1294, serving the post until 1299. Around 1301 he arrived in Norway, and served from 1303 to 1322 as lawspeaker (Norwegian: lagmann) in Oslo and on the Gula Thing. Sometime after 1303, he is mentioned as being on the king's council. He was also one of the men who ruled to recognize Magnus IV of Sweden as king over Norway.

During this period, lawmen may or may not be conferred the title of herra (at least those in Iceland), at any rate, Hauk serving in Norway is addressed as "herra" in a 1309 letter, and in a letter dating from 1311, he is called "the lawspeaker of the Gula Thing and knight."

== Works ==
The Hauksbók is a compilation that includes Icelandic sagas and a redaction of the Landnámabók, as well as an arithmetical treatise called the Algorismus. Among the sagas included is a version of Eiríks saga rauða, which includes the accounts of the exploration and the attempted colonization in the American continent by Thorfinn Karlsefni, whom Hauk counts as one of his ancestors. He also penned "Hauk's Annals," which chronicled the events of his lifetime.

== Family tree ==
The following stemma is drawn from the genealogy appended to the last chapter of Eiríks saga rauða in Hauk's own recension (in the Hauksbók, supplemented with additional information from the Landnámabók).

Thorir of Espihill
Thorvald Hook (Note: Þorvaldr krók)	Thorfinn Karlsefni
Grundar-Ketil	Snorri Karlsefnisson
Einar	Steinunn
Thorstein the Unjust (Note: Þorsteinn ranglátr; also in Landnamabók, Part III, Ch. X and translated as "Thorstein Wrongdoer" (Thorgilsson 1898, , p.136))
Jorund of Keldur	Gudrun
Bjarni Bjarnason (Note: Landnamabók, Part V, Ch. VII (Islandinga sögur, Vol. 1, p.295; Thorgilsson 1898, p. 202))	Halla
Flosi the priest (Note: Landnamabók, Part IV, Ch. I (Islandinga sögur, Vol. 1, p.240; Thorgilsson 1898, p. 165))	Ragnhild
Olaf(?)	Valgerd Flosadottir
Erlend the Strong	Jorunn (Note: Landnamabók, Part II, Ch. XIX (Islandinga sögur, Vol. 1, p.138; Thorgilsson 1898, p. 86))
Hauk the Lawman
