= Algorithmic complexity =

Algorithmic complexity may refer to:

- In algorithmic information theory, the complexity of a particular string in terms of all algorithms that generate it.
  - Solomonoff–Kolmogorov–Chaitin complexity, the most widely used such measure.
- In computational complexity theory, although it would be a non-formal usage of the term, the time/space complexity of a particular problem in terms of all algorithms that solve it with computational resources (i.e., time or space) bounded by a function of the input's size.
  - Or it may refer to the time/space complexity of a particular algorithm with respect to solving a particular problem (as above), which is a notion commonly found in analysis of algorithms.
  - Time complexity is the amount of computer time it takes to run an algorithm.
