= Prophetiae Merlini =

Book about the prophecies of Merlin

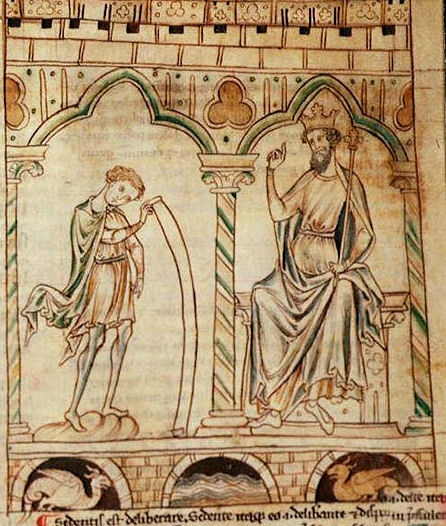
Manuscript illustration, Merlin with Vortigern, from the Prophetiæ Merlini.

The Prophetiæ Merlini is a Latin work of Geoffrey of Monmouth circulated, perhaps as a libellus or short work, from about 1130, and by 1135. Another name is Libellus Merlini.

The work contains a number of prophecies attributed to Merlin, the wizard of legend, whose mythical life is often regarded as created by Geoffrey himself, although Geoffrey claims to have based the figure on older Brittonic traditions, some of which may have been oral but now are lost. The Prophetiae preceded Geoffrey's larger Historia Regum Britanniæ of c. 1136, and was mostly incorporated in it, in Book VII; the prophecies, however, were influential and widely circulated in their own right. According to Geoffrey, he was prompted by Alexander of Lincoln to produce this section of his larger work separately.

== Background ==
The Prophetiæ is in some ways dependent on the De Excidio et Conquestu Britanniæ of Gildas. From Gildas and Nennius Geoffrey took the figure of Ambrosius Aurelianus, who figures in the preface to the prophecies (under a variant name): there is then a confusion made between Ambrosius and Merlin, deliberately done.

When Geoffrey's Historia was largely translated by Wace into the Roman de Brut, he omitted the material on Merlin's prophecies, though he does profess knowledge of them. It was still read in Latin, but was displaced for readers in French, and then English, by other political prophecy.

This work not only launched Merlin as a character of Arthurian legend: but it also created a distinctively English style of political prophecy, called Galfridian, in which animals represent particular political figures. Political prophecy in this style remained popular for at least 400 years. It was subversive, and the figure of the prophetic Merlin was strongly identified with it.

== Content and the character of Merlin ==
The Prophetiae is the work that introduced the character of Merlin (Merlinus), as he later appears in Arthurian legend. He mixes pagan and Christian elements. In this work Geoffrey drew from the established bardic tradition of prophetic writing attributed to the sage Myrddin, though his knowledge of Myrddin's story at this stage in his career appears to have been slight.

In the preface Vortigern asks Ambrosius (Merlin) to interpret the meaning of a vision. In it two dragons fought, one red and one white. Merlin replies that the Red Dragon meant the British race, the White Dragon the Saxons. The Saxons would be victorious. A long prophetic sequence forms the body of the work, relating mainly to the wars.

Many of its prophecies referring to historical and political events up to Geoffrey's lifetime can be identified – for example, the sinking of the White Ship in 1120, when William Adelin, son of Henry I, died.

Geoffrey apparently introduced the spelling "Merlin", derived from the Welsh "Myrddin". The Welsh scholar Rachel Bromwich observed that this "change from medial dd > l is curious. It was explained by Gaston Paris as caused by the undesirable associations of the French word merde". Alternatively this may preserve the Breton or Cornish original to which he may have been referring; John of Cornwall's (1141–55) version is notable for its localisation in the southwestern region known to Gildas and Nennius as Dumnonia.

== Influence ==
The first work about the prophet Myrddin in a language other than Welsh, the Prophetiae was widely read — and believed — much as the prophecies of Nostradamus were centuries later; John Jay Parry and Robert Caldwell note that the Prophetiae Merlini "were taken most seriously, even by the learned and worldly wise, in many nations", and list examples of this credulity as late as 1445.

Ordericus Vitalis quoted from the Prophetiae around 1134–5. At much the same time, and in the same area, Abbot Suger copied some of the prophecies almost exactly in his Life of Louis the Fat, for the purpose of praising Henry I of England. In the 1140s or early 1150s John of Cornwall produced another work collecting prophecies, that drew on the Prophetiae. It contained elements from other sources, however, which predominate. This work was also named Prophetiae Merlini. Gunnlaugr Leifsson made an Icelandic translation of the prophecies, Merlínússpá. There is a 15th-century English manuscript commentary on Geoffrey's work.

In the 16th century the founding legends of British history came under strong criticism, in particular from Polydore Vergil. On the other hand, they had their defenders, and there was a revival of Arthurian lore with a Protestant slant, used in particular by John Dee to develop the concept of the British Empire in the New World. By the 17th century Geoffrey's history in general, and Merlin's prophecies in particular, had become largely discredited as fabrications, for example as attacked by William Perkins. But the politics of the Union of the Crowns of 1603 gave the prophecies a short new lease of life (see Jacobean debate on the Union). The Whole Prophesie of Scotland of that year treated Merlin's prophecies as authoritative. James Maxwell, a student of prophecy who put it to political use in the reign of James VI and I, distinguished between the Welsh and "Caledonian" Merlins.
