= Rómverja saga =

Old Norse-Icelandic translation of three Latin texts concerning Roman history

Rómverja saga (The Saga of the Romans) in an Old Norse-Icelandic translation of three Latin historical texts: Sallust's Bellum Jugurthinum and Coniuratio Catilinae and Lucan's Pharsalia. It gives an account of Roman history from the Jugurthine War (112 BCE) to the death of Augustus (14 CE). This combination of sources is unique in medieval literature. Along with Breta sögur, Veraldar saga and Trójumanna saga, it represent the earliest phase of translation of secular works into Old Norse-Icelandic.

Rómverja saga exists in two versions: an older and longer, but poorly preserved version in AM 595a-b 4to; and a younger, abridged version in AM 226 fol, copied in AM 225 fol.

There are close parallels between sections of Veraldar saga and Rómverja saga. Hofmann proposed that Veraldar saga takes its Roman history from Rómverja saga. Þorbjörg Helgadóttir instead considers that the two sagas both used the same Latin sources: Sallust and Lucan.
