= Dares Phrygius =

Mythical Trojan writer

Dares Phrygius i.e Dares of Phrygia (Ancient Greek: Δάρης), according to Homer, was a Trojan priest of Hephaestus. In the Iliad, his two sons, Idaeus and Phegeus, rode out to fight the Achaean hero Diomedes. After Diomedes killed Phegeus, Idaeus was rescued by Hephaestus, who wrapped him in a cloud of darkness.

He was later thought to have been the author of an account of the destruction of Troy. A work in Latin, purporting to be a translation of this, and entitled Daretis Phrygii de excidio Troiae historia, was much read in the Middle Ages, and was then ascribed to Cornelius Nepos, who is made to dedicate it to Sallust; but the language better fits a period much later than the time of Nepos (probably the 5th century AD).

It is unknown whether the existing work is an abridgment of a larger Latin work or an adaptation of a Greek original. Together with the similar work of Dictys Cretensis (with which it is generally printed), the De excidio forms the chief source for the numerous medieval accounts of the Trojan legend, the so-called Matter of Troy. Dares claimed 866,000 Greeks and 676,000 Trojans were killed in this war, but archaeology has uncovered nothing that suggests a war of this scale was ever fought on that site.

The work was a significant source for Joseph of Exeter's De bello Troiano. It was also completely reworked in the 8th century in Merovingian Gaul into the work entitled Historia de origine Francorum ('History of the Origins of the Franks'), which purports to describe the descent of the Franks from the Trojans and is attributed to Dares. The work is also translated into Norse, Trójumanna saga, which appears quite unique as it deviates considerably from the Latin translation ascribed to Cornelius Nepos in the 5th century. The 12th- or 13th-century Trójumanna saga (dating uncertain) begins with the story of Frey, the vanir-god, as a young poor man living on Crete at the time of the biblical Josva. The saga begins with how he steals the secret of gold from the Gyðinga people – the People of Guðř, and becomes the richest man on earth and lets his subjects believe he is a god. The saga tells that the romans know Frey as Saturnus of Crete. One of his sons is Thor, which the saga explains the Romans know as Jupiter. It appears quite clear that the author of the Norse saga is aware that the Roman names are translations as well. The Norse saga can hardly be said to be a translation of the Latin version, but is likely aware of the Dares Phrygius History of the Fall of Troy and appears even more in concord with the humanistic philosophy of Euhemerius in the Norse version than that of the Cornelius Nepos. Jupiter's son Mercurius is not explained as Oðin, although the names of the seven days reveals that the fourth day as Oðin's day, among Norse and Germanic languages. Mercurius is not the son of Juno, which indeed is identified as Sif, who in many other medieval Norse sources is explained as the mythical first oracular Sibyl. In Trojumanna saga, Mercurius is the son of the concubine Maya and the father of Erkules, with Ío, who Sif tries to let some snakes kill. The saga refers to Dares as Meistari Dares. It appears that the Icelandic author knows, or at least pretends to know, a different source than the Latin translation of Master Dares.

== Sources ==
- O.S. von Fleschenberg, Daresstudie, i, 1908.
- Gudeman, Alfred (1894). "Literary Frauds among the Romans". Transactions of the American Philological Association. 25: 140–164. doi:10.2307/2935663. ISSN 0271-4442. JSTOR 2935663.
- (fr) Louis Faivre d'Arcier, Histoire et géographie d’un mythe. La circulation des manuscrits du De excidio Troiae de Darès le Phrygien (VIIIe-XVe s.), Paris, 2006 (ISBN 2-900791-79-0).
- (de) Andreas Beschorner, Untersuchungen zu Dares Phrygius-Narr, Tübingen, 1992 (ISBN 3-8233-4863-9).
- History and Novel in Antiquity
