= Algorismus (Norse text) =

Algorismus is a short treatise on mathematics, written in Old Icelandic. It is the oldest text on mathematics in a Scandinavian language and survives in the early fourteenth-century manuscript Hauksbók, a large book written and compiled by Icelanders and taken to Norway during the later part of the 13th century by Haukur Erlendsson. It primarily consists of a translation of Carmen de Algorismo by Alexander of Villedieu from c. 1200, which was in turn translated from the works of al-Khwarismi, and which, with Liber Abaci by Fibonacci of 1202, and Algorismus Vulgaris by De Sacrobosco of 1230 formed the "three main Latin algorithmic works in the Middle Ages".
