= Gyðinga saga =

Old Norse account of Jewish history

Gyðinga saga (Saga of the Jews) is an Old Norse account of Jewish history compiled from translations of a number of Latin texts. Beginning with an account of Alexander the Great's conquests, it proceeds to cover around 220 years of Jewish history from Antiochus IV Epiphanes's accession in 175 BCE to Pontius Pilate becoming procurator of Judaea in 26 CE. The main manuscript source for Gyðinga saga concludes with an epilogue which attributes its translation into Old Norse to Brandr Jónsson (d. 1264), bishop of Hólar. In this manuscript Gyðinga saga follows Alexanders saga, which is also attributed to Brandr Jónsson. The saga is untitled in all manuscripts; the name Gyðinga saga appears to date from the 19th century. Árni Magnússon referred to it as both 'Historia Judaica' and 'Historia Macchabeorum'.

== Etymology ==
Gyðinga is the Old Norse genitive plural of Gyðingr, which is derived from the Old Norse word guð ("God"), with the suffix -ingr (a noun suffix used to refer to people associated with another noun). Thus it could be literally translated as "God-people" or "God-followers."

It is the source of the modern Icelandic word for a Jew, gyðingur, and the Faroese word gýðingur.

== Preservation and authorship ==
Gyðinga saga is preserved in five vellum manuscripts and sixteen paper manuscripts, of which seven have independent value. The saga is preserved intact in AM 226 fol from 1350–1360. However, comparison with the older fragments AM 655 XXV 4to and AM 238 XVII fol shows that Gyðinga saga was originally longer, and that the version in AM 226 fol has been reduced in length by around one third.

Gyðinga saga concludes with the following epilogue:

The holy priest Jerome translated this book from Hebrew into Latin, but it was translated from Latin into Norse by the priest Brandr Jónsson, who was later bishop of Hólar; and [Brandr] then [translated] Alexander the Great at the behest of the honorable lord, Lord King Magnus, son of King Hákon the Old.

As Brandr died in 1264, this is as late as the saga could have been originally compiled, if it was indeed written by him. This date can be pushed back to 1263 as the epilogue refers to Brandr as 'priest' not 'bishop'; he served as bishop of Hólar from 1263 until his death the following year. Magnus Haakonsson held the title of king from 1257. This places the authorship of Gyðinga saga sometime between 1257 and 1263, if the epilogue's attribution is correct.

== Contents ==
In AM 226 fol, Gyðinga saga is split into 39 chapters; these fall into 3 sections based on different sources. The first 21 chapters are based on 1 Maccabees, with additional material taken from 2 Maccabees and Petrus Comestor's Historia scholastica. Chapters 22–32 are based on the Historia scholastica. The final section, chapters 33–38 are based on a precursor to Jacobus de Voragine's Golden Legend. This final section gives an apocryphal account of the lives of Pontius Pilate and Judas Iscariot as well as a short version of Jewish history from Caligula becoming emperor in 37 CE to the death of Herod Agrippa in 44 CE. Towards the end of the saga, some of its content over laps with that of Rómverja saga.

Despite being based on Biblical sources, Gyðinga saga plays down the moral and religious aspects of its sources and is presented as a work of historiography.
