= Hauksbók =

14th century Icelandic manuscript

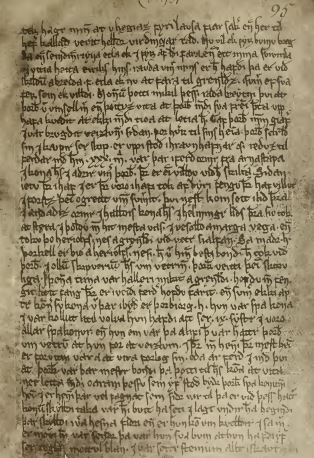
A page from Hauksbók

Hauksbók (Icelandic pronunciation: [ˈhœyksˌpouːk]; 'Book of Haukr') is a 14th-century Icelandic manuscript created by Haukr Erlendsson. Significant portions of it are lost, but it contains the earliest copies of many of the texts it contains, including the Saga of Eric the Red. In most cases, Haukr copied from earlier, now lost manuscripts. Among these are the section on mathematics called Algorismus, the text of Hervarar saga ok Heiðreks. It was originally in one part, but now split in three (AM 371 4to, AM 544 4to and AM 675 4to) and held at the Árni Magnússon Institute for Icelandic Studies in Reykjavík, Iceland.

== Composition ==
Hauksbók is associated with an Icelandic lawspeaker named Haukr Erlendsson: although the work of several scribes, the vast majority is in Haukr's hand. Palaeographical evidence allowed Professor Stefán Karlsson, director of the Árni Magnússon Institute for Icelandic Studies, to date the manuscript to between 1302 and 1310. As long back as it is possible to trace the manuscript it has been called Hauksbók after him. Hauksbók is a compilation that includes Icelandic sagas and a redaction of Landnámabók. The book contains versions, often the only or earliest extant versions, of many Old Icelandic texts, such as Fóstbrœðra saga, the Saga of Eric the Red, Hervarar saga ok Heiðreks, and Völuspá. Haukr tended to rewrite the sagas that he copied, generally shortening them.

In addition, Haukr Erlendsson wrote "Hauk's Annals," which chronicled events of his lifetime and a handbook on Norse law.

== Contents ==
The known contents of Hauksbók are:

=== AM 371 4to ===
1. (1r-14v): Landnámabók
2. (15r-18v): Kristni saga

=== AM 544 4to ===
1. (1r-14v): encyclopaedic information drawn from various sources, on geography, natural phenomena, and Biblical stories
2. (15r-19v): encyclopaedic information drawn from various sources, on philosophy and theology
3. (20r-21r): Völuspá
4. (22r-33v): Trójumanna saga
5. (34r): a text called 'Seven Precious Stones And Their Nature'
6. (35v): Cisiojanus (a versified Latin enumeration for remembering the church festivals throughout the year)
7. (36r-59r): Breta sögur, including Merlínússpá
8. (60r-68v): two dialogues between the soul and the body
9. (69r-72v:9): Hemings þáttr Áslákssonar
10. (72v:9-76v): Hervarar saga ok Heiðreks
11. (77r-89v:35): Fóstbrœðra saga
12. (89v:35-93r:17): Algorismus
13. (93r:17-101v:24): Eiríks saga rauða
14. (101v:25-104v:17): Skálda saga
15. (104v:18-105r:21): Af Upplendinga konungum
16. (105r:21-107v): Ragnarssona þáttr
17. (107v): Prognostica Temporum

=== AM 675 4to ===
1. Elucidarius

== Editions ==
Hauksbók is often included as a witness in editions of the individual sagas that it contains. It has been edited as whole in the following:

- Hauksbók, udg. efter de Arnamagnæanske håndskrifter no. 371, 544 og 675, 4̊, samt forskellige papirshåndskrifter af det Kongelige nordiske oldskrift-selskab, ed. by Finnur Jónsson and Eiríkur Jónsson (København: Thiele, 1892–96)
- Hauksbók: The Arna-Magnæan Manuscripts, 371, 4to, 544, 4to, and 675, 4to., ed. by Jón Helgason, Manuscripta Islandica, 5 (Copenhagen: Munksgaard, 1960) [facsimile]
