= Trójumanna saga =

Icelandic saga

Trójumanna saga (The Saga of the Men of Troy) is a saga in Old Norse which tells the story of the matter of Troy. It is the Old Icelandic translation of the Daretis Phrygii De Excidio Troiae Historia (Dares Phrygius’ History of the Destruction of Troy). The saga expands on the basic framework provided by Dares to create a story with many particularly Norse elements and values.

== Composition and sources ==
Trójumanna saga was most likely composed by an Icelander in the mid-thirteenth century. Today there exist three separate and different redactions of Trójumanna saga, themselves dating from probably the thirteenth and fourteenth century. These are known as the Hauksbók, Beta, and the Alpha redactions. Trójumanna saga Alpha, though the last to be discovered by modern scholars, is the closest to Dares' Historia in that it uses fewer supplementary sources than the other two versions. As such, it was published as Trójumanna saga: The Dares Phrygius Version, by Jonna Louis-Jensen. Randi Claire Eldevik states that although Trójumanna saga Alpha has only a few sources other than De Excidio Troiae Historia, "its treatment of [De Excidio Troiae Historia] is elaborately embellished in comparison with the other two redactions." These other sources are the Ilias Latina attributed to Publius Baebius Italicus, and Heroides by Ovid.

== Synopsis of the Alpha Redaction ==
The saga begins with the journey of Jason and his Argonauts. On the way to find the Golden Fleece they stop at Troy. Laomedon, King of Troy, forces Jason to leave his lands for fear of a Greek invasion. This is the start of a feud between the Trojans and the Greeks. After Jason acquires the Golden Fleece, he remains in Phrygia with Medea.

Hercules, however, gathers a Greek army and returns to Troy. After a brief war, Troy falls and Telamon takes Laomedon's daughter and Priam's sister, Hesione, back to Greece. Priam, after rebuilding Troy, summons his five sons: Hector, Alexander (Paris), Deiphobus, Helenus, and Troilus, and they decide to avenge their grandfather, Laomedon.

Alexander tricks Helen into vowing to marry him by tossing a golden apple into her lap. On the apple is inscribed, "I swear by the god that I shall be wed to Alexander and be his queen henceforward," which Helen unwittingly reads aloud, thus binding herself by oath to Alexander, who takes her back to Greece, inciting the Trojan War.

The course of the war is described in detail from the first landing of the Greeks to the taking of the city. Hector is Troy's greatest protector until he is slain by Achilles in an even fight. After this Troilus and the rest of the sons of Priam fill the role. Achilles is a less central character to the story than in Homer's Iliad, though he is still most often responsible for the deaths of prominent Trojans. He falls in love with Polyxena, Priam's daughter, is drawn into an ambush for her sake, and is assassinated by Alexander after a heroic last stand.

Antenor and Aeneas, along with many townsmen, betray the city by letting the Greeks in during the night. Neoptolemus Pyrrhus, son of Achilles, kills Priam at the altar of Thor. In the days following the sack of the city Neoptolemus searches for and finds Polyxena (who had been under Aeneas' protection). Blaming her for his father's death, Neoptolemus insists on her execution. After she defends herself in a passionate, but futile speech, he cuts off her head.

The saga closes with a very brief summary of the Greeks' return home and the casualty counts of the war.

== Editions ==
- Jón Sigurðsson, ed. "Trójumanna saga." In "Trojumanna saga ok Breta sogur efter Hauksbok, med dansk Oversaettelse", Annaler for nordisk Historie (1848), 4-100 (Hauksbók version; repr. as Trojumanna saga hin forna, prentuð eftir útgáfu Jóns Sigurðssonar i donskum Annalum 1848 (Reykjavik: Prentsmioja D. Ostlunds, 1913).
- [Finnur Jonsson and Eirikur Jonsson, eds.] "Trojumannasaga." In Hauksbok udgiven efter de Arnamagnceanske Handskrifter no. 371, 544 og 675, 4° samt forskellige Papirhandskrifter (Copenhagen: Det kongelige nordiske Oldskrift-Selskab, 1892-96).
- Jón Helgason, ed. "Trojumanna saga." In The Arna-Magnæan Manuscripts 371, 4to, 544, 4to, and 675, 4to (Copenhagen: Munksgaard, 1960).
- Louis-Jensen, Jonna, ed. Trojumanndsaga, Editiones Arnamagnaeanae, A, 8 (Copenhagen: Munksgaard, 1963) (based on Univ. Libr. Uppsala, R:706 and Ihre 76; Royal Library Stockholm, Papp. 4:o nr 29 and Papp. fol. nr 58; AM 573, 4°; AM 598, 4°, IIα and β; AM 544, 4°).
- Louis-Jensen, Jonna, ed. Trojumanna saga. The Dares Phrygius Version, Editiones Arnamagnaeanae, A, 9 (Copenhagen: Reitzel, 1981 [1982]).
- Owens, Jeremy Jasper, trans. Trojumanna Saga: First Full English Translation (Cedar Hill, Tennessee: EO, 2023). ISBN 979-8392479757.
