= Geoffrey of Monmouth =

Cleric and writer (c. 1095 – c. 1155)

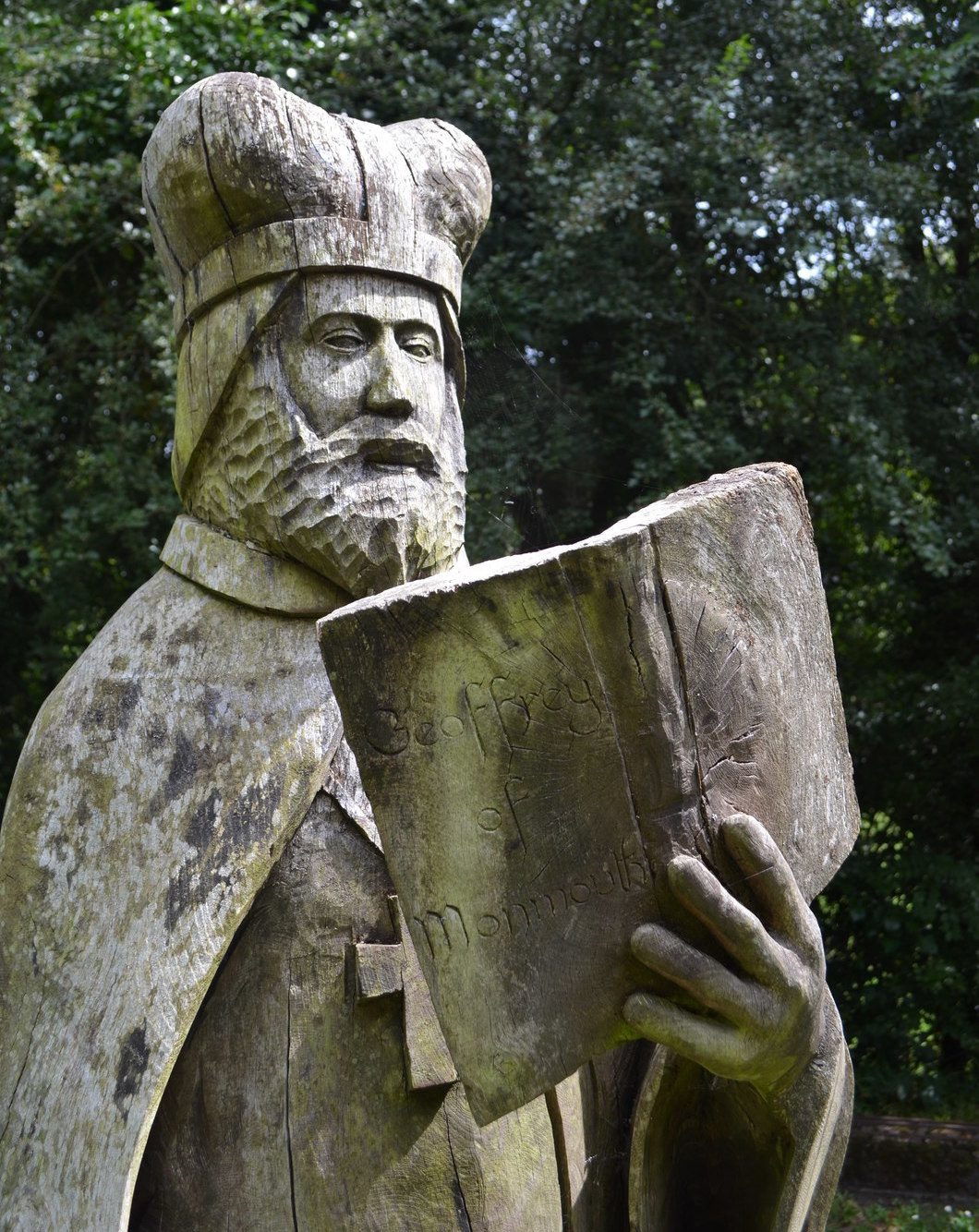
- Statue of Geoffrey at the Old Station Tintern in Monmouthshire
- Born: Galfridus Arturus c. 1095; Possibly Monmouth, Wales
- Died: c. 1155 (aged 59–60)
- Other names: Galfridus Monemutensis; Galfridus Arturus; Galfridus Artur; Gruffudd ap Arthur; Sieffre o Fynwy
- Occupation: Catholic cleric
- Known for: Historia Regum Britanniae Prophetiae Merlini Vita Merlini

Geoffrey of Monmouth (Latin: Galfridus Monemutensis, Galfridus Arturus; c. 1095 – c. 1155) was a Christian cleric from Monmouth, Wales, and one of the major figures in the popularity of tales of King Arthur.

He is best known for his chronicle The History of the Kings of Britain (Latin: De gestis Britonum or Historia Regum Britanniae) which was widely popular in its day, being translated into other languages from its original Latin. It was given historical credence well into the 16th century, but is now considered historically unreliable.

== Ethnicity and background ==
Geoffrey was born in Wales or the Welsh Marches. He refers to himself in his Historia as Galfridus Monemutensis (Geoffrey of Monmouth), which indicates a significant connection to Monmouth, Wales, and may refer to his birthplace. His works attest to some acquaintance with the place-names of the region. Geoffrey was known to his contemporaries as Galfridus Arturus or variants thereof. The "Arthur" in these versions of his name may indicate the name of his father or a nickname based on his scholarly interests.

Earlier scholars assumed that Geoffrey was Welsh or at least spoke Welsh. His knowledge of this language appears to have been slight, however, and there is no evidence that he was of either Welsh or Cambro-Norman descent. He may have come from the same French-speaking elite of the Welsh border country as Gerald of Wales, Walter Map and Robert, Earl of Gloucester, to whom Geoffrey dedicated versions of his History. Sir Frank Stenton and others have suggested that Geoffrey's parents may have been among the many Bretons who took part in William the Conqueror's conquest and settled in the southeast of Wales. Monmouth had been in the hands of Breton lords since 1075 or 1086, and the names Galfridus and Arthur were more common among the Bretons than the Welsh.

His ethnicity has been heavily debated by scholars. Some of the possibilities include Welsh, Breton, Norman, or even Cornish descent.

== Life and career ==
Geoffrey was born between about 1090 and 1100. He had reached the age of majority by 1129 when he is recorded as witnessing a charter.

He may have served for a while in the Benedictine Monmouth Priory, but most of his adult life appears to have been spent outside Wales. Between 1129 and 1151, his name appears on six charters in the Oxford area, sometimes styled magister (teacher). He was probably a secular canon of St. George's college. All the charters signed by Geoffrey are also signed by Walter, Archdeacon of Oxford, a canon at that church. Another frequent co-signatory is Ralph of Monmouth, a canon of Lincoln.

Archbishop Theobald of Bec consecrated Geoffrey as Bishop of St Asaph at Lambeth on 24 February 1152, having ordained him a priest at Westminster 10 days before. According to Lewis Thorpe, "There is no evidence that he ever visited his see, and indeed the wars of Owain Gwynedd make this most unlikely." He appears to have died between 25 December 1154 and 24 December 1155 according to Welsh chronicles, when his successor took office.

== Works ==
Geoffrey's structuring and shaping of the Merlin and Arthur myths engendered their vast popularity which continues today, and he is generally viewed by scholars as the major establisher of the Arthurian canon. The History's effect on the legend of King Arthur was so vast that Arthurian works have been categorised as "pre-Galfridian" and "post-Galfridian", depending on whether or not they were influenced by him.

=== Historia Regum Britanniae ===
Geoffrey wrote several works in Latin, the language of learning and literature in Europe during the medieval period. His major work was the Historia Regum Britanniae (The History of the Kings of Britain), the work best known to modern readers. It relates the purported history of Britain, from its first settlement by Brutus of Troy, a descendant of Trojan hero Aeneas, to the death of Cadwaladr in the 7th century, covering Julius Caesar's invasions of Britain, kings Leir and Cymbeline, and one of the earliest developed narratives of King Arthur.

Geoffrey claims in his dedication that the book is a translation of an "ancient book in the British language that told in orderly fashion the deeds of all the kings of Britain", given to him by Walter, Archdeacon of Oxford, but modern historians have dismissed this claim. It is likely, however, that the Archdeacon did furnish Geoffrey with some materials in the Welsh language which helped inspire his work, as Geoffrey's position and acquaintance with him would not have permitted him to fabricate such a claim outright. Much of it is based on the Historia Britonum, a 9th-century Welsh-Latin historical compilation, Bede's Ecclesiastical History of the English People, and Gildas's 6th-century polemic De Excidio et Conquestu Britanniae, expanded with material from bardic oral tradition and genealogical tracts, and embellished by Geoffrey's own imagination. In an exchange of manuscript material for their own histories, Robert of Torigny gave Henry of Huntingdon a copy of History, which both Robert and Henry used uncritically as authentic history and subsequently used in their own works, by which means Geoffrey's fictions became embedded in popular history.

The History of the Kings of Britain is now usually considered a literary forgery containing little reliable history. This has since led many modern scholars to agree with William of Newburgh, who wrote around 1190 that "it is quite clear that everything this man wrote about Arthur and his successors, or indeed about his predecessors from Vortigern onwards, was made up, partly by himself and partly by others."

Other contemporaries were similarly unconvinced by Geoffrey's History. For example, Gerald of Wales recounts the experience of a man possessed by demons: "If the evil spirits oppressed him too much, the Gospel of St John was placed on his bosom, when, like birds, they immediately vanished; but when the book was removed, and the History of the Britons by 'Geoffrey Arthur' [as Geoffrey named himself] was substituted in its place, they instantly reappeared in greater numbers, and remained a longer time than usual on his body and on the book."

Geoffrey's major work was nevertheless widely disseminated throughout medieval Western Europe; Acton Griscom listed 186 extant manuscripts in 1929, and others have been identified since. It enjoyed a significant afterlife in a variety of forms, including translations and adaptations such as Wace's Old Norman-French Roman de Brut, Layamon's Middle English Brut, and several anonymous Middle Welsh versions known as Brut y Brenhinedd ("Brut of the Kings"). where it was generally accepted as a true account.

In 2017, Miles Russell published the initial results of the Lost Voices of Celtic Britain Project established at Bournemouth University. The main conclusion of the study was that the Historia Regum Britanniae appears to contain significant demonstrable archaeological fact, despite being compiled many centuries after the period that it describes. Geoffrey seems to have brought together a disparate mass of source material, including folklore, chronicles, king-lists, dynastic tables, oral tales, and bardic praise poems, some of which was irrevocably garbled or corrupted. In doing so, Geoffrey exercised considerable editorial control, massaging the information and smoothing out apparent inconsistencies in order to create a single grand narrative which fed into the preferred narrative of the Norman rulers of Britain. Much of the information that he used can be shown to be derived from two discrete sources:

- the orally transmitted, heroic tales of the Catuvellauni and Trinovantes, two essentially pre-Roman tribes inhabiting central south-eastern Britain at the very end of the Iron Age;
- the king-lists of important post-Roman dynasties that ruled territories in western Britain.

Stretching this source material out, chopping, changing and re-editing it in the process, Geoffrey added not just his own fictions but also additional information culled from Roman and early medieval histories and early medieval writers such as Gildas and Bede.

=== Other writings ===
Geoffrey's earliest writing was probably the Prophetiae Merlini (Prophecies of Merlin) which he wrote before 1135, and which appears both independently and incorporated into The History of the Kings of Britain. It consists of a series of obscure prophetic utterances attributed to Merlin which he claimed to have translated from an unspecified language.

The third work attributed to Geoffrey is the hexameter poem Vita Merlini (Life of Merlin), based more closely on traditional material about Merlin than the other works. Here he is known as Merlin of the Woods (Merlinus Sylvestris) or Scottish Merlin (Merlinus Caledonius) and is portrayed as an old man living as a crazed and grief-stricken outcast in the forest. The story is set long after the timeframe of the History's Merlin, but the author tries to synchronise the works with references to the mad prophet's previous dealings with Vortigern and Arthur. The Vita did not circulate widely, and the attribution to Geoffrey appears in only one late-13th-century manuscript, but it contains recognisably Galfridian elements in its construction and content, and most critics recognise it as his.

== In popular culture ==
In the 2008 BBC series Merlin, the character of Geoffrey of Monmouth was played by Michael Cronin.

== See also ==
- Adam of Usk
- Ranulf Higden
- William of Malmesbury
- Henry of Huntingdon
