= Magnús Jónsson í Vigur =

17th-century Icelandic landowner

Magnús Jónsson í Vigur (1637–1702) was a wealthy Icelandic landowner who is best known for his patronage of manuscripts and interest in Icelandic and foreign literature. Magnús is often referred to as Magnús í Vigur because his primary residence during his lifetime was at a farm on the small island of Vigur in Ísafjarðardjúp in the Westfjords of Iceland. He is also sometimes called Magnús digri (the stout).

== Biography ==
Magnús was born on 17 September 1637 in Vatnsfjörður in Vatnsfjarðarsveit in the Westfjords and died at Vigur on 23 March 1702 at the age of 64. Magnús's parents were the Reverend Jón Arason (1606–1673), minister at Vatnsfjörður and educated in Copenhagen, and Hólmfríður Sigurðardóttir (1617–1692). They married in 1636. Magnús was the first of nine children, with a 20-year age span from oldest to youngest. He had four sisters and four brothers:

- Helga (1638–1718)
- Ragnheiður the elder (b. 1639)
- Ragnheiður the younger (1646–1715)
- Anna (1650–1722)
- Guðbrandur (1641–1690)
- Sigurður (1643–1730)
- Oddur (1648–1711)
- Ari (1657–1698)

Magnús came from a powerful and wealthy family. In addition to being the son of a wealthy Lutheran minister, he was the great-grandson of two Lutheran bishops on both parents' sides: on his father's side, Guðbrandur Þorláksson (d. 1627), Bishop of Hólar and famous for having the first Bible printed in Icelandic, known later as Guðbrandsbiblia; on his mother's side, Oddur Einarson (1559–1630), Bishop of Skálholt. Magnús was also the great-great-great grandson of Iceland's last Catholic bishop, Jón Arason of Hólar (1484–1550).

=== Education ===
Magnús's father Jón Arason was not only a Lutheran minister, but a highly educated man who wrote both poetry (religious, secular, and rímur) and history (Vatnsfjarðarannáll) and also translated religious works into Icelandic. Jón studied at the University of Copenhagen in the 1620s after graduating from Iceland's northern Latin school at Hólar. Upon his return to Iceland, Jón was schoolmaster at the Latin school at Skálholt in southern Iceland from 1632 to 1635, before becoming a minister with his own parish, first at Staður in Reykjanes (1635), and then at Vatnsfjörður, where he settled and established his family.

Magnús himself was also formally educated, attending the Latin school in the south at Skálholt from 1652 to 1653, but he did not remain long enough to complete his studies. His abilities in Latin and other languages like Danish and German are reflected in the library of texts he later had, which included translations from these languages, some of which he is thought to have done himself.

=== Family and relationships ===
On 6 September 1663, at the age of 24, Magnús married Ástríður Jónsdóttir, his 18-year-old second cousin. Their close kinship required a royal dispensation for the marriage to take place.

Both Magnús and Ástríður received substantial gifts of both fixed and moveable property from their families on the occasion of their marriage, including the farms of Ögur and Vigur from Magnús's father. Even so, after the wedding, Magnús lived with his bride and his in-laws for the first three years of the marriage. It was while living at Holt that Magnús translated Ævintýr af einum mýlnumanni ('Tale about a miller') into Icelandic from German in 1663, according to a note in the manuscript London, British Library Additional MS 4857. The couple moved away to Ögur not long after that in 1666. A few years later they set up their household in Vigur.

A letter dated 23 January 1672 is often cited as the earliest reference to Magnús and Ástríður living in Vigur, but they must have been there already three years earlier, if the 1669 dedication on the title page of the same manuscript just mentioned (London, British Library Additional MS 4857) is taken at face value.

==== Children ====
Magnús and Ástríður had two daughters together. The first, Þorbjörg, was born in 1667, and the second, Kristín, in 1672. Both girls grew up to be literate women who seem to have appreciated reading and learning, and they both came to be influential in the preservation of their father's library of manuscripts.

In 1696 Þorbjörg married Páll Jónsson Vídalín (1667–1727), who is best known as Árni Magnússon's associate, with whom the Icelandic census of 1703 was carried out. Being of the same age, the two had met at Hólar around 1684, when Páll was studying at the Latin school and Þorbjörg was studying needlework under the tutelage of her aunt Ragnheiður, who then was married to Bishop Gísli Þorláksson of Hólar. Páll would later work closely with the manuscript collector Árni Magnússon. After his father-in-law's death, Páll inherited both property and some of Magnús í Vigur's manuscripts. Some of these manuscripts in turn came, through Páll, to belong to Árni Magnússon.

Magnús í Vigur did not live to see his younger daughter Kristín marry Snæbjörn Pálsson (c. 1677–1767) in 1706. Their time together was short, as Kristín only lived until 1714, aged 42. Snæbjörn came to be known as Mála-Snæbjörn (lawsuit-Snæbjörn), due to the several cases he was involved in against various people, including, in 1720, Páll Vídalín.

==== Divorce ====
In addition to children with his wife Ástríður, Magnús was also father to an illegitimate child born in 1673, one year after Ástríður had given birth to their second daughter Kristín. After Magnús admitted to adultery with an unnamed woman working on the farm Vigur, Ástríður left Magnús and went to live with her father at Holt. With his help, she petitioned for a divorce from Bishop Brynjólfur Sveinsson (1605–1675) of Skalhólt, who was also her paternal grandfather's half-brother. Two letters were sent to him, dated 27 and 28 February 1674, just before the end of his time as bishop. Ástríður and Magnús were summoned to the court at the Althing in 1674 but it was still not yet settled. Ástríður wrote again to Brynjólfur in autumn 1674, and his reply of 12 April 1675, only four months before his death later that year, advised her not to return to Magnús. After this, the matter was taken up by Brynjólfur's successor, Bishop Þórður Þorláksson (1637–1697), and during his first visit to the Westfjords the case for divorce was considered and granted. Ástríður later lived at Mýri in nearby Dýrafjörður, eventually together with her daughter Kristín and son-in-law Snæbjörn. Ástríður died on 30 August 1719, at the age of 73.

After his relationship with Ástríður formally ended, Magnús had another child in 1681 with another mistress, Guðbjörg Jónsdóttir. Guðbjörg was then married to Jón Sigurðsson, a farmer who later worked at Skarð (one of Magnús Jónsson's farms, under the control of Ögur) and even at Vigur itself after Magnús's death. Magnús did not, however, publicly acknowledge his paternity of the child, named Sigurður, until 1686. Until then, the boy was considered to be Guðbjörg's son together with Jón Sigurðsson. When the truth was revealed, Magnús was fined and the record of this notes that the offence was Guðbjörg's first, and Magnús's second. Sigurður Magnússon only lived to his mid-twenties, almost certainly dying in the smallpox epidemic that broke out in 1707.

==== Remarriage ====
Soon after his affair with Guðbjörg was made known, Magnús settled on the idea of marrying a second time. He sought a royal dispensation to marry Sesselja Sæmundsdóttir (born 1673), whose father, Sæmundur Magnússon, was magistrate at Hóll in Bolungarvík. Sesselja was one of seven of Sæmundur's children with his second wife Solveig Jónsdóttir. The dispensation for the marriage was issued in Denmark by King Christian V on 27 April 1688, when Sesselja was only 15 years of age; permission must have been sought by Magnús at least a year earlier. The dispensation reached Iceland later and was read at the Althing on 30 June 1691. The following year, 1692, the two were married, Sesselja 19 years old, and Magnús, 55. The couple did not have any children, and this marriage also seems to have been troubled as Sesselja was living again with her family only a few years later. Her uncle Árni Magnússon (c. 1625–1698) of Hóll in Bolungarvík petitioned to take her into his care. After his death, Sesselja appears to have lived with her father again, with her brother Sigmundur (c. 1675–c. 1737) as her legal guardian.

== Patronage of manuscripts ==
At the time of his death, Magnús had amassed an extensive library of Icelandic and foreign texts from medieval tales and sagas of all literary genres, to modern works on geography and ethnography that were being printed in early modern Europe, to poetry composed by his own family members.

The manuscripts associated with Magnús Jónsson í Vigur are significant because the texts preserved in them are thought to represent a snapshot of the literature available in Iceland at the time, and to provide insight into the country's early modern literary landscape and manuscript production practices: it has been said of just one of the manuscripts commissioned by Magnús Jónsson (AM 148 8vo, the famous miscellany known as Kvæðabók úr Vigur), that it "shows as though in a cross-section the type of poetry, both ancient and new, thought to be most current in Iceland in the late 17th century".

Many of the manuscripts in Magnús's library were copied by one or more scribes who worked in his service. However, Magnús himself also copied texts in several of the manuscripts in his library. The manuscripts containing Magnús's own writing are listed here, and all of them now are housed in two institutions in Reykjavík, Iceland (those with the shelfmark "AM" are in the Árni Magnússon Institute for Icelandic Studies and those with the shelfmarks ÍB, ÍBR, and JS are in the National and University Library of Iceland):

- AM 284 4to
- AM 601 c 4to (rímur excerpts copied c. 1675–1700)
- Three letters to Jón Jónsson at Holt, dated 1662, 1663, and 1672 and preserved in the larger letter collection AM 1058 III 4to
- parts of AM 148 8vo (also known as Kvæðabók úr Vigur)
- ÍB 380 8vo
- ÍBR 5–6 fol. (also known as Vigrabók)
- parts of JS 43 4to
- JS 583 4to
- JS 385 8vo

The other manuscripts belonging to Magnús's library, but copied by other scribes, are housed in several different libraries today in addition to those in Reykjavík: these include the British Library in London, the Arnamagnæan Institute in Copenhagen, the Royal Library in Copenhagen, and the Royal Library in Stockholm.
