= Björn Jónsson á Skarðsá =

Icelandic farmer and statesman (1574–1655)

Björn Jónsson á Skarðsá (1574–1655) was a farmer and a member of the Icelandic Court of Legislature, characterised by Philip Lavender as 'an important figure on the Icelandic intellectual scene of his day'. He is best known as the author of Skarðsárannáll, a work in the annalistic tradition that spans the period from 1400 to Björn's own day and draws on a combination of oral and written sources.

== Life ==
Björn's father died when Björn was young, and for the twenty years from c. 1582 to 1602 he grew up in northern Iceland, at Reynistaður in Skagafjörður, in the care of one Sigurður Jónsson. There he must have received his education. From around 1602 he lived at Skarðsá, and in 1616 became a local lögréttumaður. Björn seems to have had a poor relationship with his local bishop, Guðbrandur Þorláksson of Hólar (c. 1542–1647), but got on better with his successors Þorlákur Skúlason (1597–1656) and Brynjólfur Sveinsson (1605–75), who served as patrons to Björn and during whose episcopates Björn wrote extensively on poetry (including a commentary on Egill Skallagrímsson's Höfuðlausn), history (including a chronicle of his local area), law, grammar, and mythology. He took an interest in riddles, not only composing a commentary on the medieval Icelandic Riddles of Gestumblindi but also a rímur cycle telling the story of Apollonius of Tyre, which includes a riddle-contest.
