= Brevis commentarius de Islandia =

1593 book by Arngrímur Jónsson

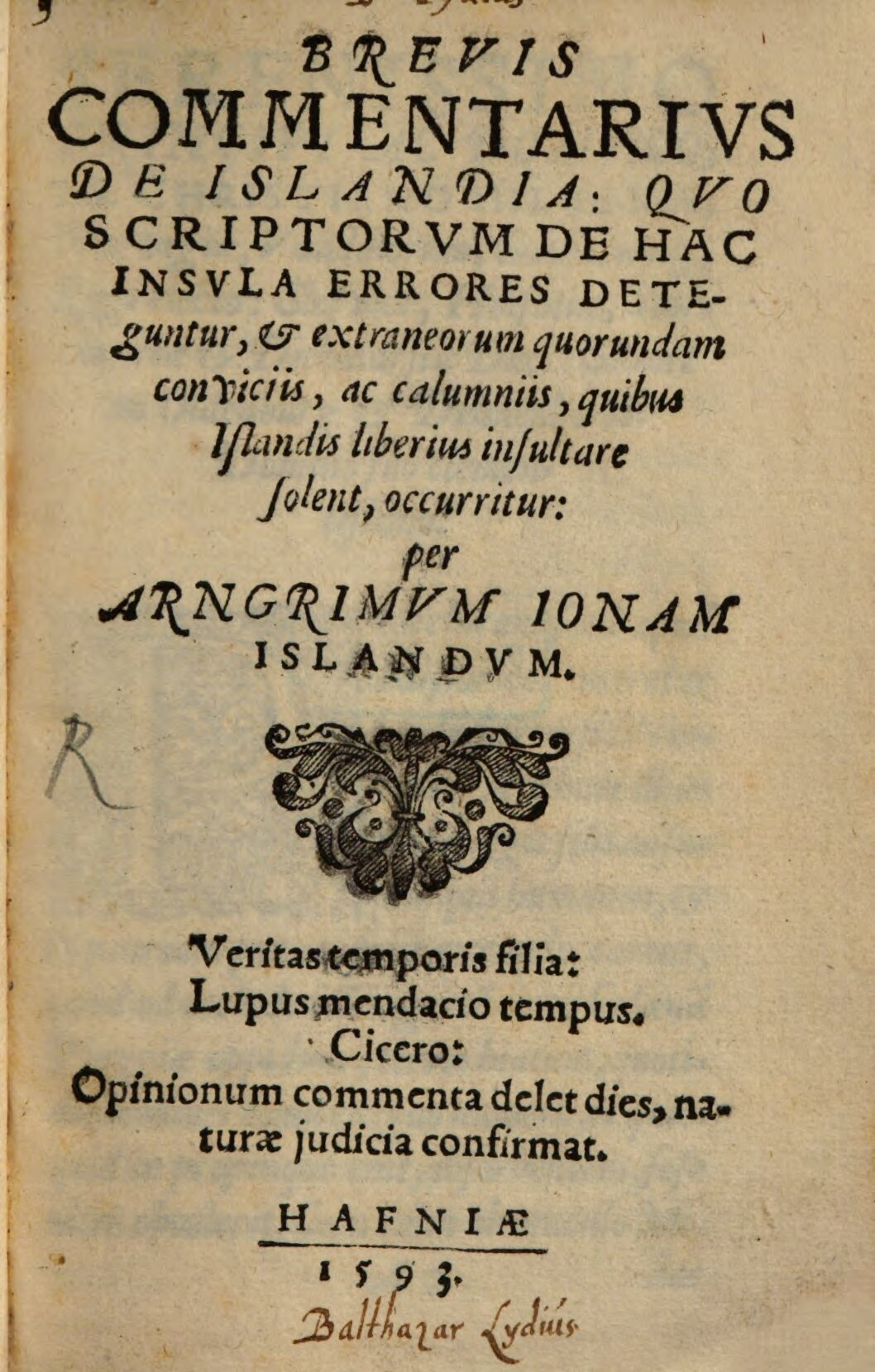
Title page of the 1593 edition of Brevis Commentarius de Islandia

Brevis commentarius de Islandia (lit. 'Brief Commentary on Iceland') is a book in Latin written and published in Copenhagen in 1593 by the Icelandic scholar Arngrímur Jónsson. The work aimed to debunk popular misconceptions about the people and geography of Iceland which circulated in printed works at the time. The extended title of the book, Brevis commentarius de Islandia, quo scriptorum de hac insida errores delegunltir et txtraneorum qiiorundam conviciis ac culumniis, quibus Islandis liberius insuharc solenl, occurritiir, accurately describes the purpose of the text as a work "in which the errors of writers of this island are debunked and the blatant accusations and lies of the scribes, which are usually more freely spoken of in Iceland, are met with."

Although the work brought Arngrímur notoriety as a scholar and quickly became popular among European scholars, it is not considered to have had a lasting impact in dispelling misconceptions about Iceland. Brevis commentarius de Islandia did, however, contribute to growing sentiments of Icelanders as a people. It also helped popularlize Icelandic sources and Sagas among historians, particularly in Denmark.

== Background ==
In Europe, Iceland had long since been perceived as a distant and primitive place. This idea was likely exacerbated by the nations geographic isolation and a general perception of Northern Europe as a violent region. The Landnámabók, a 12th-century manuscript, was perhaps the earliest work to attempt to correct the stereotypes that circulated about Iceland. The 14th-century version of the work, written by Melabók, specifically addresses the importance of counteracting these misconceptions and spreading the truth to foreigners.

As a colony of Denmark, Iceland was often perceived as inferior to Denmark, and indeed, standards of living suffered under Danish rule. Early Modern Danish scholars primarily associated Iceland with its ancient history, to the extent that it was perceived as a land frozen in the past. To Danish scholars, Iceland was a stronghold of Old Norse language and culture, that was considered primitive, uneducated, and a "backward other". From the 16th century, works about Iceland were published with greater frequency throughout Europe. These descriptions of Iceland often described it as the most primitive and exotic region in Europe.

Following a series of 15th-century policy shifts related to the Danish trade monopoly, merchants from Hamburg had close trading ties with Iceland. One such merchant, Göries Peerse, made several trips to Iceland in the 16th century. He wrote a sensational and somewhat slanderous poem about Icelandic geography and ethnography: Van Ysslandt (lit. 'About Iceland'). His poem reiterated a variety of misconceptions, including the claim that Icelanders frequently gave away their children.

== Contents ==
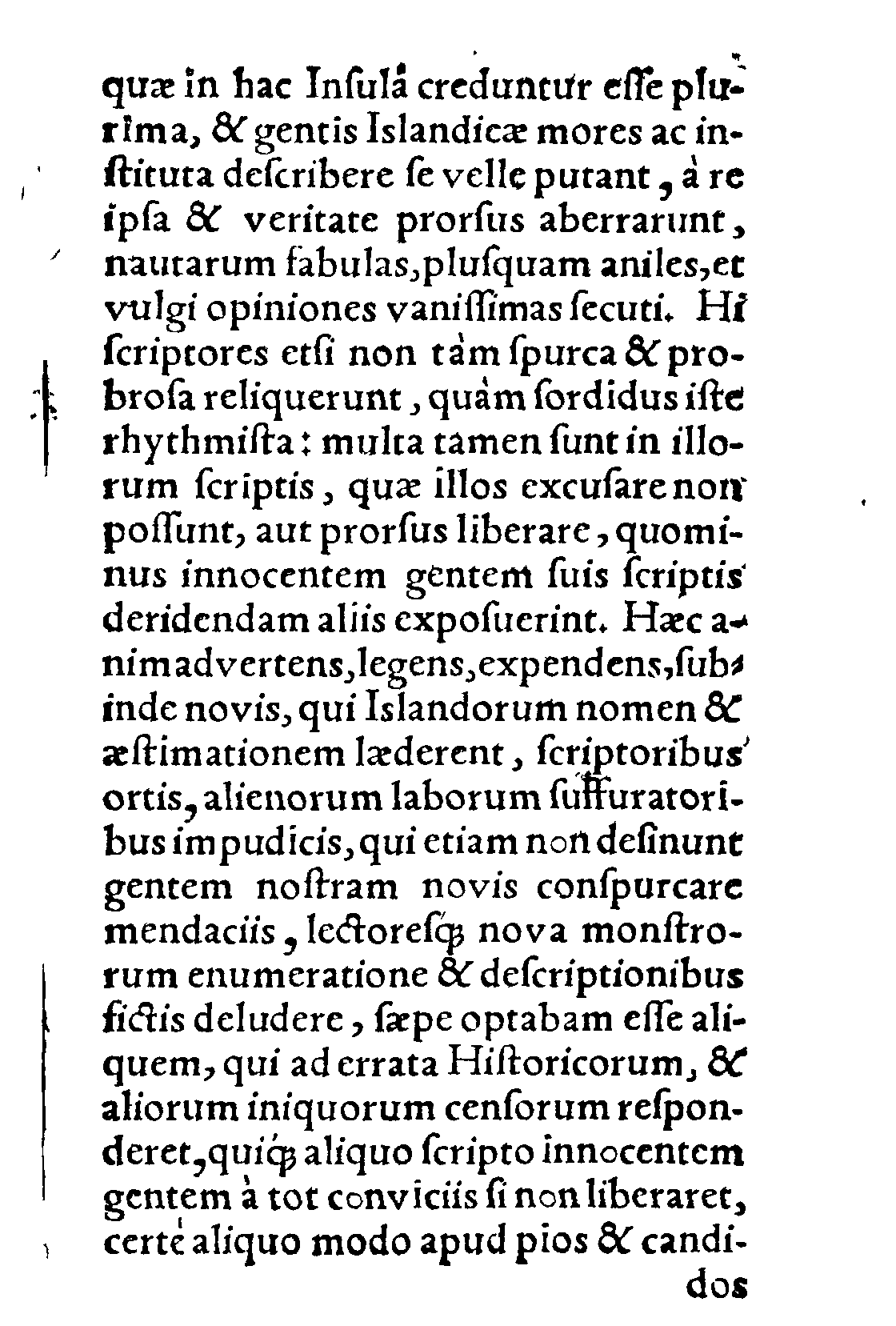
Page 15 of the first edition.

Brevis commentarius de Islandia is arranged in a series of refutations against arguments made by other scholars about Iceland. In particular, he criticises the works of Göries Peerse, Olaus Magnus, Albert Krantz, Jacob Ziegler, Gemma Frisius, Caspar Peucer, and Sebastian Münster's Cosmographia.

Arngrímur refutes the belief that Iceland was connected to the underworld through its volcanoes, particularly Hekla. This idea was popular at the time and persisted in some form well into the 19th century, as it features in Jules Verne's novel Journey to the Center of the Earth. Arngrímur compares Hekla to Mount Etna and emphasises the contradictory for Christian scholars to believe that hell is physically accessible from the realm of the living.

To refute the idea that Iceland is a barbaric place which believes in heretical gods, Arngrímur argues that Icelanders are more strongly Christian many other European people. He concludes that Iceland was converted to Christianity around 1000 C.E. and that the distance between the country and Rome meant that it retained a purer form of faith, removed from the power of the Catholic Church. He takes a historically deterministic view on the Icelandic Reformation by implying that the practice of early Christianity in Iceland was already closely aligned with protestantism.

== Publication and reception ==
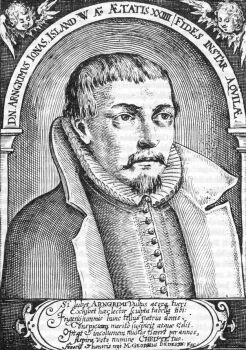
17th-century engraving of Arngrímur Jónsson.

Arngrímur wrote Brevis commentarius de Islandia at the request of Bishop Guðbrandur Þorláksson and it was first published in Copenhagen in the spring of 1593. In 1597, a contemporary of Arngrímur's, Oddur Einarsson, published his own description of Iceland: Qualiscunque descriptio Islandiæ or Íslandslýsing. It is likely that Einarsson, then the Bishop of Skálholt, had written his work before Arngrímur's, having completed it the 1580s but left it unpublished. The works of both authors sought to redress the reputation of their country and the popularity of their works demonstrate that information about Iceland was in demand at the time.

Brevis commentarius de Islandia established Arngrímur as an influential scholar in Copenhagen and gave him connections to royal historiographers in Denmark, including Arild Huitfeldt, Niels Krag, and Jon Jakobsen Venusinus. These scholarly connections encouraged him to produce his 1609 work on the history and language of Iceland, Crymogæa (lit. 'ice-land' in Greek), which is considered his magnum opus. Despite the popularity of his works on Iceland, however, Arngrímur's did not succeed in combating stereotypes that proliferated about his country. For example, the success of Brevis commentarius de Islandia, renewed interest in Göries Peerse's poem which was then reprinted in 1594. Many of the stereotypes Arngrímur had hoped to dispel were not completely dismissed until the 18th century with the publication of Niels Horrebow's The Natural History of Iceland.

His works were, however, influential in spreading the Sagas within Nordic region and fostering the identity of Icelanders as a people with their own history. As his first published work, Brevis commentarius de Islandia, in particular, is credited with renewing interest among Danish scholars in Icelandic sources. However, contemporary historians take issue with the work's historiography, as it often takes Old Norse texts at face value as historical sources.

The book quickly gained influence outside of Scandinavia following the publication of a translation in 1598 in the second edition of Richard Hakluyt's The Principal Navigations, Voyages, Traffiques and Discoveries of the English Nation. The fact that it was included can only confirm the importance of the Iceland fisheries for England.
