= Gísli Þorláksson =

17th Century Icelandic bishop

- Bishop of Holar
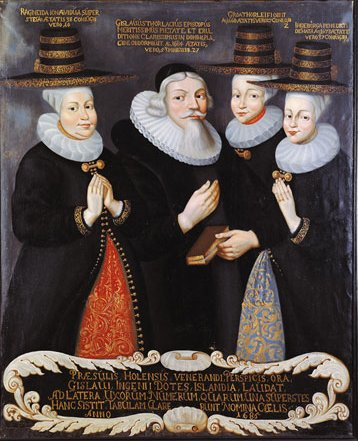
- Gísli Þorláksson and his wife Ragnheiður Jónsdóttir on the left. His two former wives, Gróa Þorleifsdóttir and Ingibjörg Benediktsdóttir, are on the right.
- Church: Church of Iceland
- Diocese: Hólar
- Appointed: 1657
- In office: 1657–1684
- Predecessor: Þorlákur Skúlason
- Successor: Jón Vigfússon

Personal details
- Born: 7 November 1631 Hólar, Iceland
- Died: 22 March 1684 (aged 52) Hólar, Iceland
- Spouse: Gróa Þorleifsdóttir; Ingibjörg Benediktsdóttir; Ragnheiður Jónsdóttir

Gísli Þorláksson (7 November 1631 – 22 March 1684) was an Icelandic bishop. He was a son of Þorlákur Skúlason and brother of Þórður Þorláksson.

== Early life ==
Gísli was the son of Þorlákur Skúlason, the bishop of Hólar, and Kristín Gísladóttir. He grew up in Hólar, graduating from Hólar College in 1649, after which he studied at the University of Copenhagen until 1651. After returning to Iceland, Gísli served as schoolmaster in Hólar.

== Bishop ==
Although he was barely 25 years old at the time, Gísli was named bishop of Hólar following his father's death in 1656 and was consecrated in Copenhagen in 1657. In large part, Gísli's appointment came from his family's reputation; his grandfather (Guðbrandur Þorláksson) and his father both preceded Gísli as bishop. Between Guðbrandur, Þorlákur, and Gísli, the family served as bishop of Hólar for 113 years.

Gísli was known for his interest in art, and he commissioned several pieces for the church, including the baptismal font carved by Guðmundur Guðmundsson í Bjarnastaðahlíð for the Hólar Cathedral. He wrote several religious works which were widely distributed, including Húspostilla 1–2 (1667–1670) and a translation of Luther's Small Catechism (1660). During his time as bishop, Gísli oversaw the publishing of about 40 books by the Hólar press; it was after his death that his brother Þórður, bishop of Skálholt, received permission to move the press to Skálholt.

== Personal life ==
Gísli married three times, but none of the marriages produced children. In 1658, he married Gróa Þorleifsdóttir (1633–1660); in 1664, Ingibjörg Benediktsdóttir (1636–1673); and in (1674): Ragnheiður Jónsdóttir (1646–1715). The 5,000 Icelandic króna banknote highlights Ragnheiður, but also includes images of Gísli, Gróa, and Ingibjörg on the note's face.

== Bibliography ==
- Páll Eggert Ólason: Íslenskar æviskrár II.
- Sigurður Líndal: Saga Íslands VII.

Preceded by Þorlákur Skúlason	Bishop of Hólar; 1657–1684	Succeeded by Jón Vigfússon
