= Ragnheiður Jónsdóttir =

Wife of Icelandic bishops (1646–1715)

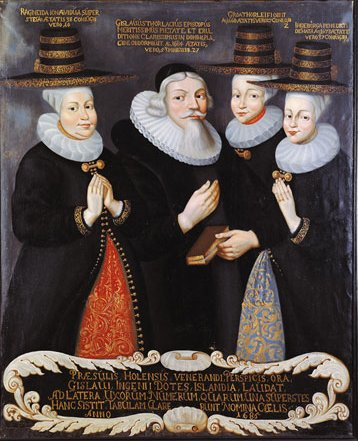
- A portrait of Ragnheiður (l.), her husband Gísli Þorláksson, and his first and second wives, Gróa Þorleifsdóttir and Ingibjörg Benediktsdóttir. Painted in Copenhagen, 1684.
- Born: 1646
- Died: 1715 (aged 68–69)
- Occupation(s): Bishop's wife, educator, textile artist

Ragnheiður Jónsdóttir (1646–1715) was a wealthy member of the powerful Svalbarðsætt family. She was married twice, each time to a Lutheran bishop of Hólar: Gísli Þorláksson (she was his third wife) and Einar Þorsteinsson. She survived both husbands and retired in 1685 to the farm of Gröf in Höfðaströnd, just south of the modern-day village of Hofsós, appointing her younger brother Oddur as ráðsmaður (household manager).

Ragnheiður was the daughter of Jón Arason (1606–1673) of Vatnsfjörður, a Lutheran priest and poet, and his wife Hólmfríður Sigurðardóttir (1617–1692). She was one of 12 children, nine of whom reached maturity. Her eldest brother was Magnús Jónsson í Vigur. Like Magnús, Ragnheiður was a patron of the arts, and her literary tastes are reflected in a surviving manuscript of poetry and hymns compiled for her in 1676 (cataloged in the Ny Kongelig Samling at the Royal Library in Copenhagen as "NKS 56 d 8vo"). After Gísli Þorláksson's death in 1684, Ragnheiður commissioned a large portrait of Gísli and herself, alongside his first two wives, Gróa Þorleifsdóttir (d. 1660) and Ingibjörg Benediktsdóttir (d. 1673).

Ragnheiður was an expert embroiderer. After moving to Hólar, she taught needlework to young women, and she continued to work as an educator for women in later life at Gröf. Ragnheiður and her Gísli were the patrons of Guðmundur Guðmundsson í Bjarnastaðahlíð (c. 1618–after 1703), one of the most skilled craftsman in 17th-century Iceland. They commissioned him to carve the baptismal font for the Hólar Cathedral in 1674. Accounts vary as to whether he also constructed the church at Gröf, but he is known to have carved the altar. The building, among the smallest houses of worship in Iceland, is located just south of Hofsós.

== 5000-króna banknote ==
Ragnheiður is on the front of the 5,000 Icelandic króna banknote and on the reverse she is shown instructing young women in embroidery. Introduced in 1986, it was the first Icelandic banknote to depict a woman. The Central Bank of Iceland chose Ragnheiður for the note to highlight Icelandic women and their contribution to Icelandic culture.
