= Þorlákur =

Þorlákur (Old Norse: Þorlákr) is an Icelandic given name, meaning "game of Thor". Notable people with this name include:

- Þorlákur Runólfsson (1086–1133), Icelandic bishop
- Þorlákur helgi Þórhallsson (1133–1193), Icelandic bishop and saint
- Þorlákur Narfason (died 1303), Icelandic lawman
- Þorlákur Loftsson (died 1354), Icelandic abbot
- Þorlákur Skúlason (1597–1656), Icelandic bishop
- Þorlákur Thorlacius Þórðarson (1675–1697), schoolmaster in Skálholt
