= Helga Aradóttir =

Icelandic noblewoman (1538–1614)

- Born: c. 1538
- Died: 1614
- Known for: Relationship with Staðarhóls-Páll Jónsson
- Spouse: Staðarhóls-Páll Jónsson (1558–1598)
- Children: Ragnheiður Pálsdóttir, Péter Pálsson, Elín Pálsdóttir
- Parent(s): Ari Jónsson, Halldóra Þorleifsdóttir
- Relatives: Jón Arason (grandfather)

Helga Aradóttir (c. 1538–1614) was an Icelandic noblewoman in the 16th century and housewife in Staðarhóll in Saurbær and Reykhólar. She was married to Staðarhóls-Páll Jónsson (Páll Jónsson of Staðarhóll), and she is mostly remembered for their tempestuous relationship. Helga was the daughter of lawyer Ari Jónsson (Bishop Jón Arason's son) and his wife Halldóra Þorleifsdóttir (daughter of Þorleifur Grímsson, the sýslumaður of Möðurvellir in Eyjafjörður).

== Family ==
After Helga's father was executed in 1550, she was raised by her aunt, Þórunn Jónsdóttir of Grund. Helga was said to be domineering, unruly, and temperamental, and reportedly the entire household in Grund celebrated when she left.

Páll Jónsson from Svalbarð in Eyjafjörður was just a few years old than Helga and they became infatuated with each other as teenagers. Páll proposed to her, but her grandfather Þorleifur vetoed it. However, Páll was set on marrying Helga and wrote passionate love poems to her. One of them begins with the couplet "I saw in a certain garden/an exceedingly enchanting flower".

Páll had the support of Reverend Sigurður Jónsson of Grenjaðarstaður, Helga's uncle. She herself said that she wanted to marry him if others considered him to be a fitting match; she did not want to marry down. People were appointed to the court from Skriða in Hörgárdalur in 1556, and they ruled that Helga and Páll were of equal social and economic standing because he had acquired Staðarhólar in Saurbær significantly improving his finances, yet she still had considerably more assets. Their wedding took place in Grund right after the new year in 1558. There are a many tales about how great their love was and they allegedly did not leave their bed for weeks after the wedding. However, the passion cooled down not long after.

== Relationship with Páll ==
In their first few together, the young couple lived in the farm in Eyrarland in Eyjafjörður and Einarstaðir in Reykjadalur valley. They then moved west to Staðarhóll around 1562. They lived there until 1570 before moving to Reykjólar, which Páll also owned. By this time, their relationship had started to grow difficult, as they were both very strong-willed, arrogant, and domineering. Helga wanted to be in charge of the assets that she brought to the marriage, however Páll, did not agree. He was also fond of drink, verbally abusive, and foul-mouthed and spoke harshly when they had disagreements. Sources say that one time, when she threatened to leave him, he wrote the following:

If, poor thing, you tire of walking,

I will give you a horse.
If I terminate our long relationship,
I trust it's for the best.
If you have tattered shoes,
then you shall receive new skins.
Walk harshly upon the stony ground
and gape up at the clouds
with your yarn mittens and bandanna,
skirt strap, and walking stick.
Head north to Gýgjarfoss falls
and there plunge into the depths.
Sink to the bottom like lead

and never come back up.

In 1578, they separated, which very uncommon at the time, though Helga was still sometimes with Páll. In 1590, she went to stay with their daughter Elín and likely stayed there from then on. The next year, Páll summoned her to court, levying various accusations against her including no longer cohabitatating with him, desertion of the home, and financial expenditures: "she has been headstrong, competitive, and disobedient, and she has brought these outrageous accusations upon herself". The issue was referred to the Alþingi, but they did not take it up until 1594. The legislature did not consider the case to be legally ready since Helga was not summoned, nor was any representative called for her. Bishop Oddur Einarsson stood against Páll and he said that Páll was involved in this complaint in contravention of his relatives' will, which shocked everyone. Páll then wrote the bishop a letter, protesting this and saying it was not right that his children and elders, like Reverend Sigurður Jónsson of Grenjaðarstaður and Þórunn of Grund, were considered wiser than he was and he would not be seeking further counsel from them.

Páll wanted to divorce Helga because he had fallen in love with Halldóra Guðbrandsdóttir, whose father was Bishop Guðbrandur Þorláksson of Hólar, and intended to marry her. However, Halldóra was around 40 years younger than he was, and she had no interest in the match.

Helga and Páll's children were:

- Ragnheiður, who initially married the sýslumaður Gissur Þorláksson of Núpur and later married the priest Sveinn Símonarson of Holt in Önundarfjörður. Ragnheiður was also the mother of Bishop Brynjólfur Sveinsson.
- Péter, sýslumaður of Staðarhóll
- Elín, wife of Björn Benediktsson, sýslumaður of Munkaþverá
