= Solveig Lára Guðmundsdóttir =

21st-century Icelandic bishop

The Right Reverend Solveig Lára Guðmundsdóttir
- Bishop of Hólar
- Church: Church of Iceland
- Diocese: Hólar
- Elected: 2012
- In office: 2012–2022
- Predecessor: Jón Aðalsteinn Baldvinsson
- Successor: Gísli Gunnarsson

Orders
- Ordination: 12 June 1983
- Consecration: 12 August 2012 by Agnes M. Sigurðardóttir

Personal details
- Born: 1956 (age 69–70)
- Spouse: Gylfi Jonsson
- Children: 4
- Education: University of Iceland

Solveig Lára Guðmundsdóttir (born 1956) is an Icelandic prelate who served as the Bishop of Hólar from 2012 to 2022.

== Biography ==
Solveig Lára completed a diploma in theology in 1983 and has graduated in Christian reflection and psychology in Germany in 1999 and in serving leadership and leadership training for women by the Lutheran World Federation in 2010. She became a deputy clergyman in Bústaðapakkarak in 1983, became a parish priest at Seltjarnarnes in 1986 and a parish priest at Möðruvöllum in Hörgárdalur in 2000. Solveig Lára is married to Gylfi Jónsson. They have four children and three grandchildren.

== Bishop ==
Solveig Lára was elected bishop with 96 votes compared with 70 for her contender Kristján Björnsson. She was consecrated bishop on 12 August 2012 in Hólar Cathedral by the Bishop of Iceland Agnes M. Sigurðardóttir. She was installed as bishop on 1 September. She succeeded Jón Aðalsteinn Baldvinsson as Bishop of Hólar and suffragan to the Bishop of Iceland in the Diocese of Iceland. She was the second woman to be consecrated bishop in Iceland.

Preceded by Jón Aðalsteinn Baldvinsson	Bishop of Hólar; 2012–present	Incumbent
