= Ólafur Hjaltason =

First Lutheran bishop of Hólar, Iceland

- Bishop of Holar
- Church: Church of Iceland
- Diocese: Hólar
- Appointed: 1551
- In office: 1551–1569
- Predecessor: Jón Arason
- Successor: Guðbrandur Þorláksson

Personal details
- Born: c. 1491 Hólar, Iceland
- Died: 9 January 1569 Hólar, Iceland

Ólafur Hjaltason (c. 1491 – 9 January 1569) was bishop of Hólar from 1552 until his death. He was the first Lutheran bishop of Holar.

== Early life ==
Ólafur's father was Hjalti Arnkelsson, a carpenter in Hólar. His date of birth is uncertain with some sources pointing to 1481 and 1484, but others centering on 1491 or 1492. Ólafur grew up in Hólar, studied in Bergen, Norway, and became a priest around 1517. Shortly afterwards he was granted a post at Vesturhópshólar before serving in Húnaþing from 1527 to 1532.

== The Reformation ==
After 1532, Ólafur came to the Hólar Cathedral where he gained the esteem of Bishop Jón Arason. He was one of the three men who were tasked by Jón to travel to Denmark in 1542 negotiate before King Christian III whether Iceland would remain Catholic or become Lutheran. During his stay in Copenhagen, Ólafur was swayed for the Reformation but he did not break with the Catholic leader Jón initially.

Over the years, Ólafur became more disenchanted with the Catholic Church and more outspoken in favor of Luther's teaching, causing Jón to banish him in 1549. Ólafur fled to Copenhagen and received the approval of the king to return to Iceland in 1551 to assume the role of bishop of Hólar, a position he held until his death in 1569.

As the first Lutheran bishop, Ólafur focused on training priests in the new order of service and tenets of Lutheranism. To this end, he continued Hólar's printing activities, publishing several books including translations of several hymns into Icelandic.

== Personal life ==
Ólafur married the much younger woman Sigríður Sigurðardóttir. They had no children together; however, Ólafur fathered at least two children out of wedlock, Hallfríður Ólafsdóttir and Hjalti Ólafsson (d. 1588), who also became a priest.

Preceded by Jón Arason	Bishop of Hólar; 1552–1569	Succeeded by Guðbrandur Þorláksson
