= Four Hang; Two Point the Way =

Four Hang; Two Point the Way is the name given by the folklorist Archer Taylor to a traditional riddle-type noted for its wide international distribution. The most common solution is 'cow', and in Taylor's view 'we can probably infer that a cow was the original answer'.

== Research ==
The seminal study of this riddle type, published in 1918–20, was by Antti Aarne. Archer Taylor surveyed subsequent work and offered new contributions in 1951.

== Form ==
In Taylor's view,

an essential element in the conception seems to be the contrast of pointing up and pointing down [...] The characteristic features of this pattern are the naming of the members of an animal and the referring to their numbers. The members are described in terms of their functions, and the functions may be identified—and often are identified—by periphrases that are intentionally confusing [...] the wit of the pattern turns on the inventing of strange, yet not wholly incomprehensible, terms for the ears, horns, eyes, feet, or other members of the creature that the riddler is describing.

As well as the cow, attested solutions include numerous other animals, the sun and the moon, and various man-made objects.

== Examples ==
What appears to be the earliest vernacular attestation of the riddle appears in the Riddles of Gestumblindi, a riddle-contest included in the probably thirteenth-century Old Norse Hervarar saga ok Heiðreks:

Fjórir hanga,
fjórir ganga,
tveir veg vísa,
tveir hundum varða,
einn eptir drallar
ok jafnan heldr saurugr.
Heiðrekr konungr,
hyggðu at gátu!

Four are hanging,
Four are walking,
Two point the way out,
Two ward the dogs off,
One ever dirty
Dangles behind it.
This riddle ponder
O prince Heidrek!

The cow has four udders, four legs, two horns, two back legs, and one tail.

One Mongolian instance runs 'four high and slow, high and slow; five younger sisters; two wobbling right and left; you poor one alone', the answer to which is 'a camel's four legs, head and legs, humps, and tail'.
