= Þjalar-Jóns saga =

Medieval Icelandic saga

Þjalar-Jóns saga ("the saga of Þjálar-Jón" or "Jón of the file"), also known as Saga Jóns Svipdagssonar ok Eireks forvitna ("the saga of Jón Svipdagsson and Eirekur the Curious") is a medieval Icelandic saga defined variously as a romance-saga and a legendary saga. The earliest manuscript, Holm. perg. 6 4to, dates from around the first quarter of the fifteenth century, and the saga is thought to be from the fourteenth century.

The saga is particularly noteworthy because chapter 3 contains skaldic verse, which "is surely unique among fornaldarsögur and riddarasögur", and also contains one of the only medieval Scandinavian riddles attested outside Heiðreks saga.

== Summary and riddle ==
Eirekr, son of King Vilhjálmr of Valland (today's Normandy), falls in love with a maiden whose image Gestr, a mysterious stranger at his father's court, had shown him. Gestr is in reality Jón, son of Jarl Svipdagr, whom Jarl Róðbert has slain. Prince Eirekr and Jón embark on a search for the maiden named Marsilia who is actually Jón's sister. The jarl plans to marry Marsilia. Jón and Eirekr succeed in rescuing Marsilia and her mother from captivity. Eirekr marries Marsilia and succeeds his father as king, while Jón marries a princess of Hólmgarðr (today's Novgorod).

A fuller summary is provided by White.

Jarl Róðbert, who is the villain of the saga, also features as a villain in Konráðs saga keisarasonar, making the sagas an interesting example of intertextual relationships within the romance-saga corpus.

As edited by White and translated by Lavender, the riddle included in the saga runs:

“Ek vilda reyna svinnu þína, Gestr, því settumst ek í sæti þitt; eða hvat heitir hringrinn?” Gestr svarar: “Af sindri ok seimi var sægrími gjörr, eða hvat er þetta?” Konungsson svarar: “Þat er sindr harðast, er leikr um hjarta manns, hugarangr allmikit, en rautt gull er seimr, en lýsigull er sægrími; en hringrinn er gjörr í minning þess manns, er hugarangr hefir haft, at hann skuli því oftar minnast sinna harma, er hann sér hann fyrir augum sér, ok kalla ek hann Gáinn.”

"I wanted to put your nature to the test, Gestur, and for that reason I sat in your chair. So what’s the ring called?" Gestur answers: "From iron-slag and gilt thread Sægrímir was made. So what is it?" The prince answers: "The hardest of iron-slags is that which plays upon the heart of a man, in other words great sorrow. Gilt thread is red gold, and Sægrímir is white gold. And the ring has been made as a memento for the man who has experienced great sorrow, so that he shall often think upon his sorrows when he looks at it, and I name it Gáinn."

Lavender suggests that the riddle is in fact in some variety of eddaic verse.

== Manuscripts ==
The Stories for All Time project and Philip Lavender list the following 47 surviving manuscripts of the saga:

- Den Arnamagnæanske Samling, Copenhagen: AM 179 folio;
- Stofnun Árna Magnússonar í íslenskum fræðum, Reykjavík: AM 181 l folio; AM 181 m folio; AM 537 4to and AM 582 4to (originally from the same MS); AM 576 b 4to (excerpt/summary); AM 576 c 4to (excerpt/summary); AM 585 e 4to;
- Arnamagnaean Collection, Reykjavík: SÁM 6;
- British Library, London: BL Add. 4863;
- Harvard University, Houghton Library, Cambridge, MA: Icel. MS. 32;
- Johns Hopkins University, Baltimore: Nikulás Ottenson 9;
- Det Kongelige Bibliotek, Copenhagen: Kall 614 4to; NKS 1144 folio (excerpt/summary);
- Kungliga biblioteket, Stockholm: Engestr. B. III. 1. 20.; Papp. 4to nr 16; Papp. 4to nr 32; Papp. 8vo nr 8; Papp. folio nr 102; Papp. folio nr 98 (Swedish translation); Perg. 4to nr 6;
- Landsbókasafn Íslands, Reykjavík: ÍB 277 4to; ÍB 185 8vo; ÍBR 47 4to; JS 8 folio; JS 27 folio; JS 623 4to; JS 635 4to; JS 641 4to; JS 407 8vo; Lbs 644 4to; Lbs 1331 4to; Lbs 1509 4to; Lbs 1629 4to; Lbs 2462 4to; Lbs 3625 4to; Lbs 1687 8vo; Lbs 1996 8vo; Lbs 2207 8vo; Lbs 2497 8vo; Lbs 4370 8vo; Lbs 4492 8vo; Lbs 4813 8vo;
- Private collections: Böðvar Kvaran 11 4to;
- Riksarkivet, Stockholm: Säfstaholmssamlingen I Papp. 3;
- Byggðasafnið á Skógum: Skógar (no shelfmark);
- University Library, Yale, New Haven, CT: MS Z 113.81

== Reception ==
The saga is known to have been the basis for five different versifications in the rímur-form. One, from the late medieval or early modern period, is anonmyous. The remaining four were by Hjörleifur Þórðarson, Guðmundur Jónsson í Hrútshúsum, Árni Þorklesson along with Guðmundur Jónsson í Grímsey (in collaboration), and Guðlaugur Magnússon.

== Editions and translations ==
- Sagan af Þjalar-Jóni, ed. by Gunnlaugur Þórðarson, 2nd edn (Reykjavík: Jón Helgason, 1907) (first edn Reykjavík, 1857)
- Þjalar Jóns saga. Dámusta saga, ed. by Louisa Fredrika Tan-Haverhorst (Haarlem: H. D. Tjeenk Willink & zoon, 1939) [diss. Universiteit Leiden]
- Romances: Perg 4:0 nr. 6 in the Royal Library, Stockholm, ed. by Desmond Slay, Early Icelandic Manuscripts in Facsimile (Copenhagen: Rosenkilde og Bagger, 1972) [facsimile of earliest MS]
- 'Þjalar-Jóns saga', trans. by Philip Lavender, Leeds Studies in English, n.s. 46 (2015), 73-113 [English translation]
- Cecilia White, 'Þjalar-Jóns saga: The Icelandic Text with an English Translation, Introduction and Notes' (unpublished MA Thesis, University of Iceland, 2016).
