= What the Rose did to the Cypress =

Persian fairy tale

Gul o Sanaubar is a Persian fairy tale, that had been translated to various languags and even included in the One Thousand and One Nights.

== Alternate names ==
Andrew Lang included the tale with the name "What the Rose did to the Cypress" in The Brown Fairy Book (1904), with the note "Translated from two Persian MSS. in the possession of the British Museum and the India Office, and adapted, with some reservations, by Annette S. Beveridge."

The story is alternatively named Rose and Cypress, Gul o Sanaubar, Qissa Gul-o-Sanaubar or What the Rose did to the Pine. Author Garcin de Tassy translated it into French as Rose & Cyprès, and Felix Liebrecht into German, as Rose und Cypresse.

== Synopsis ==
A king has three sons. When the eldest goes hunting, he becomes lost in the desert and meets a faqir who tells him of a princess whose hand may only be won by answering the riddle, “What did the rose do to the cypress?” The faqir explains that his own seven sons attempted the challenge and were executed for failing. Inspired, the prince travels to the princess’s city, fails to answer the riddle, and is executed. The second brother follows and meets the same fate.

The youngest brother then sets out. Upon seeing his brothers’ severed heads displayed at the city gates, he conceals his identity and lodges in a nearby village. Disguised, he enters the city and gains access to the princess’s garden, where he feigns madness and earns her protection. A maid named Dil-aram falls in love with him and reveals that an African from Waq of the Caucasus once provided the princess with the answer to the riddle. The prince undertakes a perilous journey to Waq, encountering sorceresses, demons, enchanted lands, and magical helpers. He is transformed into a deer and later restored, aided by a lion-king, rescues a princess from the Castle of Clashing Swords, and saves the young of the Simurgh by killing a dragon. In gratitude, the Simurgh carries him to Waq.

There, the king of Waq reveals that he himself is the cypress and his wife the rose. The riddle refers to her betrayal after their marriage, which had been arranged by the peris. The king had killed her lover, whose surviving companion later brought the riddle to the princess. Condemned to execution, the prince escapes by summoning the Simurgh and returns to the princess’s city, where he exposes the truth with the African’s testimony. He refuses to marry the princess, instead taking her captive and arranging for the burial of his brothers. He returns home, marries Dil-aram, the rescued princess, the woman who freed him from enchantment, and finally the princess herself, and lives peacefully with his four wives.

== Variants ==
Orientalist Garcin de Tassy himself noted, in an 1868 publication, that he knew at least six translations of the story: one from a man named "Nem Chand" or "Prem Chand", which he translated in 1860, in Revue orientale et américaine; another supposedly translated from Persian; at least two versions penned by escrivener Ahmad Ali.

Variants also exist in Armenia, Turkestan and one was collected by Haxthausen.

Scholars Ulrich Marzolph and Richard van Leewen point that the Persian tale is parallel to the story The Splendid Tale of Prince Diamond, in the Mardrus translation of The Arabian Nights.

Linguist Adolf Dirr published a Caucasian variant titled Von Balai und von Boti.

In a Georgian variant, Gulambara and Sulambara, after a prince is banished by his father and meets a mysterious yet helpful boy in his wanderings, both reach a city. One day, the prince goes out and sees a tower with a row of spiked heads nearby. The prince asks the meaning of a gruesome sight: the princess asks any potential suitor a riddle, "Who are Gulambara and Sulambara?". The prince knows Gulambara and Sulambara are names of flowers, but he is given a chance to answer correctly.

== Origins and interpretation ==
Professor Mahomed-Nuri Osmanovich Osmanov translated the word "Gul" as 'rose, flower', and "Sanaubar" as 'cypress'.

The tale is described as having "Hindustani" origin, and scholar Christine Goldberg, in her book Turandot's Sisters, indicated that it belongs to a literary tradition that migrated to Europe in the Middle Ages. The story is also said to be famous in Iran.

== Analysis ==
The tale of a princess who challenges her suitors with deadly riddles is similar to the story of Turandot. As such, it belongs in a series of folktales involving riddles.

The heroic prince helping the mythical creature and it repaying the favour is a motif that echoes the Roman fable of Androcles and the Lion.

Angelo de Gubernatis analysed the motif of the rose and the cypress of the story, postulating that the cypress is a phallic symbol or representative of the male prince, and the rose the symbol of the female beloved.

== Adaptations ==
A number of films have been made in India based on the fable. These include: Gul Sanobar (1928) silent film by Homi Master, Gul Sanobar (1934) remade in sound by Homi Master, Gul Sanobar (1953) by Aspi Irani.

Gul Sanobar, an Indian television series based on the legend was aired by the national public broadcaster Doordarshan on DD National in the early 2000s.

== See also ==
- Turandot
- Riddle tales

== Bibliography ==
- Goldberg, Christine. Turandot's Sisters: A Study of the Folktale AT 851. Garland Folklore Library, 7. New York and London: Routledge 2019. [New York: Garland, 1993].
- Krappe, A. Haggerty. "Arthur and Gorlagon." Speculum 8, no. 2 (1933): 209-22. doi:10.2307/2846751.
- Lecoy, Félix. "Un épisode du Protheselaus et le conte du mari trompé". In: Romania, tome 76 n°304, 1955. pp. 477–518. [DOI: https://doi.org/10.3406/roma.1955.3478] www.persee.fr/doc/roma_0035-8029_1955_num_76_304_3478
- Perrin, J.-M. "L'afghon, dialecte indo-aryen parlé au Turkestan (à propos d'un livre récent de I. M. Oranski)". In: Bulletin de l'École Française d'Extrême-Orient. Tome 52 N°1, 1964. pp. 173–181. [DOI: https://doi.org/10.3406/befeo.1964.1594] www.persee.fr/doc/befeo_0336-1519_1964_num_52_1_1594
- Pierer's Universal-Lexikon, Band 8. Altenburg. 1859. pp. 387–391
