= Hjörleifur Þórðarson =

Icelandic churchman (1695–1786)

The Reverend Hjörleifur Þórðarson of Valþjófsstaðir (1695–1786) was an Icelandic pastor and scholar. He composed literature on both secular and religious themes, including composing verse on Classical gods in Latin, translating the Passíusálmar of Hallgrímur Pétursson into Latin hexametrical verse, and composing an Icelandic-language rímur based on the medieval Þjalar-Jóns saga.
