= Halldór Ásmundsson =

17th century Icelandic printer

Halldór Ásmundsson (c. 1600 – 1667/1668) was a 17th-century Icelandic printer, responsible for the only printing press in Iceland from 1634 to 1666. Halldór was an apprentice of the Hólar printer Brandur Jónsson. He moved to Germany and worked as a printer in Danzig for many years before returning to Iceland to lead the Hólar press, following the death of Brandur. Halldór oversaw the Hólar press until shortly before he died "at an advanced age" at which point he was succeeded by the Dane Henrik Krúse.

On 16 June 1644, Halldór completed the printing of the second translation of The Bible in Icelandic, known as Þorláksbiblía as it was prepared under the direction of Bishop Þorlákur Skúlason.
