= Hólmfríður Sigurðardóttir =

17th-century Icelandic noblewoman

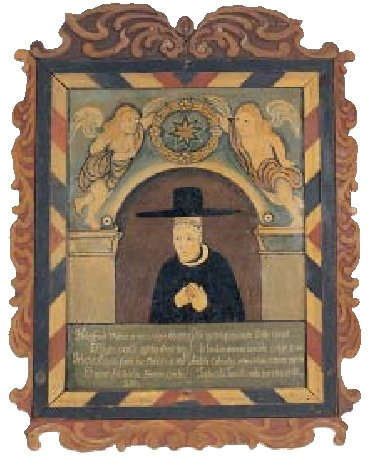
- Painting of Hólmfríður Sigurðardóttir by Reverend Jón Guðmunsson, thought to be painted between 1690 and 1962
- Born: January 9, 1617
- Died: April 25, 1692 (aged 75)
- Spouse: Jón Arason of Vatnsfjörður
- Children: Magnús digri Jónsson, Helga Jónsdóttir (the elder), Ragnheiður Jónsdóttir (the elder), Guðbrandur Jónsson, Sigurður Jónssón, Regnheiður Jónsdottir (the younger), Oddur digri Jónsson, Anna digra Jónsdóttir, Ari Jónsson
- Parent(s): Sigurður Oddson, Þórunn ríka ("the rich") Jónsdóttir, Magnús Arason (stepfather)

Hólmfríður Sigurðardóttir (January 9, 1617 – April 25, 1692) was the wife of a provost in Vatnsfjörður, Iceland during the 17th century. Her parents were Sigurður Oddson of Hróarsholt in Flói (son of Bishop Oddur Einarsson) and his wife Þórunn ríka ("the rich") Jónsdóttir. Sigurður drowned the same year that Hólmfríður was born; her mother remarried to Magnús Arason, sýslumaður of Reykhólar, and she raised Hólmfríður there.

== Family ==
In 1636, Hólmfríður married the provost of Vatnsfjörður, Jón Arason, who was the younger brother of her stepfather Magnús. They lived in Vatnsfjörður until Jón died in 1673. She then moved to Hólar where her daughter Ragnheiður lived and later to Laufás where her daughter Helga lived.

Hólmfríður and Jón's children were:

- Magnús digri ("the stout"), a farmer in Vigur and Ögur
- Helga the elder, the wife of a priest in Laufás
- Ragnheiður the elder, a housewife in Flatey
- Guðbrandur, a provost in Vatnsfjörður
- Sigurður, a provost in Holt in Önundarfjörður
- Ragnheiður the younger, the wife of a bishop in Hólar
- Oddur digri ("the stout"), the manager of the Reynistaður Abbey
- Anna digra ("the stout"), the wife of a priest in Breiðabólsstaður in Vesturhóp
- Ari, a farmer in Sakka in Svarfaðardalur valley.

== Legacy ==
Jón Ólafsson of Grunnavík said the following of Hólmfríður: "She was the type of person to, as the story goes, have someone fetch gold dye from abraod for her hairgold, it is said. And some maid bathed her if she was at all dirtied and she was the type to say, when she first found herself pregnant: 'Should I then have to say: ow?' For these people, Vatnsfjörður haughtiness is so named."

A painting of Hólmfríður that is believed to have been commissioned by Helga to memorialize her mother is preserved in the Laufás church.
