= Kristín Guðbrandsdóttir =

Icelandic noblewoman (1574–1652)

- Born: 1574
- Died: October 1, 1652
- Spouse: Ari Magnússon
- Children: Magnús Arason, Þorlákur Arason, Halldóra Aradóttir, Helga Aradóttir, and Jón Arason
- Parent(s): Guðbrandur Þorláksson and Halldóra Árnadóttir

Kristín Guðbrandsdóttir (1574 – October 1, 1652) was an Icelandic noblewoman in the 16th and 17th centuries. She was married to the farmer Ari Magnússon and worked as a housewife in Ögur in Ísafjarðardjúp, Iceland.

== Biography ==
Kristín was the daughter of Bishop Guðbrandur Þorláksson of Hólar and his wife Halldóra Árnadóttir. In late summer 1594, Ari of Ögur (who was at the time one of Iceland's most prominent chieftains and had inherited significant wealth upon his father's death that spring) went to Hólar with a great entourage to ask Kristín to marry him. Bishop Guðbrandur would have been reluctant to agree to the marriage because he had a dispute with Ari's uncle, the lawyer Jón Jónsson. Ari allegedly then rode away, but Kristín liked what she saw of him from the window of the bishop's residence. When her father told her what Ari's business was, she was able to persuade him to send for the suitor again. Their marriage settlement took place in Hólar on September 22, 1594. Upon this occasion, Ari promised Guðbrandur that he would support and advocate for his (Bishop Guðbrandur's) children both at home and abroad, to the best of his ability, to any and all. Ari is not, however, thought to have carried out this promise very well.

Kristín was supposedly a woman of high distinction. She and Ari lived their entire lives in Ögur, and they were married for nearly 60 years until they died ten days apart in 1652. They had five children:

- Magnús Arason, sýslumaður of Reykhólar
- Þorlákur Arason, a farmer in Súðavík
- Halldóra Aradóttir, a housewife in Þingeyrar
- Helga Aradóttir, who died unmarried
- Jón Arason, a provost in Vatnsfjörður

On November 25, 1632, Kristín drafted a will consisting of a lot of silver jewelry and needlework. A year later, she gave her son Þorlákur Arason her own books, worth 30 hundreds, that she had had at Hólar and inherited from her father, Bishop Guðbrandur, who had died a few years prior.
