= Arngrímur Jónsson =

Icelandic scholar and apologist (1568–1648)

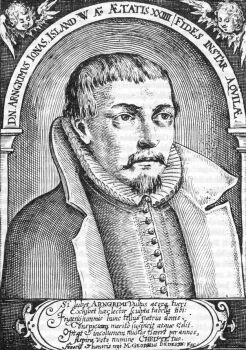
- Arngrímur Jónsson the Learned
- Born: 1568; Víðidalur, Iceland
- Died: 27 June 1648 (aged 79–80); Melstaður, Vestur-Húnavatnssýsla

Arngrímur Jónsson the Learned (Icelandic: Arngrímur Jónsson hinn lærði; 1568 – 27 June 1648) was an Icelandic scholar and a Christian apologist. His father was Jón Jónsson, who died in 1591. Arngrímur studied in Copenhagen, completing his studies in 1589 and taking up a position back in Iceland as rector of the Latin school at the episcopal seat of Hólar in the same year.

In 1593 he published Brevis commentarius de Islandia, a "Defense of Iceland" in Latin, in which he criticized the works of numerous authors who had written about the people and the country of Iceland. His main target was a poem by Gories Peerse, a merchant who had written an entertaining and somewhat slanderous poem about Icelandic geography and ethnography. Arngrímur also, however, criticized substantial works such as Cosmographia universalis of the German scholar Sebastian Münster.

The Brevis commentarius de Islandia was reprinted in 1598 in Richard Hakluyt's Principal Navigations of the English Nation. This defense of Iceland and subsequent works were important for introducing European scholars to the ancient literature of Iceland and the richness of the manuscripts present there. In the context of the mounting conflicts between Denmark and Sweden, which saw both countries trying to establish historical precedents for their empire-building, it also played a formative role in the development of European nationalism, participating in the ethnographic insult and counterinsult by which European countries came to distinguish themselves in print. Through this and other writings–particularly his most important work, the Crymogæa of 1609–Arngrímur became an influential figure, inspiring leading Danish and Icelandic historians of subsequent generations, most prominently Ole Worm.

In his historical writings Arngrímur had access to texts no longer extant, most importantly a large fragment of Skjöldunga saga which was later lost completely. His works on legendary Danish and Swedish kings are the most important evidence for the contents of the lost saga. He also had in his possession for 40 or so years the Hauksbók manuscript, within which the only complete extant version of the Völuspa and the Hervararsaga ok Heidreks is featured, among a number of others.

He was parish rector at Melstaður. He lived there from 1598 to 1648. In 1597, he had been appointed dean of Húnavatnsþing, the deanery to which Melstaður belonged at the time.

He is pictured on the now obsolete Icelandic 10 krónur banknote. See Icelandic króna.

== Works ==
- Brevis commentarius de Islandia
- Crymogæa, a history of Iceland in three volumes
- Supplementum Historiæ Norvegicæ
- Rerum Danicarum fragmenta
- Ad Catalogum Regum Sveciæ, a quo danic: historiæ Norvegiæ, compendium incipit, annotanda
- Anatome Blefkeniana
- Eintal sálarinnar við sjálfa sig
- Epistola pro patria defensoria
- Apotribe virulentæ et atrocis calumniæ
- Athanasia (in memory of Guðbrandur Þorláksson)
- Specimen Islandiæ historicum
- Gronlandia
- Arngrimi Jonae opera latine conscripta, ed. by Jakob Benediktsson, Bibliotheca Arnamagnaeana, 9-12, 4 vols. (Copenhagen 1950-57)

== See also ==
- List of Icelandic writers
- Icelandic literature
