= List of bishops of Hólar =

Diocese of Hólar Hólabiskupa
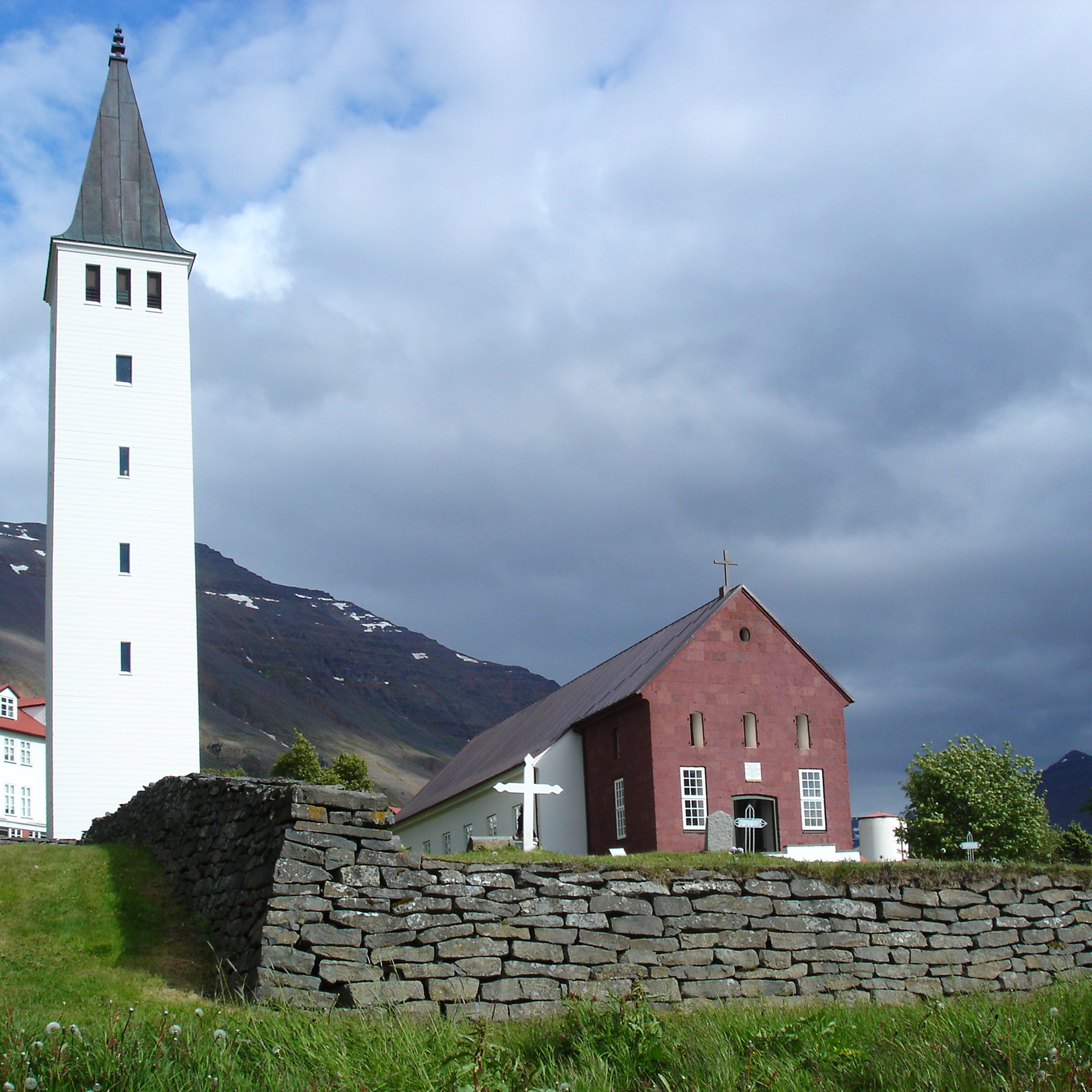
- Hólar Cathedral

Location
- Country: Iceland

Information
- Denomination: Church of Iceland
- Established: 1106 (As Diocese of Hólar); 1909 (As Suffragan Diocese of Hólar)
- Dissolved: 1801 (As Diocese of Hólar)
- Cathedral: Hólar Cathedral
- Suffragan: Solveig Lára Guðmundsdóttir

The Diocese of Hólar is a suffragan diocese of the Church of Iceland. The Bishop of Hólar is one of two suffragan bishops to the Bishop of Iceland. The Diocese of Hólar existed between 1106 and 1801 when it was amalgamated into the Diocese of Iceland under the leadership of the Bishop of Iceland. In 1909, the diocese was revived as a titular see of the Church of Iceland.

The following people were bishops of Hólar, Iceland:

== Roman Catholic ==
=== Former bishopric ===
- 1106–1121: St. Jón Ögmundsson
- 1122–1145: Ketill Þorsteinsson
- 1147–1162: Björn Gilsson
- 1163–1201: Brandur Sæmundsson
- 1203–1237: Guðmundur góði Arason
- 1238–1247: Bótólfur
- 1247–1260: Heinrekur Kársson
- 1263–1264: Brandur Jónsson
- 1267–1313: Jörundur Þorsteinsson
- 1313–1322: Auðunn rauði Þorbergsson
- 1324–1331: Lárentíus Kálfsson
- 1332–1341: Egill Eyjólfsson
- 1342–1356: Ormr Ásláksson
- 1358–1390: Jón skalli Eiríksson
- 1391–1411: Pétur Nikulásson
- 1411–1423: Jón Henriksson
- 1425–1435: Jón Vilhjálmsson
- 1435–1440: Jón Bloxwich
- 1441–1441: Róbert Wodbor
- 1442–1457: Gottskálk Keneksson
- 1458–1495: Ólafur Rögnvaldsson
- 1496–1520: Gottskálk grimmi Nikulásson
- 1524–1550: Jón Arason

== Lutheran ==
- 1552–1569: Ólafur Hjaltason
- 1571–1627: Guðbrandur Þorláksson
- 1628–1656: Þorlákur Skúlason
- 1657–1684: Gísli Þorláksson
- 1684–1690: Jón Vigfússon
- 1692–1696: Einar Þorsteinsson
- 1697–1710: Björn Þorleifsson
- 1711–1739: Steinn Jónsson
- 1741–1745: Ludvig Harboe
- 1746–1752: Halldór Brynjólfsson
- 1755–1779: Gísli Magnússon
- 1780–1781: Jón Teitsson
- 1784–1787: Árni Þórarinsson
- 1789–1798: Sigurður Stefánsson

The Diocese was amalgamated in 1801 and now forms part of the Diocese of Reykjavik.

=== Suffragan bishopric ===
The see was discontinued from 1801 to 1909. It was revived in 1909 as a suffragan bishopric to the Bishop of Iceland, with the bishop's cathedra in the traditional Hólar cathedral church. In 1990, fresh legislation increased the authority and responsibilities of the Bishop of Hólar as an assistant bishop in the Reykjavik diocese.

- 1909–1927: Geir Sæmundsson
- 1928–1937: Hálfdán Guðjónsson
- 1937–1959: Friðrik J. Rafnar
- 1959–1969: Sigurður Stefánsson
- 1969–1981: Pétur Sigurgeirsson
- 1982–1991: Sigurður Guðmundsson
- 1991–2002: Bolli Gústavsson
- 2003–2012: Jón Aðalsteinn Baldvinsson
- 2012–2022: Solveig Lára Guðmundsdóttir
- 2022–present: Gísli Gunnarsson

== See also ==
- List of Skálholt bishops
- Bishop of Iceland

== Sources ==
- Sigurdson, Erika Ruth, 'The Church in Fourteenth-Century Iceland: Ecclesiastical Administration, Literacy, and the Formation of an Elite Clerical Identity' (unpublished PhD thesis, University of Leeds, 2011), p. 242, http://etheses.whiterose.ac.uk/2610/ (pre-Reformation bishops).
- Gunnar Kristjánsson et al., eds, Saga biskupsstólanna: Skálholt 950 ára 2006, Hólar 900 ára (Akureyri: Hólar, 2006), pp. 854–55.
