= Gátur Gestumblinda =

Old Icelandic verse riddles

The riddles of Hervarar saga ok Heiðreks, also known as Gátur Gestumblinda ('Gestumblindi's riddles'), Heiðreks gátur ('Heiðrekr's riddles') and Heiðreksmál ('Heiðrekr's speech'), are a group of around thirty-seven Old Icelandic verse riddles that constitute the main evidence for medieval Scandinavian riddling. They appear in Hervarar saga ok Heiðreks (itself also known as Hervarar saga and as Heiðreks saga) as part of a riddle-contest in which the god Óðinn, disguised as a man called Gestumblindi, propounds riddles to the saga's protagonist, Heiðrekr. In the estimation of Jeffrey Scott Love in 2013, they 'have received more scholarly attention than any other passage in the text'.

The riddles provide insights into Norse mythology, medieval Scandinavian social norms (including what is believed to be the only portrayal of female homosexuality in Old Norse), and rarely attested poetic forms.

== Frame-story ==
The riddles are first attested as part of Hervarar saga ok Heiðreks, though after the Middle Ages they were also transmitted separately from the saga in numerous manuscripts. By making the riddles part of a wisdom-contest involving Óðinn, the saga recalls other Old Norse mythological wisdom-contests, particularly those in the poems Vafþrúðnismál, Alvíssmál, and Grímnismál. The following summary of the frame-story is based on the R-recension of the saga, as edited by Christopher Tolkien; the other medieval redactions are substantively similar.

After a violent youth, King Heiðrekr has settled down in his kingdom of Reiðgotaland and become a wise king. He has in his hirð twelve men whom he entrusts to offer a just judgement to any of his enemies. Heiðrekr's enemies may also win their case against the king by posing riddles that Heiðrekr cannot answer.

Gestumblindi is a powerful man who has wronged the King. Heiðrekr sends a message to Gestumblindi saying that he must come to a settlement with the king or risk his life. Gestumblindi sacrifices to Óðinn, asking him for assistance. Shortly thereafter, a stranger appears at Gestumblindi's homestead. They exchange clothes and Gestumblindi goes into hiding, and everyone believes the visitor—implicitly Óðinn—to be Gestumblindi himself.

The person thought to be Gestumblindi then goes to King Heiðrekr, takes up the option to challenge Heiðrekr to solve riddles, and, depending on the manuscript, presents around thirty-seven. Heiðrekr solves them all until, finally, Óðinn/Gestumblindi asks Heiðrekr "What did Odin whisper in Baldr's ear before Baldr was cremated?"—an unsolvable riddle of the kind known as a neck-riddle. Heiðrekr, realising that his visitor is Óðinn, becomes very angry and tries to strike Odin with his sword Tyrfingr, but Óðinn turns into a hawk and flees. Óðinn curses Heiðrekr to be killed by slaves, which transpires in the following chapter. (Heiðrekr's sword cuts off a piece of the bird's tail, which the saga says is why the hawk has a short tail.)

== Manuscripts ==
The riddles survive in the three main medieval recensions of Heiðreks saga, known as R, U, and H. The H-version includes the largest number, albeit by virtue of copies of that now fragmentary manuscript made when it was in a more complete state.

== Form ==
The riddles are all in verse, each one stanza long, and well integrated in their style into the genre of Eddaic poetry. Each stanza has six to eight lines, usually in the metre ljóðaháttr, followed by a two-line conclusion in the metre fornyrðislag, 'Heiðrekr konungr | hyggðu at gátu' ('consider this riddle, King Heiðrekr') (though in the manuscripts themselves this repeated line is usually abbreviated or even omitted). The riddles are mostly 'true riddles', providing a metaphorical description of their subject. The riddles often include formulaic phrases like "hvat er þat undra, er ek úti sá | fyrir Dellings durum?" ("what wonder is that, which I saw outside, before the doors of Dellingr?").

Modern editions read Heiðrekr's answers to the riddles as prose, but nineteenth-century scholars thought they might originally have been in verse and Carl Christian Rafn recast them as verse in his 1829–30 edition.

== Content and sequencing ==
The solution to two of the riddles is a mythological being; eight describe man-made artefacts; and most of the others describe the natural world. The order and to a lesser extent the content of the riddles differs dramatically between the medieval manuscripts of the saga and scholars have concluded that there is little chance of reconstructing the order found in the saga's archetype. Jeffrey Scott Love has noted that

the first four riddles in all three recensions are practically identical and always appear in the same order. These four beginning riddles, along with the Óðinn riddle and the Baldr question which end the verse cluster, are the only stanzas whose sequence remains constant through all three saga redactions [...] the first four and final two stanzas may represent a core set of riddles which eventually grew into the collections which now appear in the Hervarar saga manuscripts.

The H redaction groups riddles by the phrasing used in their openings while others hint at thematic organisation.

The solutions are listed here from the edition of Burrows; the sign '✗' indicates a riddle in Hauksbók that has no equivalent in the other redactions.

Solution	Verse number in Burrows's edition	Verse number in Orchard's edition	Verse number in Reykjavík, Stofnun Árna Magnússonar, GKS 2845 4to (R)	Verse number in Uppsala, University Library, R 715 (U)	Verse number in Hauksbók version (H)	metre (apart from last line)
Ale	1	1	41	48	31	ljóðaháttr
Paths	2	2	42	49	32	ljóðaháttr
Dew	3	3	43	50	33	ljóðaháttr
Hammer	4	4	44	51	34	ljóðaháttr
Fog	5	5	55	64	35	ljóðaháttr
Anchor	6	6	63	66	36	ljóðaháttr
Raven, dew, fish, waterfall	7	7	✗	✗	37	lines 1–4 ljóðaháttr half-lines, otherwise normal ljóðaháttr
Leek	8	8	47	57	38	ljóðaháttr
Bellows	9	9	45	67	39	ljóðaháttr
Hail	10	10	✗	✗	40	ljóðaháttr
Dung beetle	11	11	✗	✗	41	ljóðaháttr
Pregnant sow	12	12	66	73	42	mixture of ljóðaháttr and fornyrðislag
Arrow	13	13	✗	✗	43	ljóðaháttr
Spider	14	14	46	56	44	ljóðaháttr
Sun	15	15	✗	✗	45	ljóðaháttr
Obsidian	16	16	48	62	46	mixture of ljóðaháttr and málaháttr
Swan	17	17	49	68	47	mixture of fornyrðislag and málaháttr
Angelica	18	18	50	58	48	ljóðaháttr
Hnefatafl pieces	19	19	53	60	49	ljóðaháttr
Ptarmigans	20	20	58	55	50	ljóðaháttr
Waves	21	21	59	54	51	ljóðaháttr
Waves	22	22	60	52	52	ljóðaháttr
Waves	23		61	53	✗	ljóðaháttr
Waves	24		64	65	53	ljóðaháttr
Dead snake on an ice-floe	25	24	51	69	54	ljóðaháttr
Húnn in hnefatafl	26	25	56	61	55	ljóðaháttr
Shield	27	26	57	71	56	fornyrðislag
Duck nesting in a skull	28	27	62	70	57	fornyrðislag
Cow	29	28	67	✗	58	mixture of fornyrðislag and málaháttr
Fire	30	29	54	63	59	ljóðaháttr
Horse and mare	31	30	✗	✗	60	fornyrðislag
Ítrekr and Andaðr	32	31	52	59	61	ljóðaháttr
Piglets	33	32	65	72	62	fornyrðislag
Embers	34	33	✗	✗	63	ljóðaháttr
Hawk with eider-duck in its claws	35	34	68	✗	64	fornyrðislag
Óðinn and Sleipnir	36	35	69	74	65	ljóðaháttr
Baldr riddle (unanswered)	37	GES EP	70	75	66	málaháttr

== Origins and analogues ==
Twenty-first-century research has concluded that the stylistic diversity of the riddles, the demonstrable predilection of Heiðreks saga for integrating pre-existing poems, and the existence of some other riddles elsewhere in the Old Icelandic corpus make it most likely that the saga drew on pre-existing written riddles rather than all the riddles being composed especially for the saga.

Through the twentieth century, it was accepted that the Heiðreks saga riddles had few analogues among wider international riddles. However, twenty-first century research first emphasised the degree to which the riddles of the saga are integrated into Eddaic verse conventions, and then identified more analogues for the riddles. Two seem to reflect the stock of oral folk-riddles known from more widely in Europe: riddle 29 is the earliest vernacular attestation of the famous international riddle-type Four Hang; Two Point the Way, while riddle 36, the so-called 'Óðinn riddle', is a variant of the international Rider-and-horse riddle:

Hverir eru þeir tveir
er tíu hafa fœtr,
augu þrjú,
ok einn hala?
Heiðrekr konungr,
hyggðu at gátu!

Translation:

Who are those twain
that on ten feet run,
three their eyes are
but only one tail?
This riddle ponder
O prince Heidrek!

Medieval analogues have been identified for three others: the riddle of the sow with an unborn litter (number 12 above) has a precursor in the Anglo-Saxon poet Aldhelm's enigma 84, 'De scrofa pregnante'; the leek riddle (number 8 above) has a close analogue in the Bern Riddles and a more distant one in the riddles of Dunash ben Labraṭ; and the core conceit of the angelica riddle (number 18 above), that the plant is a virgin yet a mother, is shared with ancient and medieval riddles in Latin, Greek, Hebrew, and Arabic.

== Literary criticism ==
Hannah Burrows has explored the series of 'wave-riddles', in which the waves of the sea are personified as powerful and dangerous women, and has shown the subtle interplay of this series with non-Christian mythology, which reveals how the waves are, 'like Ægir's daughters, both seductive—a source of food and of adventure—and dangerous and unpredictable, taking lives at will'.

== Influence ==
In post-medieval manuscripts the riddles were often transmitted separately from the rest of the saga, emphasising their independent literary interest, and were the subject of a seventeenth-century commentary by Björn Jónsson á Skarðsá. This literary circulation also led to the riddles circulating in Icelandic oral tradition into the nineteenth century.They went on to influence oral riddling in Iceland.

The riddle-contest in Heiðreks saga seems to have become the basis for a Faroese ballad, Gátu ríma ('riddle ballad'), first attested from nineteenth-century oral tradition.

Becoming more widely known in the early modern period through printed editions of Heiðreks saga, the 'Óðinn riddle' entered oral tradition. A modern Swedish children's variant of it runs "vad har tre ögon, tio ben och en svans?" ("what has three eyes, ten legs and a tail?").

== Editions and translations ==
The riddles have been edited and translated many times as part of Hervarar saga ok Heiðreks. Twenty-first-century editions and translations focusing solely on the riddles include those by Burrows and Orchard.
