= Scandinavian riddles =

Traditional form of word-play in Scandinavia

Riddles (Old Norse, Icelandic and Faroese gáta, pl. gátur; Bokmål and Nynorsk gåte, pl. gåter; Danish gåde, pl. gåder; Swedish gåta, pl. gåtor) are widely attested in post-medieval Scandinavian languages.

== Medieval period ==
Few riddles are attested from medieval Scandinavia (by contrast with the numerous Anglo-Saxon riddles in the quite closely connected literature of medieval England), although Norse mythology does attest to a number of other wisdom-contests, usually involving the god Óðinn, and the complex metaphors of the extensive corpus of skaldic verse present an enigmatic aesthetic similar to riddles. A number of riddles from medieval Scandinavia are also attested in Latin.

The majority of the surviving Old Norse riddles occur in one section of the Icelandic Hervarar saga ok Heiðreks, in which the god Óðinn propounds around 37 verse riddles (depending on the manuscript), mostly in the ljóðaháttur metre; these are known as the Gátur Gestumblinda. The saga is thought to have been composed in the thirteenth century, but the riddles themselves may not be of uniform date and some could be older or younger. They went on to influence oral riddling in Iceland.

Eight verse riddles, all in ljóðaháttur, are also attested in the Icelandic manuscript fragment Reykjavík, Stofnun Árna Magnússonar, AM 687 b 4to, thought to date from between 1490 and 1510. They seem to come from a collection of at least nineteen riddles and to have originated in Continental Scandinavia around the twelfth or thirteenth century. Their solutions are thought to be steelyard, nail-header, wool-combs, footstool, pot-hook, bell-clapper, fish-hook, and an angelica stalk; one is also attested from oral tradition in Norway and at least three circulated in oral as well as written tradition in Iceland.

Scattered riddles are found elsewhere in medieval Scandinavian sources. Three medieval riddles in verse about birds are known, first attested in a part of the manuscript Reykjavík, Stofnun Árna Magnússonar AM 625 4to from around 1500. A riddle also appears in the perhaps fourteenth-century Þjalar-Jóns saga, A runic graffito carved in Hopperstad stave-church that can be read as 'Lokarr fal lokar sinn í lokarspónum' and translated as 'Lokarr ("plane") concealed his plane in the plane-shavings' has also been seen as riddlic in sentiment.

Brynjulf Alver also identified two Scandinavian ballads attested after the Middle Ages and featuring riddle-contests as medieval in origin: På Grønalihei (attested from Norway) and Svend Vonved (attested from Norway, Denmark, and, as Sven Svanevit, Sweden). På Grønalihei opens with three stanzas about two brothers debating how to share their inheritance; they decide to settle the question through a riddle-contest. Eighteen riddles follow, some of them true riddles and some wisdom-questions, including one biblical riddle. In Svend Vonved, the riddle-contest is one episode in a longer story of the hero's quest for vengeance.

Early modern scholars sometimes also thought of Icelandic þulur as riddles, but, while often confusing or enigmatic, þulur do not require solutions as riddles do.

== Modern period ==
With the advent of print in the West, collections of riddles and similar kinds of questions began to be published. A large number of riddle collections were printed in the German-speaking world and, partly under German influence, in Scandinavia. Scandinavian riddles have also been extensively collected from oral tradition. Key collections and studies include:

- Bødker, Laurits 1964 in co-operation with Brynjulf Alver, Bengt Holbek and Leea Virtanen. The Nordic Riddle. Terminology and Bibliography. Copenhagen.
- Jón Árnason, Íslenzkar gátur, skemtanir, vikivakar og Þulur, I (Kaupmannahöfn: Hið Íslenzka bókmenntafélag, 1887).
- Olsson, Helmer 1944. Svenska gåtor 1. Folkgåtor från Bohuslän. Uppsala.
- Palmenfelt, Ulf 1987. Vad är det som går och går...? Svenska gåtor från alla tider i urval av Ulf Palmenfelt. Stockholm.
- Peterson, Per 1985. Gåtor och skämt. En undersökning om vardagligt berättande bland skolbarn. Etnolore 4. Skrifter från Etnologiska institutionen vid Uppsala universitet. Uppsala: Uppsala universitet.
- Ström, Fredrik 1937. Svenska Folkgåtor. Stockholm.
- Wessman, V.E.V. (red.) 1949. Finlands svenska folktidning IV. Gåtor. Skrifter utg. av Svenska Litteratursällskapet i Finland 327. Helsingfors.

The composition of verse riddles continued into the early modern period in Iceland: Stefán Ólafsson of Vallanes (c. 1618–1688), for example, composed three.

== Demise of tradition ==
The traditional, oral riddle fell out of widespread use during the later twentieth century, being replaced by other oral-literary forms, and by other tests of wit such as quizzes.
