= Crymogæa =

1609 book by Arngrímur Jónsson

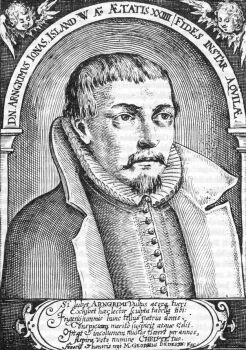
Arngrímur Jónsson

Crymogæa (from Greek Κρυογαια, "ice-land") is a book in Latin written by the Icelandic scholar Arngrímur Jónsson and published in Hamburg in 1609 and again in 1610. It was the first historical description of Iceland since Íslendingabók and the first comprehensive book about the history of Iceland.

== Contents ==
The book was aimed at foreign readers. The first part narrates the history of Iceland until the end of the Icelandic Commonwealth. The second part contains stories about the medieval Icelandic heroes. The third part continues the history of Iceland until Arngrímur's time. Aside from the political and cultural history of Iceland, the book offers descriptions of the religion and language of the Icelanders.

== Legacy ==
Presenting the medieval period as a heroic golden age, followed by a decline into corruption under foreign rule, Arngrímur created an influential narrative of Icelandic history which caused a revival of Icelandic scholars' interest in their past in the 17th century, and even influenced the Icelandic independence movement in the 19th century. It has been called "the manifesto of Icelandic patriotism."

Crymogæa's influence stretched much farther than Iceland. Because of it, Arngrímur became the best-known Icelander among the learned Europeans in the 17th century. His humanistic work made them aware of the Icelandic sagas and kindled a general interest in medieval Icelandic literature. Crymogæa also introduced Norse mythology to the rest of Europe.
