= Vigur =

Small island in the Westfjords region of Iceland

- Location within Iceland

Geography
- Location: Ísafjarðardjúp
- Coordinates: 66.055°N 22.828°W
- Area: 0.6 km^{2} (0.23 sq mi)

Administration
- Iceland
- Constituency: Northwest
- Region: Vestfirðir

Demographics
- Languages: Icelandic
- Ethnic groups: Icelanders

Additional information
- Time zone: WET (UTC+0)

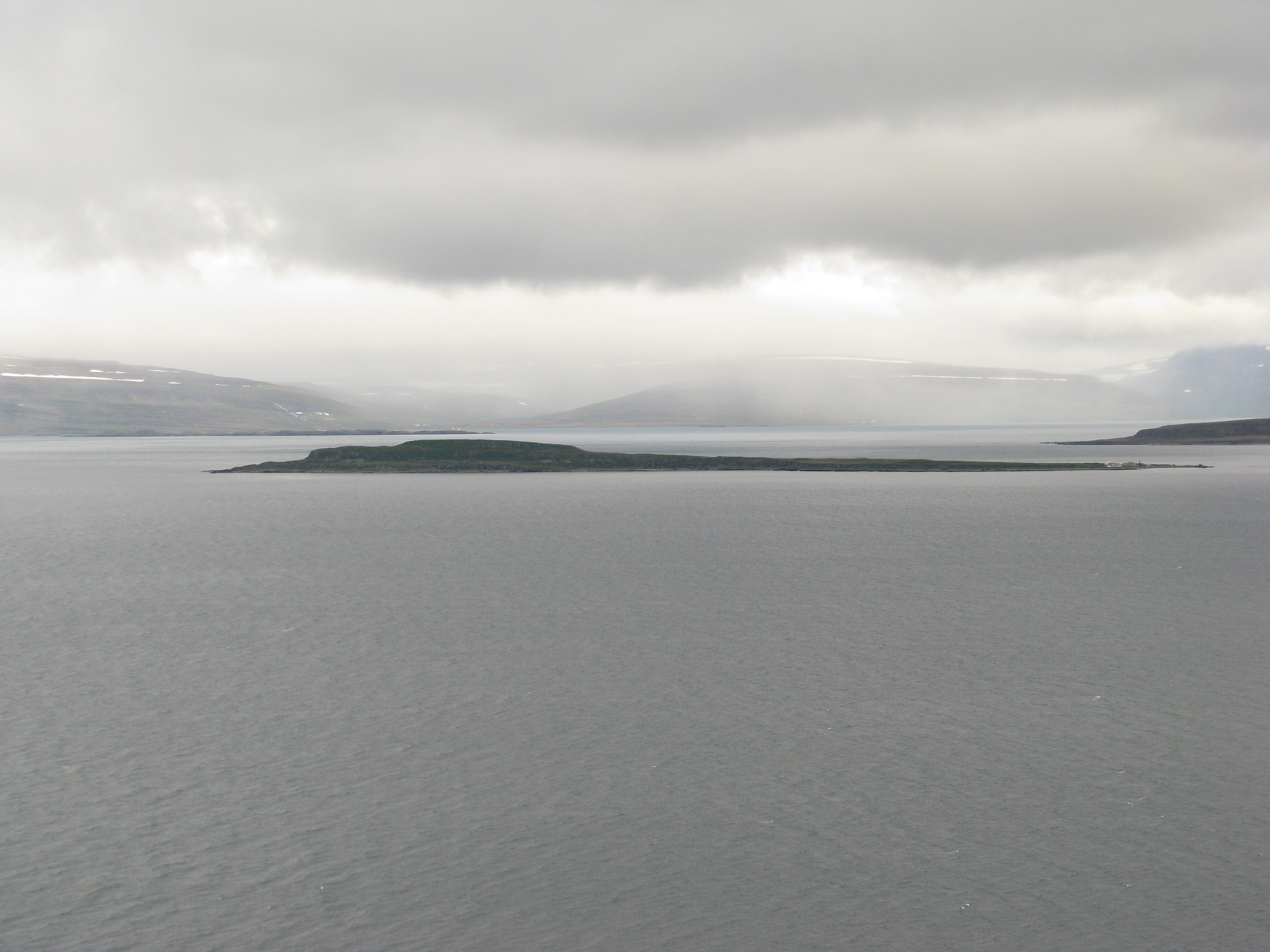
Vigur, pictured in September 2009

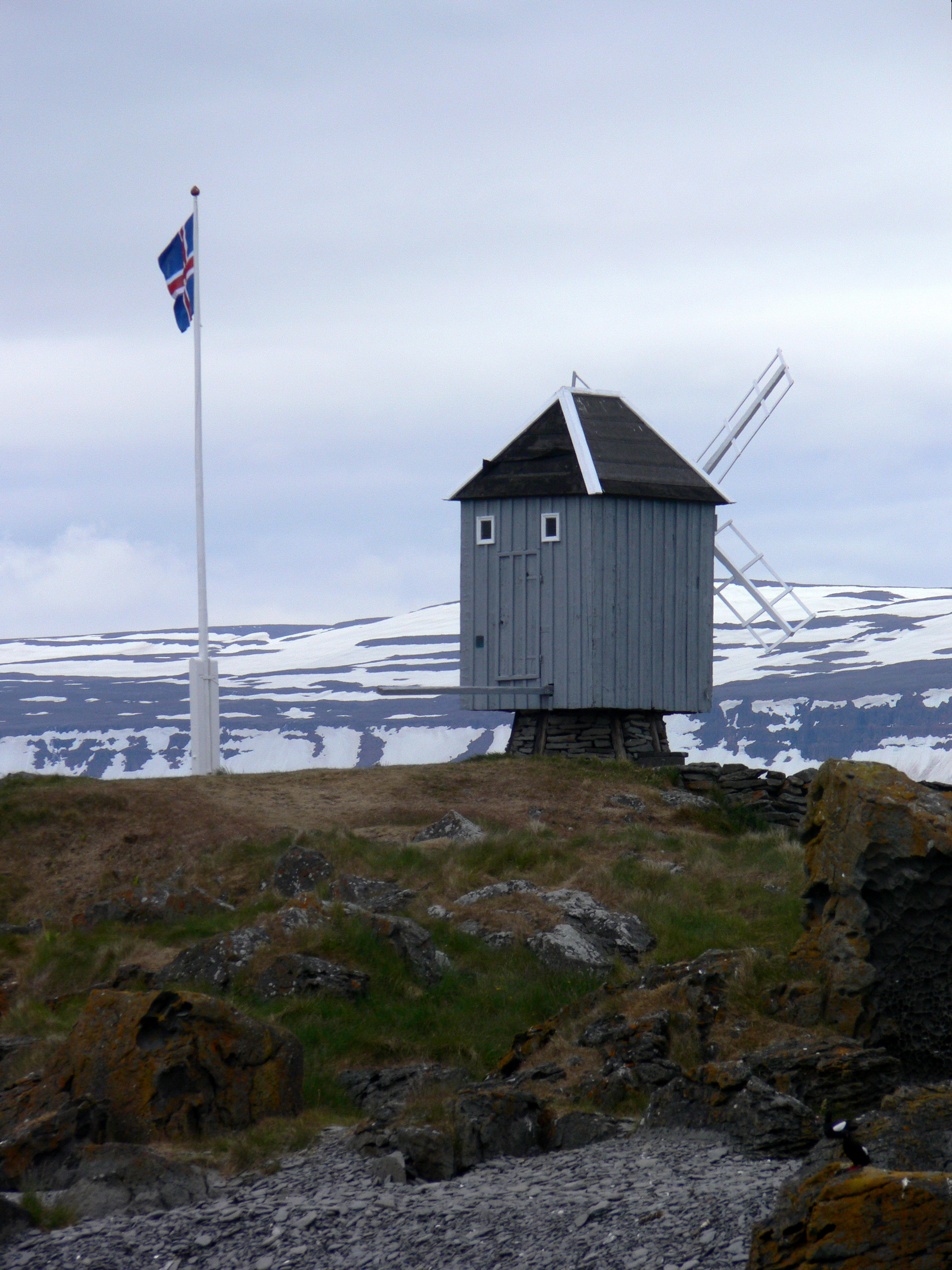
Vigur windmill, pictured in July 2011

Vigur (Icelandic pronunciation: [ˈvɪːɣʏr̥]) is the second largest island of the Ísafjarðardjúp fjord in Westfjords, Iceland. Located just south of the Arctic Circle, the island is around 2 kilometres (6,600 ft) in length and 400 metres (1,300 ft) in width. The island is most noted for its thriving seabird colonies (particularly Atlantic puffins), traditional eiderdown production, and historical buildings.

The two-story Viktoriuhús, built in 1860, is one of the oldest timber buildings in Iceland and is part of the Historical Buildings Collection of the Þjóðminjasafn Íslands. Iceland's oldest seaworthy boat, Vigurbreiður, is also on Vigur.

Today, only a single farm remains on Vigur. In the seventeenth century, this farm was the home of Magnús Jónsson, a wealthy man who collected and commissioned manuscripts. The first reference to Vigur in the written record is from 1194, but it may well have been mentioned earlier under a different name.

A windmill, built around 1840, is also located on the island. It is the only extant historic windmill in the country and may be the northernmost windmill in the world.

Each year, around 3,500 pairs of the common eider nest on Vigur. Their nests are lined with eider down, which is collected by the farmer once eggs have hatched and chicks have left. The down is dried, sorted, and cleaned by hand, using centuries-old methods.

Vigur is home to one of the largest puffin colonies in Iceland as well as to a rare colony of about a thousand black guillemots. It also hosts vast numbers of Arctic terns (880 breeding pairs) and other Arctic seabirds.
