= Melstaður =

Parish church in Iceland

Coordinates: 65.31156°N 20.90598°W

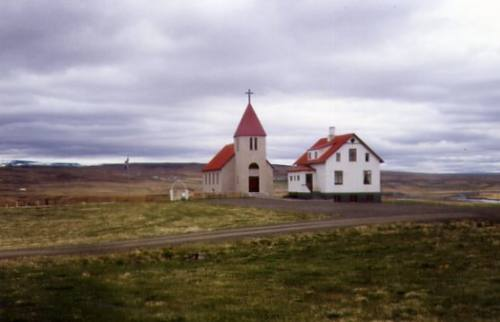
Melstaður

Melstaður is a church and vicarage of the Church of Iceland within the Húnavatns parish (Húnavatnsprestakall) in Miðfjörður, Iceland.

The church belongs to the Húnavatn and Skagafjörður diocese. Melstaður was formerly, as of 2018, itself a parish. In 2019, the merger of Melstaðarprestakall and other parishes into Húnavatnsprestakall was proposed. At some later date the merger was completed.

Arngrímur Jónsson was rector there in the late 16th and early 17th century.

Ólaf Pálsson left a cathedral benefice in Reykjavík in 1871 to take up the position as priest at Melstaður. He died in Melstaður in 1876.

When the church installed a harmonium in 1872 during the rectorate of Ólaf Pálsson, it was the first such instrument in a rural church in Húnavatnssýsla. His son Theódór was the first organist.
