= Þórður Þorláksson =

Icelandic bishop (1637–1697)

- Bishop of Skálholt
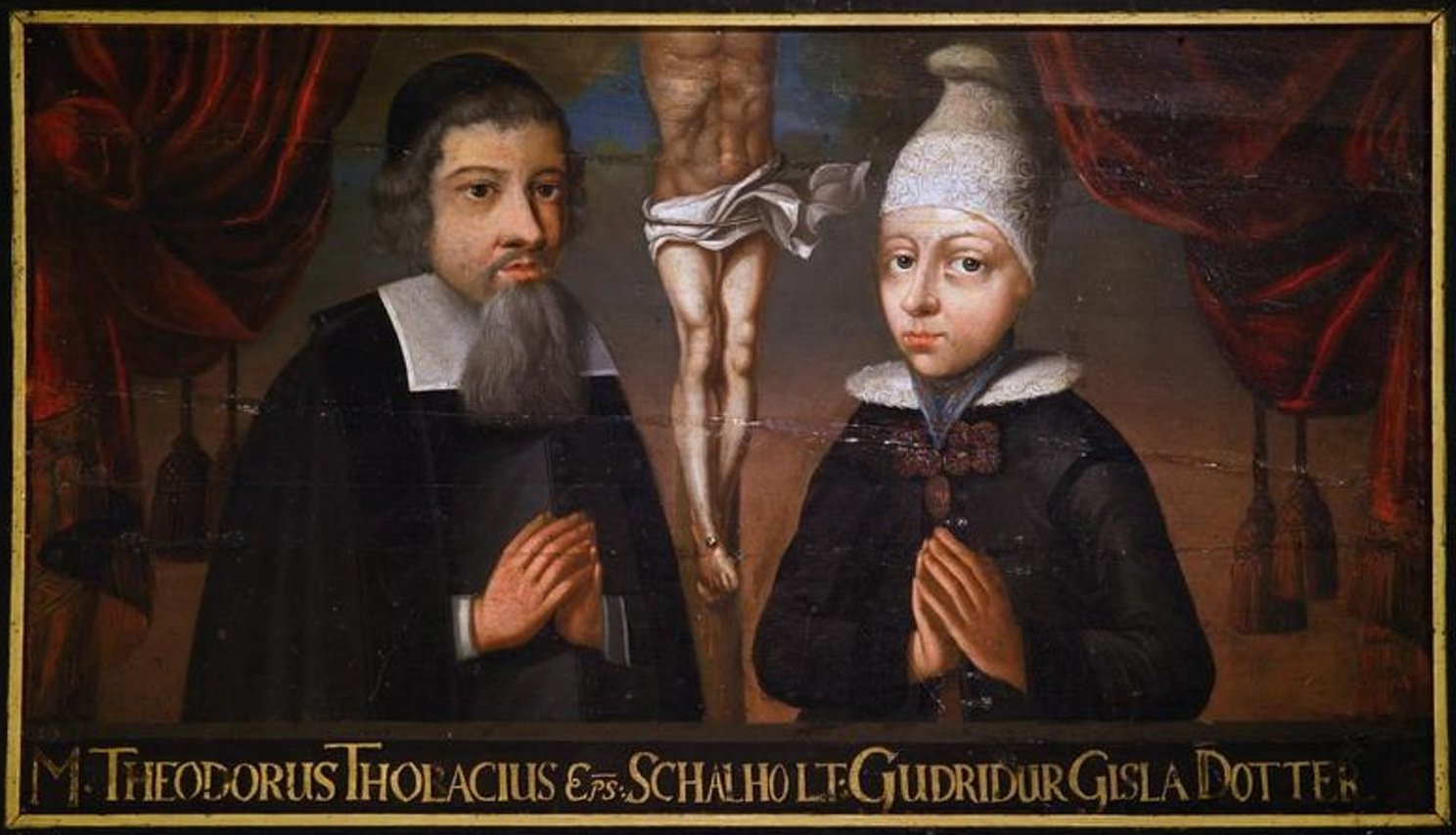
- Bishop Þórður Þorláksson and Guðríður Gísladóttir by an unknown artist circa 1697
- Church: Church of Iceland
- Diocese: Skálholt
- Appointed: 1674
- In office: 1674–1697
- Predecessor: Brynjólfur Sveinsson
- Successor: Jón Vídalín

Personal details
- Born: 14 August 1637 Hólar, Iceland
- Died: 17 March 1697 (aged 59) Skálholt, Iceland
- Spouse: Guðríður Gísladóttir (m. 1674)

Þórður Þorláksson (14 August 1637 – 17 March 1697), also known by the Latinized name Theodorus Thorlacius, was the Lutheran bishop of Skálholt from 1674 until his death. Under Þórður's direction, the Church of Iceland's printing press was moved from Hólar í Hjaltadal to Skálholt where he established the first print archive in the country.

== Family and early life ==
Þórður was the son of Þorlákur Skúlason, bishop of Hólar, and Kristín Gísladóttir. He studied at the Hólaskóli college before travelling to Denmark to attend the University of Copenhagen. Þórður returned to Iceland in 1660 to serve as headmaster of Hólaskóli but went abroad again in 1663 to study in Rostock and the Wittenberg. He also travelled to Paris, Belgium, and the Netherlands, as well as visiting Stangaland, Norway, where he worked with the historian Þormóður Torfason. During this time, Þórður wrote a history of Iceland, Dissertatio Chorographico-Historica de Islandia, which was published in 1666.

== Bishop ==
Þórður was ordained as a Lutheran minister in Copenhagen on 25 February 1672. The following year, he returned to Hólar and took office as Bishop of Skálholt upon the resignation of Brynjólfur Sveinsson in 1674. In 1685, Þórður received approval from King Christian V to move the church's printing press from Hólar to Skálholt, where a lively printing business for both ecclesiastical and secular works began, including the first printed edition of the medieval Landnámabók in 1688. Other works published under Þórður's direction include Ari Þorgilsson's Íslendingabók, the Kristni saga, and a two-volume edition of The Greatest Saga of Óláfr Tryggvason. This last work included a number of the Icelandic sagas as part of the second volume. In all, more than 60 books were printed at Skálholt during Þórður's lifetime.

Þórður also produced maps of Iceland and Greenland, as well as a copy of Sigurður Stefánsson's map of ancient Norse sites in the western Atlantic. In addition to geography, Þórður was interested in agriculture and he oversaw experiments with different varieties of wheat in Skálholt.

Þórður was also a musician. He is said to have owned three instruments, which he brought back with him to Iceland from the continent: a chamber organ, a clavichord, and a symphonia (symfón) or hurdy-gurdy. He published two volumes of hymns (with notation) by the Danish bishop Thomas Kingo, and the 1691 edition of the Graduale (the Icelandic missal/hymnal) included, for the first time, an introduction to music theory as an appendix.

== Personal life ==
In 1674, Þórður married Guðríður Gísladóttir (1651–1707), daughter of Gísli Magnússon (also known as Vísi-Gísli or Gísli the Wise), governor of Hlíðarendi. Their sons were Þorlákur, a school headmaster in Skálholt, and Brynjólfur, a farmer and district magistrate in Rangárvallasýsla.

Preceded by Brynjólfur Sveinsson	Bishop of Skálholt; 1674–1697	Succeeded by Jón Vídalín
