= Brynjólfur Sveinsson =

Icelandic bishop and scholar (1605–1675)

- Bishop of Skálholt
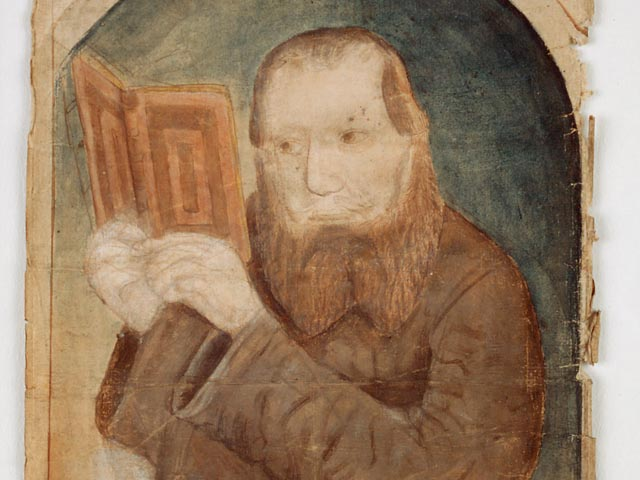
- Bishop Brynjólfur
- Church: Church of Iceland
- Diocese: Skálholt
- Appointed: 1639
- In office: 1639–1674
- Predecessor: Gísli Oddsson
- Successor: Þórður Þorláksson

Personal details
- Born: September 14, 1605 Önundarfjörður, Iceland
- Died: August 5, 1675 (aged 69) Skálholt, Iceland

Brynjólfur Sveinsson (14 September 1605 – 5 August 1675) served as the Lutheran Bishop of the see of Skálholt in Iceland. His main influence has been on modern knowledge of Old Norse literature. Brynjólfur is also known for his support of the career of the Icelandic poet and hymn writer Hallgrímur Pétursson. Brynjólfur Sveinsson is currently pictured on the 1,000 Icelandic króna banknote.

Brynjólfur was born in Önundarfjörður in the Westfjords of northwestern Iceland to the priest Sveinn Símonarson and Ragnheiður Pálsdóttir (daughter of Staðarhóls-Páll and Helga Aradóttir). He studied at the University of Copenhagen from 1624 to 1629 and was Provost of Roskilde University from 1632 to 1638.

In 1643, he named the collection of Old Norse mythological and heroic poems Edda. Brynjólfur attributed the manuscript to Sæmundr fróði, but the scholarly consensus is that whoever wrote the Eddic poems, whether in the sense of being the compiler or the poet, it could not have been Sæmundr. It is believed that the manuscript has multiple authorship from over a long span of time.

In 1650 King Frederick III appointed Brynjólfur to succeed the late Stephanius as Royal Danish Historian. He declined the post but promised the king to do what he could to collect manuscripts in Iceland. One of his first acts was to request all people residing in his diocese to turn over to the King any old manuscripts, either an original or a copy, as a gift or for a price.

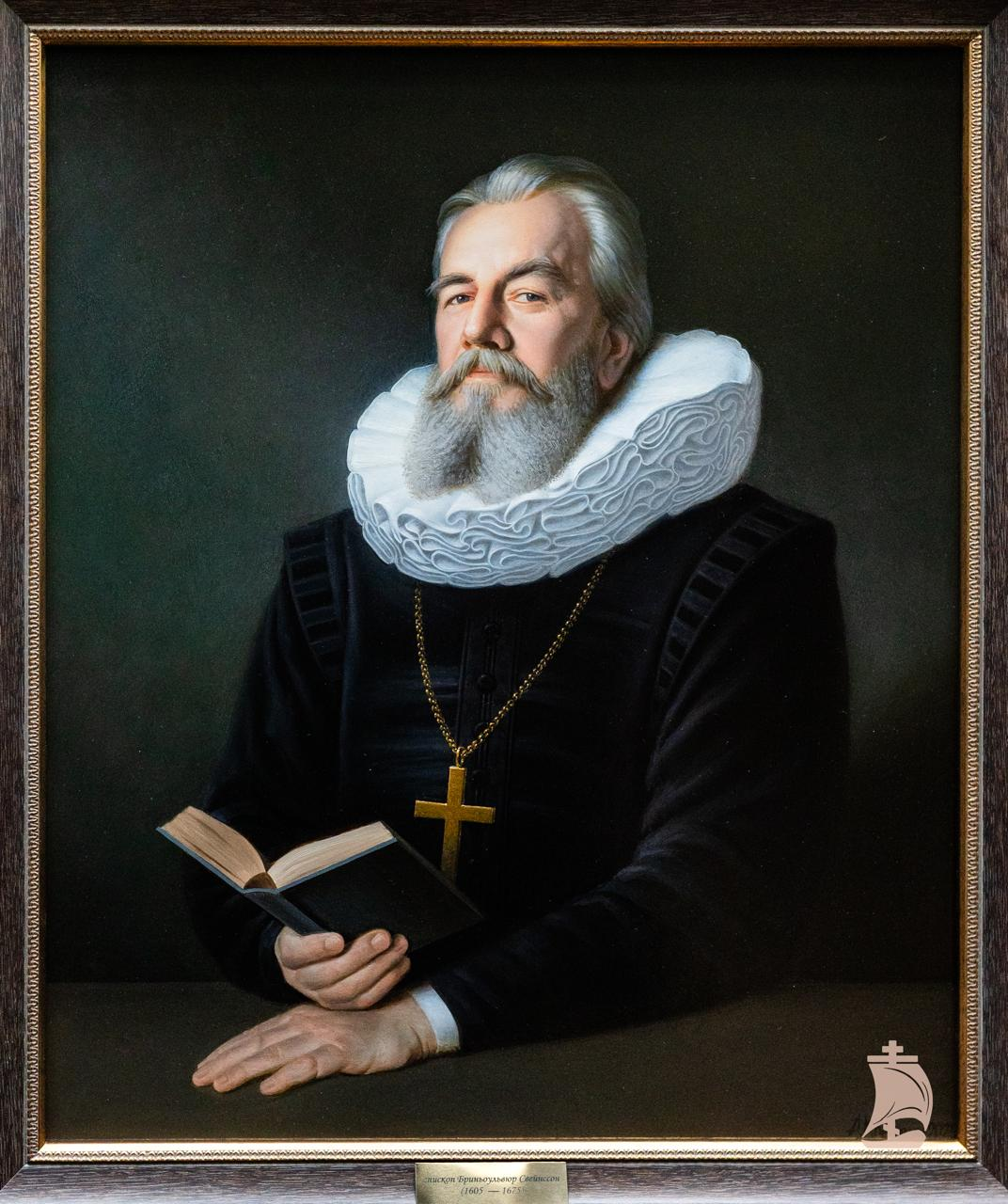
A portrait of Brynjólfur Sveinsson at the Saint Petersburg Theological Academy

Among the most monumental of the Icelandic manuscripts thus collected is the Flateyjarbók, which was secured only after a personal visit to the owner from Brynjólfur. Jón Finnsson of Flatey, Breiðafjörður, who owned the manuscript, was initially unwilling to give up his precious heirloom. After a personal visit and persuasion from Brynjólfur, Finnsson gave up the valuable manuscript. The manuscript was given to King Frederick III in 1656, and placed in the Royal Library of Copenhagen.

== Brynjólfur Sveinsson in fiction ==
The novel Brynjólfur Sveinsson biskup by Torfhildur Þorsteinsdóttir Hólm, first published in 1882, is based on the life of the historical Brynjólfur Sveinsson.

Preceded by Gísli Oddsson	Bishop of Skálholt; 1639–1674	Succeeded by Þórður Þorláksson
