= Riddle-tale =

Traditional stories featuring riddle-contests

Riddle-tales are traditional stories featuring riddle-contests. They frequently provide the context for the preservation of ancient riddles for posterity, and as such have both been studied as a narrative form in their own right, and for the riddles they contain. Such contests are a subset of wisdom contests more generally. The two major groups of these stories are: testing the wisdom of a king or other aristocrat; and testing the suitability of a suitor. Correspondingly, the Aarne–Thompson classification systems catalogue two main folktale-types including riddle-contests: AT 927, Outriddling the Judge, and AT 851, The Princess Who Can Not Solve the Riddle. Such stories invariably include answers to the riddles posed: 'the audience cannot be left dangling'.

== Background ==
The earliest example of a wisdom contest between kings is the Sumerian epic Enmerkar and the Lord of Aratta, from the first half of the second millennium BC, closely followed by the Egyptian The Quarrel of Apophis and Seqenenre, fragmentarily attested in a 13th-century BC papyrus about the Pharaoh Apophis and Seqenenre Tao. The Quarrel of Apophis and Segenenre is echoed in the later Tale of Setne Khamwas and Si-Osire, attested on papyrus in the Roman period, showing that this type of story continued to circulate in Egypt. These tales do not involve riddles as such.

These Egyptian stories, probably via lost Greek material, seem to have been an inspiration for the account of a wisdom-contest between Pharaoh Amasis II and the king of Ethiopia, in which the sage Bias of Priene helps the Pharaoh by solving the riddles, in Plutarch's 1st or 2nd-century AD Convivium Septem Sapientium. At least one of Plutarch's sources was probably shared by the Aesop Romance, which originated around the 4th century BC (chs 102–8, 111–23). The Aesop Romance also drew on similar stories of wisdom contests in various versions of the Story of Ahikar.

== List ==
The following list is based on the survey by Christine Goldberg. A fuller collection is offered by Marjorie Dundas.

Main or original language	Earliest known date	Text title and summary	AT number	References
Hebrew	8th to 6th century BCE	Samson's riddle. In the Book of Judges, Samson poses a riddle to the Philistines at his wedding feast.		Goldberg 1993, 17–18.
Hebrew	7th to 6th century BCE	Solomon and the Queen of Sheba. The queen tests Solomon with riddles (including I Kings 10.1–13 and II Chronicles 9.1–12). This inspired various later works: four riddles are ascribed to her in the 10th or 11th-century Midrash Proverbs. These plus another fourteen or fifteen tests of wisdom, some of which are riddles, appear in the Midrash ha-Ḥefez (1430 CE). The early medieval Aramic Targum Sheni also contains three riddles posed by the Queen to Solomon.		Goldberg 1993, 22–24.
Ancient Greek	6th or 5th century BCE	Homer's death. Heraclitus describes Homer being prophesied to die upon failing to solve some children's riddle. The story is also told by Hesiod.		Goldberg 1993, 15–16.
Ancient Greek	5th century BCE	Oedipus and the Sphinx. The riddle-contest is first alluded to in a play by Epicharmus of Kos.		Goldberg 1993, 13–15.
Aramaic	first century BCE or CE	Kahramâneh and the Young Prince. A young prince wins a bride through a riddle-contest. The related story of Turandot in One Thousand and One Nights, which was the inspiration for several modern plays, involves a riddle-contest: the suitors need to answer all three questions to gain the Princess's hand, or else they are beheaded; In Puccini's opera, Turandot grimly warns Calaf "the riddles are three, but Death is one".	851	Goldberg 1993, 25–26; 29–31.
Aramaic	5th century BCE	The Tale of Ahikar. Ahikar helps his king by solving riddles posed by a rival.		Goldberg 1993, 17.
Ancient Greek	1st or 2nd century CE	Septum sapientium convivium (The Dinner of the Seven Wise Men) in Plutarch's Moralia (2: 345–449). A woman poses riddles at a party.		Goldberg 1993, 16–17.
Ancient Greek	3rd century CE	Apollonius of Tyre. Antiochus tests Apollonius's suitability to marry his daughter.		Taylor 1948, 41; Goldberg 1993, 18–20.
Sanskrit	4th or 5th century CE	The Mahabharata. III.311-12 contains Yaksha Prashna, a series of riddles posed by a nature-spirit (yaksha) to Yudhishthira. III.134 contains the story of Ashtavakra, who answers the riddles posed King Janaka and then defeats one Bandin in a further wisdom-contest.		Goldberg 1993, 20–22.
Arabic	10th century CE	The marriage of Imrou-l-Qais. Imrou-l-Qais will only marry the woman who can solve his riddle.		Goldberg 1993, 24-25
Persian	10th or 11th century CE	Shahnameh. A riddle-contest between Zal and Manuchehr, the emperor of Iran. Manuchehr fears and wishes to dispose of Zal, but is advised that Zal will become an unrivalled hero of Iran, so Manuchehr tests him with riddles, mostly cosmological. Winning the riddle-contest is one of a number of steps for Zal to win the hand of Rudabeh. Also, Buzurjmihr faces a wisdom-contest.		Goldberg 1993, 26–27.
Sanskrit	11th century CE	Baital Pachisi. A vetala tells twenty-four tales, each culminating in a riddle. Unusually, the challenge here is for the hero to not solve a riddle.		Goldberg 1993, 25.
Persian?	uncertain	Gul and Sanaubar. Suitors to a princess must answer a riddle.		Goldberg 1993, 27–28.
Old Norse	13th century CE	Hervarar saga ok Heiðreks. The god Óðinn challenges King Heiðrekr to answer his riddles, known as the Gátur Gestumblinda.	cf. 927	Goldberg 1993, 31–34.
Irish	13th century CE	Imthecht na Tromdaime. The text contains at least one riddle, examples of which are very rare in medieval Irish literature. When the hero returns to the hall to punish the excessive demands of its poets, his wisdom is tested through a number of questions, including the following riddle: 'What good thing did man find on earth that God did not find?—A worthy master.'		Goldberg 1993, 37.
German	uncertain CE	In the Grimm tale "The Peasant's Wise Daughter", a peasant-girl wins the king in marriage by solving a riddle he poses.	875	
Persian	ca. 12th century 1762; 1926	The tale of Princess Turandot, a beautiful yet cold princess who proposes deadly riddles for her suitors. The tale was originally present in compilation Haft Peykar, and inspired Carlo Gozzi's commedia dell'arte Turandot and the more famous opera by Italian composer Giacomo Puccini.	851A	

Christian Schneller, in the 19th century, collected a tale from Wälschtirol (Trentino) that is quite similar to the Turandot stories: a king invades the neighbouring country and imprisons the royal couple, but their son escapes and is raised by a poor man. Years later, the boy travels to the enemy kingdom and learns that his parents are alive and the princess is testing potential suitors with deadly riddles.

In a Sri Lanka tale, The Riddle Princess: Terávili Kumari Kava, a princess loves solving riddles. A Rajah's son falls in love with her portrait and disguises himself as a penniless pilgrim in order to get to know the princess, as part of his plan.

== See also ==
- The Riddle (fairy tale)
- The Ridere of Riddles
- A Riddling Tale
- Riddle joke

== Sources ==
- Archer Taylor, The Literary Riddle before 1600 (Berkeley, CA: University of California Press, 1948).
- Christine Goldberg, Turandot's Sisters: A Study of the Folktale AT 851, Garland Folklore Library, 7 (New York: Garland, 1993).
