= Þorlákur Skúlason =

17th Century Icelandic bishop

- Bishop of Holar
- Church: Church of Iceland
- Diocese: Hólar
- Appointed: 1628
- In office: 1628–1656
- Predecessor: Guðbrandur Þorláksson
- Successor: Gísli Þorláksson

Personal details
- Born: 24 August 1597 Eiríksstaðir, Iceland
- Died: 4 January 1656 (aged 58) Hólar, Iceland

Þorlákur Skúlason (24 August 1597 – 4 January 1656) was bishop of Hólar from 1628 until his death in 1656. During his tenure, he oversaw publication of the second Icelandic translation of the full Bible.

== Early life ==
Þorlákur was born in Eiríksstaðir in Svartárdalur to the farmer Skúli Einarsson (d. 1612) and Steinunn Guðbrandsdóttir (b. 1571), the daughter of Guðbrandur Þorláksson (with Guðrún Gísladóttir), bishop of Hólar.

He grew up in Hólar with his grandfather and studied under the bishop to become a priest. In 1616, he departed Iceland for Denmark where he earned a degree at the University of Copenhagen. He returned to Hólar in 1619 to oversee the Hólar College, but in 1620 he resumed his studies in Copenhagen. After returning to Iceland in 1621, Þorlákur was installed as a priest in Hólar in 1624. One of his early tasks was to seek wood for a new cathedral.

== Bishop of Hólar ==
After the death of Bishop Guðbrandur on 20 July 1627, Þorlákur was elected as his successor. He was ordained as bishop on 16 May 1628 in Copenhagen and arrived back in Hólar on 2 August of the same year.

Páll Eggert Ólason described Þorlákur as: "A gentle man and untroubled, generally more quiet than noisy. However, the church government did well under him. He was cheerful and humorous, a gentle Latin poet with brilliant talents."

== Scholarly work ==
As bishop, Þorlákur continued the publishing of religious works as his grandfather, Guðbrandur, had done. In total about 30 books were published under his direction, most notably the second full translation of the Bible into Icelandic. Known as Þorláksbiblía, it was largely a reprinting of the earlier Guðbrandsbiblía, but with revisions made based upon the Danish-language 1607 translation by Hans Poulsen Resen. Halldór Ásmundsson, the printer at Hólar, began printing the Þorláksbiblía in 1637 and completed it on 16 June 1644. He also translated several books by the German theologian Johann Gerhard, including Meditationes Sacrae in 1630 and The Daily Exercise of Piety in 1652.

Þorlákur was also interested in archaeology and natural history, keeping up active correspondence with others in Iceland and abroad, including the Danish scientist Ole Worm. In 1647, he published in Latin a description of Iceland's natural world. Among other works, Þorlákur published was Björn Jónsson's history of the 1627 Barbary pirates' raid on Iceland.

== Personal life ==
In 1630, Þorlákur married Kristín Gísladóttir (27 February 1610 – 10 June 1694), and they had several sons and daughters, including Gísli Þorláksson, who succeeded Þorlákur as Bishop of Hólum, and Þórður Þorláksson, who became Bishop of Skálholt.

== Bibliography ==
- Páll Eggert Ólason: Íslenskar æviskrár V.
- Páll Eggert Ólason: Menn og menntir siðskiptaaldarinnar á Íslandi.

Preceded by Guðbrandur Þorláksson	Bishop of Hólar; 1628–1656	Succeeded by Gísli Þorláksson
