= Hólar Cathedral =

- Hóladómkirkja
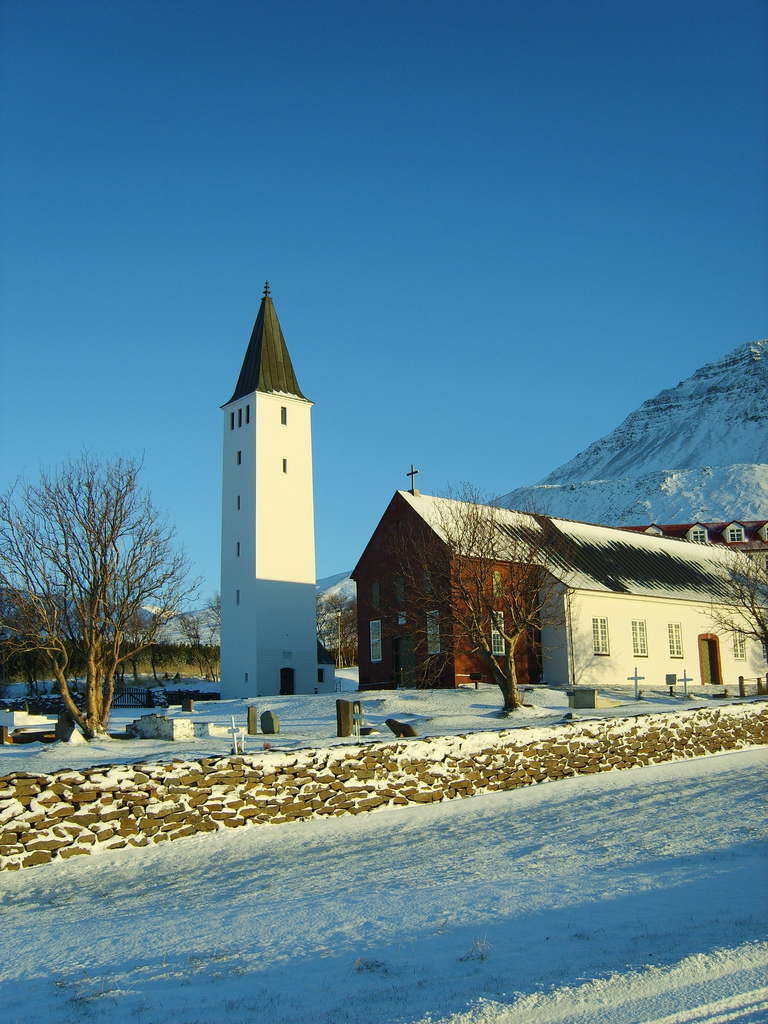
- Hólar Cathedral
- 65°44′00″N 19°06′50″W
- Location: Hólar
- Country: Iceland
- Denomination: Church of Iceland
- Previous denomination: Catholic Church
- Churchmanship: Evangelical Lutheran
- Website: Cathedral Website

History
- Status: Active
- Founded: 1050
- Founder: Oxi Hjaltason
- Consecrated: 20 November 1763

Architecture
- Functional status: Cathedral church
- Years built: 1757-1763
- Groundbreaking: 1757

Administration
- Diocese: Hólar
- Deanery: Skagafjörður
- Parish: Hólar

Clergy
- Bishop: Gísli Gunnarsson
- Priest: Halla Rut Stefánsdóttir
- Pastor: Sigríður Gunnarsdóttir

Hólar Cathedral (Icelandic: Hóladómkirkja) is a Church of Iceland cathedral church located in Hólar, Iceland. It is the official church of the Bishop of Hólar, currently Gísli Gunnarsson.

== History ==
The Cathedral lost its cathedral status in 1801 when the Diocese of Hólar was dissolved and amalgamated in the united Diocese of Iceland. It became a cathedral once more in 1909 when the diocese was re-established, this time as a suffragan see, with the bishop of Hólar being the suffragan bishop to the Bishop of Iceland.

The present church stands in the place of six other previous churches, the first one built in 1050 by Oxi Hjaltason. The second was built between 1050 and 1106, and the third after 1106 by Bishop Jón Ögmundsson. The fourth was built around 1300 by Bishop Jörundur Þorsteinsson while the fifth one was built around 1394 by Bishop Pétur Nikulásson. The sixth was constructed by Halldóra Guðbrandsdóttir around 1627, being the first church built in Iceland after the country became Lutheran in the reformation. The final and present church was built between 1757 and 1763 through the initiatives of Bishop Gísli Magnússon and was designed by architect Laurids de Thurah. The cathedral was consecrated on November 20, 1763.

== Tower ==
The church building never had a steeple. However, a tower was built adjacent to the church in 1950, as a memorial to the last catholic bishop of Hólar Jón Arason and his two sons, who were killed in 1550 as a result of their opposition to the reformation.

== See also ==
- List of cathedrals in Iceland
