= Lilleshall Abbey =

Ruined abbey in Shropshire, England

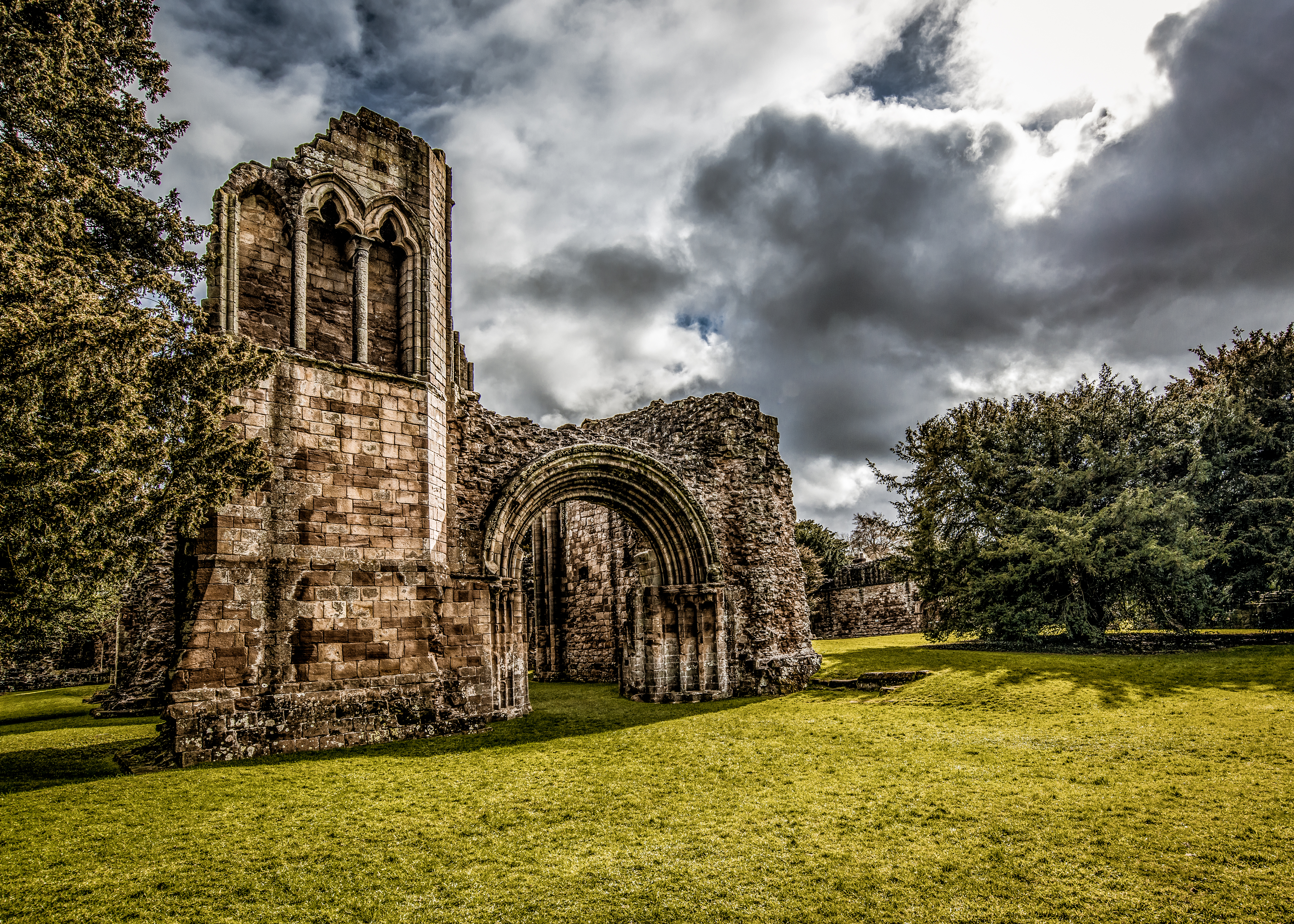
Lilleshall Abbey

Lilleshall Abbey was an Augustinian abbey in Shropshire, England, today located 6 miles (9.7 km) north of Telford. It was founded between 1145 and 1148 and followed the austere customs and observance of the Abbey of Arrouaise in northern France. It suffered from chronic financial difficulties and narrowly escaped the Dissolution of the Lesser Monasteries in 1536, before going into voluntary dissolution in 1538. The site is now in the care of English Heritage and is open all year round with free admission. Volunteers based at Haughmond Abbey regularly attend the site to deliver tours and conduct checks and maintenance. The site is open from 10am-6pm (Apr/Oct) and 10am-4pm (Nov/March). Guide books are on sale at the Haughmond Abbey Visitor Centre.

== Foundation ==
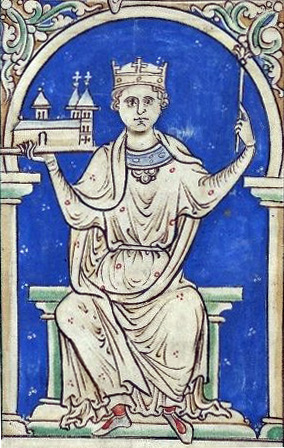
King Stephen, who reigned 1135–1154. He permitted the suppression of St Alkmund's College in Shrewsbury to fund the foundation of Lilleshall Abbey.

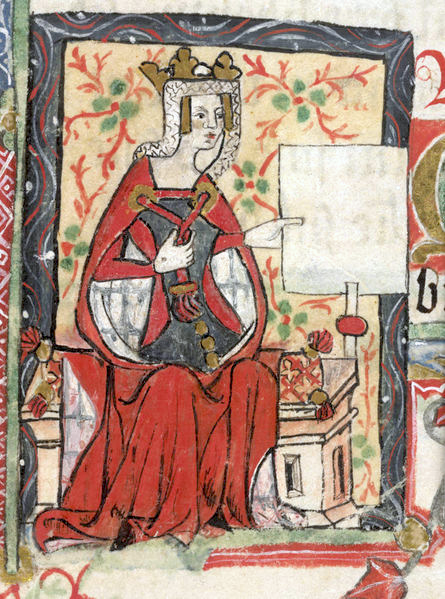
Empress Matilda, Stephen's rival for the throne. Without her consent, the existence of the abbey might have been threatened later.

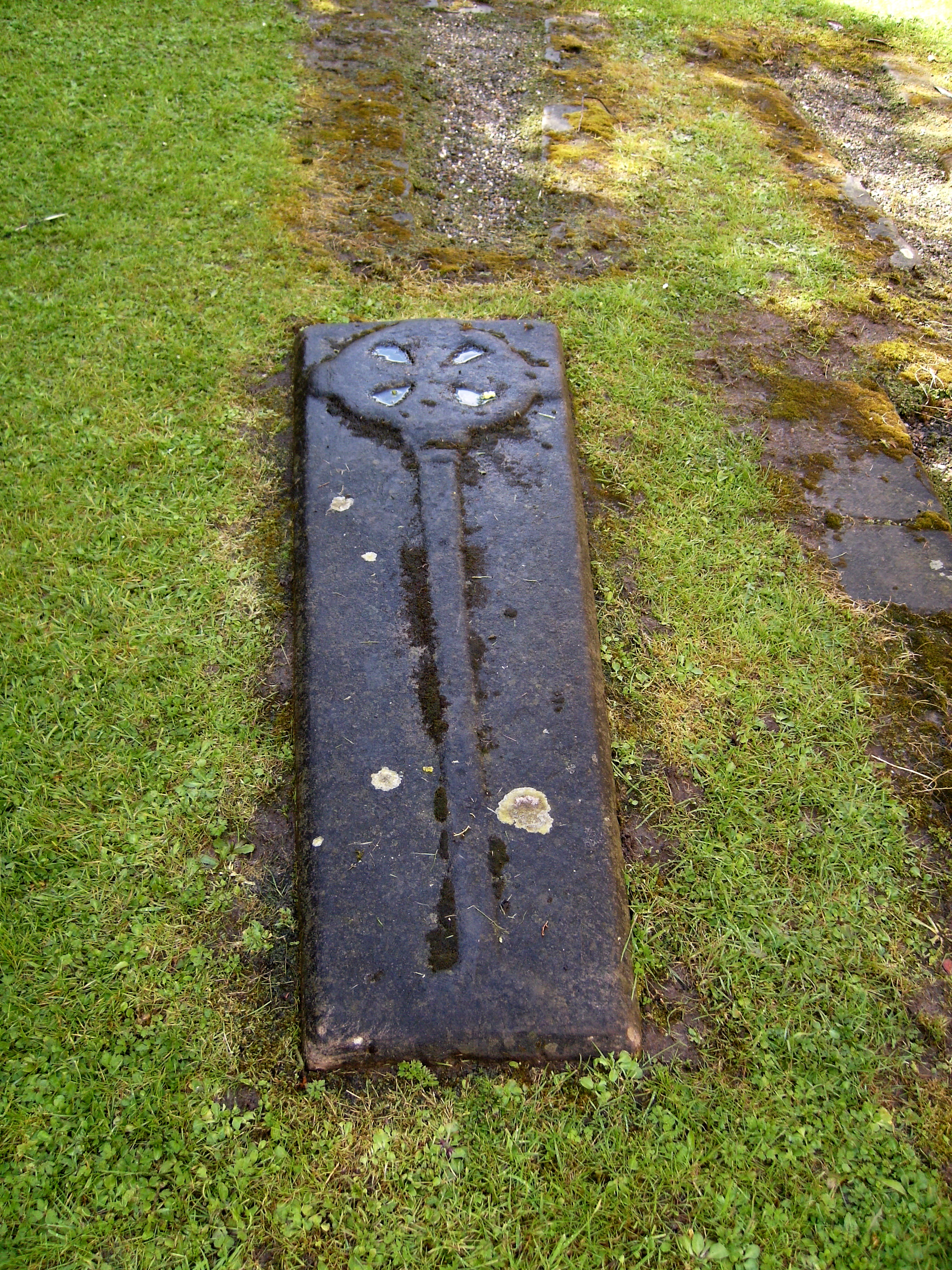
Tombstone to the south of the abbey building. A desire to be buried in sacred ground was a major motive for donations to Lilleshall Abbey.

=== Disputed origins ===
Lilleshall was one of a small number of monasteries in England belonging to the rigorist Arrouaisian branch of the Augustinians. A persistent tale, possibly stemming from William Dugdale, the pioneering 17th century historian of Britain's monasteries, claims that there was an Anglo-Saxon church at Lilleshall, dedicated to St Alkmund. Even Dugdale sounded a note of scepticism, and by 1825, when Hugh Owen and John Brickdale Blakeway wrote their history of Shrewsbury, the scepticism was dominant and they would allow only they “could not disprove” the existence of the Anglo-Saxon foundation. much less the even less plausible tale that Alkmund was actually buried at Lilleshall. It seems that legends of early Lilleshall have developed by confusion with the collegiate church of St Alkmund in Shrewsbury, which was dissolved to provide the funding for the abbey. More recent accounts, from Robert William Eyton's of 1856 to the Victoria County History of 1973, entirely skip the Anglo-Saxon period and set the origins of the monastery securely in the years 1145–8, during the reign of King Stephen. These accounts agree that Lilleshall was founded on the initiative of two brothers: Richard de Belmeis, at that time Archdeacon of Middlesex and dean of the college of St Alkmund in Shrewsbury, and Philip de Belmeis, lord of Tong, Shropshire. Both were nephews of Richard de Beaumis, a Bishop of London who had died in 1127, sons of his brother Walter. The younger Richard was later also to become Bishop of London.

=== The Arrouaisian pre-history ===
Arrouaise lay between Bapaume and Arras. Gosse, the 18th century historian of the community, portrays the region as bandit country in the early Middle Ages. He specifies the arrival in 1090 of Heldemar of Tournai and the German Conon or Kuno as the key event in the genesis of the Arrouaisians. Both were court chaplains of William the Conqueror who embraced the Augustinian Rule, and after William's death, set off across France to pursue a series of pilgrimages. Together with a local hermit called Roger or Ruggerius, they established a monastic cell and an oratory, dedicated to the Holy Trinity and St Nicholas. Around this grew a small community of ascetics who recognised Heldemar as their head or provost. Heldemar was murdered and Roger stabbed by a cleric, apparently attracted to the community, who was angered by their calls to penitence. After Heldemar's death on 13 January 1097, reports of miracles and the aura of martyrdom quickly led to recognition of his holiness, enhancing the status of the embryonic monastery. Only a few months later, Conon, his successor, successfully obtained confirmation of the monastery's foundation from Lambert, bishop of Arras. Under their third leader, Richer, Arrouaise Abbey developed relationships with the nobility of northern France, establishing a cemetery in which to inter their benefactors. However, it was under Gervais, a former secretary to Eustace III, Count of Boulogne, elected its head in 1121, that the Arrouaise community became an important reforming force within the Augustinian order.

Although regarded as a house of Augustinian Canons Regular, Arrouaise followed a stricter code of conduct than other Augustinians, modelled explicitly on that of the Cistercians from the time of Gervais. They soon became an international community, as houses were founded in other countries, modelled on the original monastery and termed Arrouaisian. The first such monastery in England was Dorchester Abbey, Oxfordshire, founded around 1140 by Alexander of Lincoln, the local bishop, who suppressed a college of secular clergy to make way for the regular canons.

=== The Belmeis initiative ===
The Belmeis brothers had acquired land and influence in Shropshire and the surrounding counties mainly as heirs to their uncle, the bishop of London, who had overseen the affairs of Wales and the Welsh Marches on behalf of Henry I Philip was his secular heir and the king transferred many of his ecclesiastical holdings to Richard.

The initiative of the Belmeis brothers was far from inevitable. Earlier, Philip had been deeply interested in Buildwas Abbey, which was affiliated to the Congregation of Savigny (and later absorbed into the Cistercian Order). He was admitted to the Savignac lay fraternity and made a gift of land at Ruckley, near Tong, in return for himself and his wife being commemorated in perpetuity in the prayers of Savignac communities. However, in the early 1140s he gave land at Lizard, Staffordshire, “to found a Church in honour of St. Mary for Canons of the Order of Arrouase, who had come from the Church of St. Peter at Dorchester, and are serving God and St Mary there.” He gave the canons the right to collect wood for fuel and for building and also donated two Leicestershire churches – at Blackfordby and Ashby-de-la-Zouch.

The small colony of canons from Dorchester struggled to establish themselves. Lizard proved unsuitable, so they moved first into Donnington Wood, near Wrockwardine, and then to their final home at Lilleshall, a move that was complete by 1148. This was expedited by Richard Belmeis, who seems to have been considerably younger than his brother and had been ordained as a deacon in order to take full possession his offices and estates only in 1128. These included the deanery of St Almund's and four of its wealthy prebends: Lilleshall, Atcham, Uckington and Preston Gubbals. At the Domesday survey these had been in the possession of a Norman priest called Godebold (after whom Preston Gubbals is named), apparently a crony of the regional magnate, Roger Montgomery. It is likely Gobold's son Robert continued this loyalty to the Montgomery dynasty and lost his inheritance by supporting the revolt of Robert of Bellême, as the estates passed to the elder Richard de Belmeis and then to his nephew. The young Richard devised a radical scheme to dissolve the ancient college of secular canons and divert the wealth of its deanery and prebends to the new Arrouaisian community of regular canons - a parallel to the foundation of Dorchester Abbey.

The country was in the grip of the Anarchy of King Stephen's reign, so great care was taken to ensure assent from a range of powerful interested parties. The changes at St Alkmund's, a chapel royal, necessitated a charter from King Stephen, which he granted in 1145 at Bury St Edmunds. This confirmed Richard's donation of all his holdings to the canons at Donington Wood and also promised the remaining prebends as they fell vacant. The very eminent witnesses included Imar of Tusculum the Papal Legate of Lucius II; Robert de Bethune, the bishop of Hereford; Rotrou de Warwick, the bishop of Évreux; William de Warenne, 3rd Earl of Surrey and Robert of Ghent, Stephen's Chancellor. Pope Lucius died shortly afterwards and his successor, Pope Eugenius III, a Cistercian, was a friend of Bishop Alexander, the great patron of the Arrouaisians in England, whom he received twice in successive years. He ordered Roger de Clinton, the Bishop of Coventry and Lichfield, to issue a charter confirming Richard's gift to the canons and Theobald of Bec, the Archbishop of Canterbury, subsequently also issued a confirmatory charter, this time mentioning that the foundation is to be an abbey in the woods at Lilleshall.

To ensure the abbey's future, it was vital to secure the approval of Empress Matilda, who was contesting the throne. Richard de Belmeis had previous contact with the opposition and was with Matilda at Oxford in 1141, when he witnessed her charter to Haughmond Abbey. She issued a confirmation, now definitely to Lilleshall Abbey, in 1148, apparently at Falaise. Her son and heir gave his consent as Duke of Normandy and again when he became King Henry II.

The abbey was seen as a royal foundation, notwithstanding the role of the Belmeis brothers, because it replaced St Alkmund's, a chapel royal. This gave it both advantages and responsibilities. Philip of Belmeis' property passed via his daughter to the la Zouche family, who occasionally pretended to have advowson. In practice, however, all abbots elect were presented for approval to the king.

== Dedication ==
The dedication of the abbey was to Mary, as the first charter of Philip de Belmeis implied. This is confirmed by the abbey seal used in the 13th century, which is inscribed: SIGILLUM E[CCL]ESIE BEATE MARIE DE LILLESHULL - The Seal of the Church of St Mary of Lilleshall.

== The monastic life ==
The abbey's community were Augustinian Canons Regular or conventual canons, not technically monks. Although the Arrouaisians were at first noted for their austerity of life, they were less enclosed than Benedictine or Cistercian monks. Arrouaisian houses were noted for the high quality of their liturgical observance. A prayer roll of about 1375 confirms that this was so at Lilleshall more than two centuries after the foundation.

There was a large number of benefactions from lay landowners and these often came with requests to be buried or prayed for at Lilleshall or for membership of the fraternity of the abbey. Late in the 12th century, for example, John Lestrange, a local baron with holdings further afield, got into a dispute with Ramsey Abbey over the church at Holme-next-the-Sea in Norfolk. In a settlement acceptable to all, he gave the church to Lilleshall Abbey, for the health of his own and his wife's souls. Shortly afterwards he added the church at Shangton in Leicestershire, adding specifically “the body of his wife Amicia when she shall have gone the way of all flesh.” Similarly, Robert de Kayley gave the abbey two thirds of his land at Freasley, in Dordon, Warwickshire, on condition that it accept his body for burial. This suggests that its monastic life quickly built up a reputation for holiness that could be acquired by proximity, and one that clearly persisted into the later Middle Ages. John of Gaunt, 1st Duke of Lancaster, spent two days at the abbey, together with his wife Katherine Swynford and a large retinue. He had fallen ill after the 24th parliament of Richard II's reign was held at Shrewsbury, dissolving on 31 January 1398. Gaunt himself, his wife, and his squire, William Chetwynd, were received into the fraternity, and Gaunt made a gift of twenty pounds of gold.

Although the fraternity was important in diffusing the influence of the abbey, there is no evidence of lay brothers and sisters being admitted to the abbey community itself. This is unexpected as the Abbey of Arrouaise had admitted lay members at least since the time of Abbot Gervais. There were many employees, however. In the mid-15th century, there were over twenty household servants, including two porters, a butler, a chamberlain, two cooks, a baker, a bell-ringer, a cobbler, and washerwoman, as well as a carpenter and a group of apprentices to carry out repairs. There was a tannery on the premises, as well as a brewery. Self-sufficiency was an important feature of Arrouaisian houses. Arrouaise itself had a similar but even larger and more differentiated lay labour force.

The canons were much employed in managing the abbey's substantial estates, which seem to have been worked mainly by indentured servants and later by wage labour. A fairly high proportion of the abbey's land was kept in demesne, cultivated from granges. The Lilleshall estate alone had four of these and there was a ring of further granges in Shropshire and Staffordshire, with two outlying at Blackfordby and Grindlow. The grange at Blackfordby seems to have absorbed a good deal of time and labour, with canons often staying there. There was even a chapel on site, with mass said three times a week. This was strictly irregular, as it was considered perilous to the soul for a canon to reside anywhere alone, and there were complaints about it from the Bishop of Lichfield. However, the nature of the abbey's estates meant that canons would often require leave to travel. Both this and the increasingly unfavourable agrarian conditions and labour market of the 14th century meant that direct exploitation of demesnes was gradually reduced in favour of leasing out land.

The abbey was not noted for its intellectual life. However, there was some kind of library and a copy of a chronicle ascribed to Peter of Ickham has survived from it, with additions made locally. There is also evidence of a canon being licensed to study at university for 10 years from 1400.

John Mirk, a Lilleshall canon of the late 14th and early 15th centuries did make a literary mark. He wrote in the local West Midland dialect of Middle English and at least two of his works were widely copied and used. Festial is a collection of homilies for the festivals of the Liturgical year as it was celebrated in his time in Shropshire. Instructions for Parish Priests is in lively vernacular verse, using octosyllabic lines and rhyming couplets throughout. Mirk intended to ensure that priests had the resources to give good counsel to their flock. The existence of such works suggests that the canons were actively engaged with the liturgical and pastoral work of their region, if not at the highest scholarly level.

== Wealth and endowments ==
The monastic life at Lilleshall Abbey was funded by a portfolio of lands and other properties built up mainly over the first century of its existence. Initially very concentrated in the area around the abbey, it grew to include much more widely scattered estates. The following list is drawn from the Victoria County History, with references to further online sources where available.

Location	Donor or original owner	Nature of property	Approximate coordinates
Lilleshall manor	Originally a prebend of St Alkmund's held by Richard de Belmeis, transferred to the abbey on his instigation by the Crown	Landed estate, held in demesne by the abbey throughout its history. It contained four granges: Cheswell, Watling Street, Wealdmoor, and the home grange	52°43′47″N 2°23′57″W
Atcham	Prebend of St Alkmund's, held by Richard de Beaumis from the outset.	Landed estate and site of a grange. It had a ferry across the River Severn, replaced by toll bridge from the early 13th century, and later a fulling mill. From 1269 a three-day fair was held here, starting on the feast of St Egidius (1 September), and from 1276 a similar fair starting on the feast of St Augustine of Canterbury (26 May)	52°40′42″N 2°40′46″W
Albrightlee	Prebend of St Alkmund's, recovered in 1273, after protracted legal conflict, from the Burnell family, who occupied the abbey itself in revenge at one point. A grange was built here.	Landed estate	52°44′52″N 2°42′21″W
Charlton, near Shawbury	Prebend of St Alkmund's	Landed estate, where Lilleshall Abbey established a grange, while some of the land was retained by the Charlton family as tenants, a situation that led to repeated legal conflict.	52°48′02″N 2°38′07″W
Dinthill, near Ford, Shropshire	Prebend of St Alkmund's	Landed estate. Defended in 1203 against a legal action by John of Dinthill, who lost the case because he confused an assize of mort d'ancestor with an assize of novel disseisin.	52°42′32″N 2°50′53″W
Hencott	Prebend of St Alkmund's	Small landed estate, close to Shrewsbury Castle	52°43′56″N 2°45′38″W
Longdon-on-Tern	Prebend of St Alkmund's.	Landed estate. A grange was sited here. The Sugdon family continued to give lands her to the abbey, consolidating its estate. However, there were numerous conflicts with other neighbouring landowners in the manor, including Buildwas Abbey, Hamo Lestrange and the Burnells. In 1282 a payment of 400 marks to Thomas Withington, husband of Isabel Burnell, settled the most important dispute over lordship of the manor.	52°44′04″N 2°33′36″W
Preston Gubbals	Prebend of St Alkmund's, held by Godebold at Domesday	Landed estate and site of a grange. Included a subsidiary estate called Charlton.	52°46′21″N 2°45′18″W
Preston Montford	Prebend of St Alkmund's	Landed estate, recovered from Robert de Boulers, lord of Montgomery, who quitclaimed it in late 12th century and acknowledged that his family had held it unjustly.	52°43′25″N 2°50′27″W
Uckington, Shropshire	Prebend of St Alkmund's.	Landed estate and site of grange and a mill. The abbey progressively acquired property here, including the fishery. William FizAlan II's addition of land from his Wroxeter demesne led to a dispute between the abbey and his brother and successor, John.	52°41′06″N 2°37′33″W
Wistanstow	Prebend of St Alkmund's	Although an ancient possession of St Alkmund's, Hugh of Montgomery, 2nd Earl of Shrewsbury persuaded the canons to postpone taking control and it fell into lay hands. The abbey was able to re-establish nominal overlordship, although the estate remained under control of its terre tenants, the Stapletons, who ensured the abbey received 40 shillings a year from the church.	52°27′55″N 2°50′14″W
Lizard Grange	Granted by Philip de Belmeis.	Landed estate. Originally intended for the abbey site, it became an agricultural holding with a grange.	52°41′18″N 2°18′57″W
Ashby-de-la-Zouch	Philip de Belmeis	Advowson of the St Helen's Church, land and tithes.	52°44′50″N 1°28′01″W
Blackfordby	Philip de Belmeis	Advowson of the Church of St Margaret of Antioch, land and tithes. A grange was established here.	52°45′35″N 1°30′42″W
Poulton, Wiltshire	Robert de Boulers	Advowson of the Church of St Mary	51°42′18″N 1°51′29″W
Arkendale in Yorkshire	Hilary Trusbut, widow of Robert de Boulers, to establish a chantry for herself and her husband.	Land	54°02′37″N 1°24′33″W
Braunston in Northamptonshire	Part of Hilary Trusbut's grant.	Land	52°17′31″N 1°12′32″W
Holme-next-the-Sea in Norfolk	John Lestrange, in settlement of a dispute with Ramsey Abbey.	Advowson and tithes of the church.	52°57′40″N 0°32′25″E
Shangton in Leicestershire	John Lestrange, so that his wife, Amicia, could be buries at Lilleshall.	Advowson and tithes of the Church of St Nicholas.	52°33′26″N 0°56′46″W
Freasley, Warwickshire	Robert de Kayley, in return for burial at Lilleshall.	Land	52°35′50″N 1°38′46″W
Grindlow in Derbyshire	Matthew of Stoke, confirmed in a charter of King John.	Landed estate which became site of a grange.	53°17′43″N 1°43′44″W
Moreton Say	Nicholas of Bletchley	Bletchley mill	52°54′21″N 2°33′06″W
Bridgnorth	Sybil of Linley	Property	52°32′02″N 2°25′04″W
Shackerley in Donington, Shropshire	Robert de Wodecote	Land	52°39′18″N 2°16′31″W
Orslow, Staffordshire	Millicent, widow of Robert de Wodecote	Land	52°44′10″N 2°17′16″W
Berwick Juxta Attingham	Hugh Malvoisin	Tithes	52°41′36″N 2°40′36″W
Wroxeter	William FitzAlan	Land, adjacent to the Uckington estate, later the subject of a property dispute.	52°40′09″N 2°38′47″W
Nantwich	Robert Bardolf	Salt pans	53°04′11″N 2°31′30″W
Crabwall, near Chester	Roger de Meingaryn (also Mesnilwarin or Mainwaring)	Land	53°13′06″N 2°55′24″W
Burlington in Sheriffhales	Helewise, daughter of Reyner of Burlington	Land, a short distance from Lilleshall, but a grange was built here.	52°41′53″N 2°20′02″W
Cold Hatton	William Wishart	Landed estate. The entire vill, held by Wishart in capite, was donated around 1260 and the grant confirmed by Henry II	52°47′11″N 2°33′33″W
Boningale	Hugh of Boningale, who wanted sanctuary at Lilleshall for his family in time of war	Land	52°37′16″N 2°16′55″W
Tern in Atcham		Small property	52°41′07″N 2°39′57″W
Loppington		Small property	52°51′31″N 2°47′11″W
Eaton Constantine		Small property	52°39′10″N 2°35′38″W
Tibberton		Small property	52°46′42″N 2°28′18″W
Howle		Small property	52°48′30″N 2°27′32″W
Tong, Shropshire		Small property	52°39′49″N 2°18′08″W
Shrewsbury		Houses and burgages	52°42′28″N 2°45′15″W
Newport, Shropshire		Houses and burgages	52°46′09″N 2°22′43″W
Welshpool		Houses and burgages	52°39′35″N 3°08′50″W
Stafford		Houses and burgages	52°48′22″N 2°07′02″W
London	Geoffrey of Shangton, rector of Badminton, Gloucestershire	House near the Tower of London	51°30′36″N 0°04′33″W

In addition to the properties, the abbey had many important rights and concessions. Pope Alexander III exempted the abbey's demesne lands from payment of tithes. In 1269 the abbot was given the right to hold an annual fair at Atcham: lasting three days, it took place at the feast of St Giles, which is 1 September. Seven years later came the right to hold another fair at Atcham on the feast of St Augustine of Canterbury, 26 May.

The original core of St Alkmund's prebends and Belmeis family donations formed a concentration within Shropshire and Staffordshire. This was only slightly expanded by later grants. Significant parts of the abbey's holdings lay in Leicestershire and Derbyshire, where it was forced to maintain granges and to send canons. The major territorial magnates in the area, like the Fitzalans and Lestranges, made grants but these were quite small. They made much larger benefactions to Haughmond Abbey, which was only a short distance from Lilleshall, had a similar regime, and, not being a royal foundation, was much more responsive to their needs. A comparison with the distribution map of Haughmond's estates reveals that Lilleshall's was a more widely distributed estate, resulting in higher running costs and less local support.

== Difficulties and decline ==
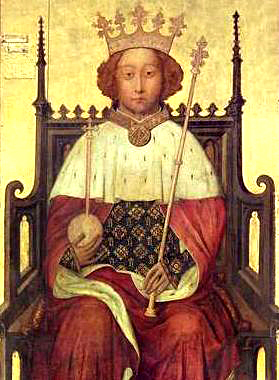
Richard II stayed at Lilleshall with Queen Isabella in January 1398 on his way to parliament at Shrewsbury.

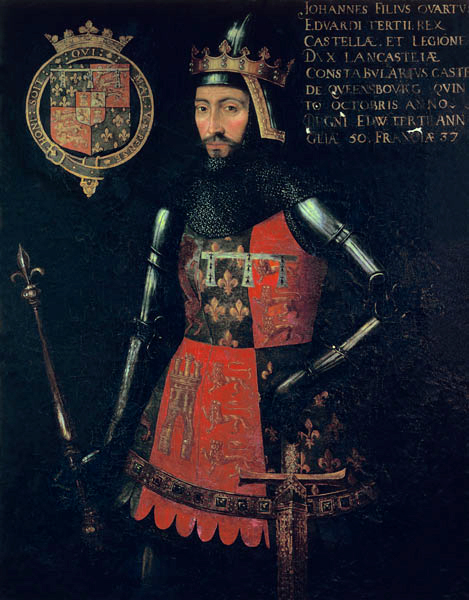
John of Gaunt, Richard II's uncle, stayed at Lilleshall with his wife, Katherine Swynford, only a week after the king, after falling ill at the end of the parliament.

The abbey was large and important among Augustinian houses and seems to have reached a zenith under Henry III. However, it was also from this time that it sometimes overstepped or abused its privileges. In 1221, for example, a jury at Shrewsbury complained that a servant of the abbot, Anian from Preston Gubbals, had been caught red-handed with loot from a robbery but had been extracted from gaol so that the abbot could try him in his own court. The jurors had no idea of the outcome of the case. However, relations with royal authority were generally good. In 1242 the king sent the abbot, then Richard of Shrewsbury, a gratuity of 20 marks. Three years later Henry stayed at the abbey on his way to Chester and the abbot gave 40 shillings towards the marriage of the infant Princess Margaret. Around the same time, a jury commissioned by John Biset, Justice in Eyre, decided the abbot need not expeditate his dogs (i.e. remove their claws), as his lands were originally of the royal demesne.

In 1292 Edward I called Abbot William of Bridgnorth to account for exceeding his privileges in numerous instances. It was alleged he held courts that dealt with Pleas of the Crown, serious matters reserved to royal courts. Moreover, he was holding fairs, markets and claiming free warren across his estates, although he had only limited rights to do so. Some of this the abbot sought to justify by reference to extant charters, some he denied, and some he sought to evade by claiming that the villages stipulated in the charges did not exist – apparently an attempt to exploit the loose spelling of the period. The outcome of the case is unknown.

Although it was well-endowed, the abbey had fallen into serious financial difficulties by the early 14th century. This coincided with the episcopate of Roger Northburgh, a very effective administrator and a zealous reformer, who sought out abuses all over the Diocese of Lichfield, and the incumbency of Abbot John of Chetwynd, a particularly turbulent cleric. Unlike the nearby White Ladies Priory, a community of Augustinian canonesses, where Northburgh made a litany of complaints about conduct and discipline, Lilleshall was criticised almost entirely for financial ineptitude and administrative weakness. Northburgh found the abbey heavily in debt and criticised the abbot for failing to consult widely enough about expenditure. He highlighted the large number of corrodies, waste of timber on abbey lands, the inefficiency of the brewer, negligence in distributing alms at the gate and the age and infirmity of the abbot.

The tenor of the bishop's complaints is surprising, as Chetwynd was often guilty of much worse than financial ineptitude. It seems that he maintained an armed retinue and he was not afraid to use it. In 1316 Vivian de Staundon robbed a royal official who was carrying a large sum of money to Ireland on behalf of Edward II Chetwynd, together with John Ipstones, a local baron, raised a large force of armed men to prevent Staundon's arrest and then sheltered him from justice, absorbing him into their own retinues. Warrants were issued for the arrest of both of them but, although Ipstones was apprehended, Chetwynd escaped and went to ground, evading several attempts to bring him to court, and the matter seems to have lapsed. In 1321 he again evaded justice by the simple expedient of not answering the summons, when the king prosecuted him for falsely claiming immunity from tolls and harbour dues in London. Despite his criminal history, when he retired in 1330, Chetwynd was allowed the revenues of two manors, Blackfordby and Freasley, and of two churches, as well as his food, fuel, candles, two horses, a capacious lodging at the abbey and hospitality for his guests. Even this was not enough for him: the disgruntled ex-abbot seized the abbey by force and pillaged it. The matter was only resolved when Edward III sent in keepers to restore order. This marked a low point in the reputation of the abbey.

The abbey's estates were large but very widely distributed. This made them expensive to work and manage, with stewards to pay at each grange. There were also underlying problems implicit in the abbey's status as a royal foundation. The problem of corrodies was intractable. These gifts of food and clothing were not alms but essentially pensions that could be purchased and they were regarded as perquisites for royal employees. Any servant of the king who asked would be given or sold a corrody, entitling them to basic maintenance for life, and many abbey servants were also given corrodies, which continued even after they finished working for the abbey. Abbots gave too many away and sold others too cheaply as favours. There was also a king's clerk to maintain unless a benefice could be found. Retired abbots expected an income and good quality accommodation.

John's successor, whom he apparently despised, was Henry of Stoke. He took steps to improve the abbey's finances. In particular, he retained the services of William of Shareshill, a talented lawyer, to maximise the abbey's income from its endowments. Shareshill was very successful and received the lease of Boningale as a reward. However, cattle disease in the 1330s and the first outbreak of the Black Death in 1348 struck hard. The labour shortage brought the community to its knees. Abbot Henry resigned in 1350 and in 1351 Edward III appointed Shareshill and William Banaster as custodians to restore solvency.

Richard II and Queen Isabella visited the abbey from 24 to 26 January 1398, on his way to the parliament at Shrewsbury. They were accompanied by five dukes, four earls, three bishops, and a French chamberlain. The cost to the abbey would have been huge, as these potentates would have been followed by an enormous retinue. John of Gaunt's indisposition a few days later brought unexpected relief, as he made a large monetary gift during his stay, as well as putting his influence at the abbey's disposal.

Finances probably recovered in the later 14th century and in the following century the abbey was fairly solvent. Revenues from particular estates were earmarked for specific purposes, generating a straightforward budget. The treasurer then had only limited discretion in spending the remainder. This system kept the abbey out of serious trouble for some decades. However, problems had set in again by 1518, when a canonical visitation by Bishop Geoffrey Blythe found debts of 1000 marks, with only 600 marks expected revenue. Blythe also criticised the attitude of the prior, the abbot's deputy, found that some canons were consorting with women of ill-repute and that there was no schoolmaster. He advised Abbot Robert Watson to weed out unnecessary staff. This he did and the abbey began to recover financially in its final years.

== Dissolution and after ==
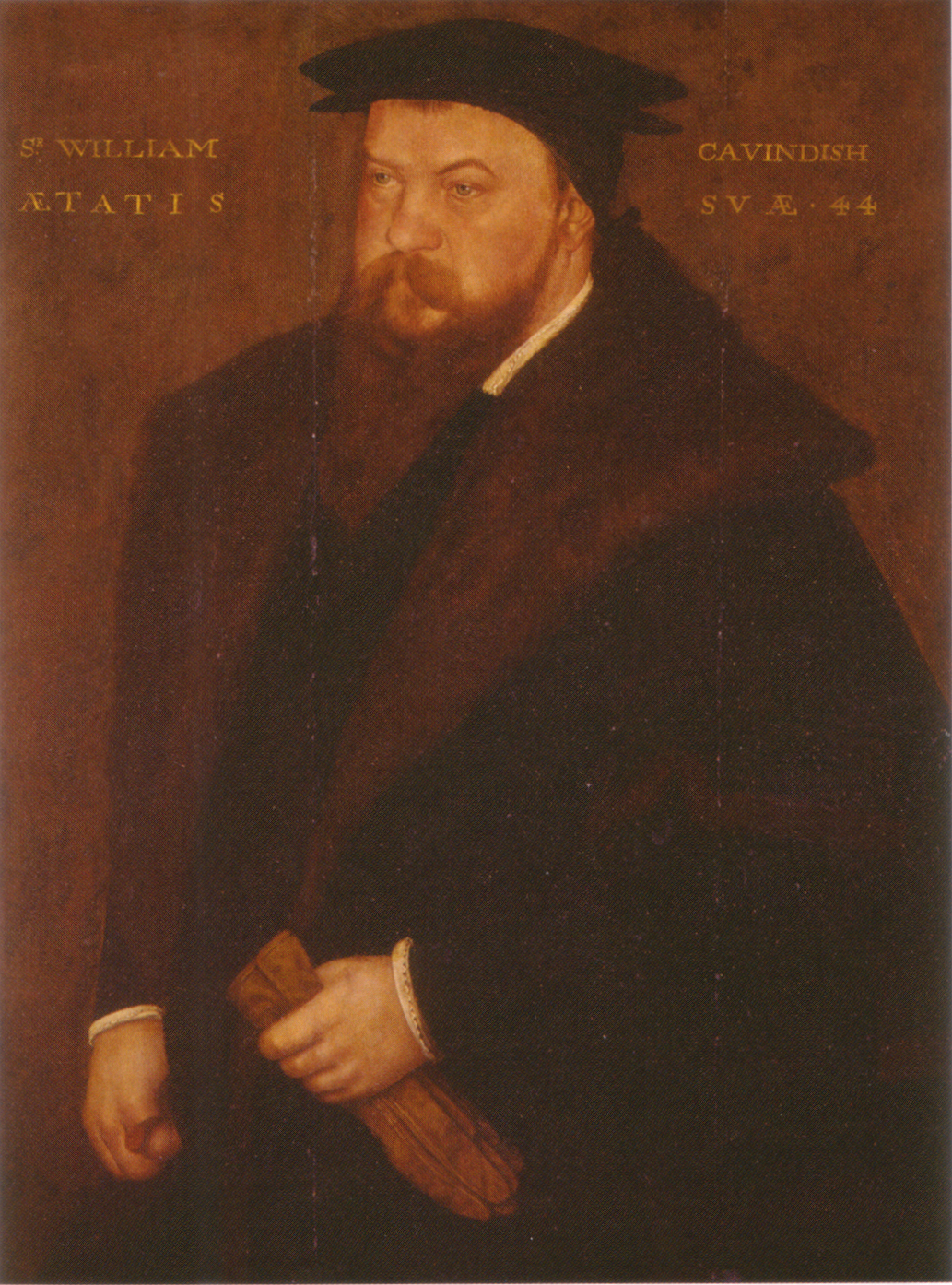
William Cavendish, the royal agent who took possession of the abbey in 1538.

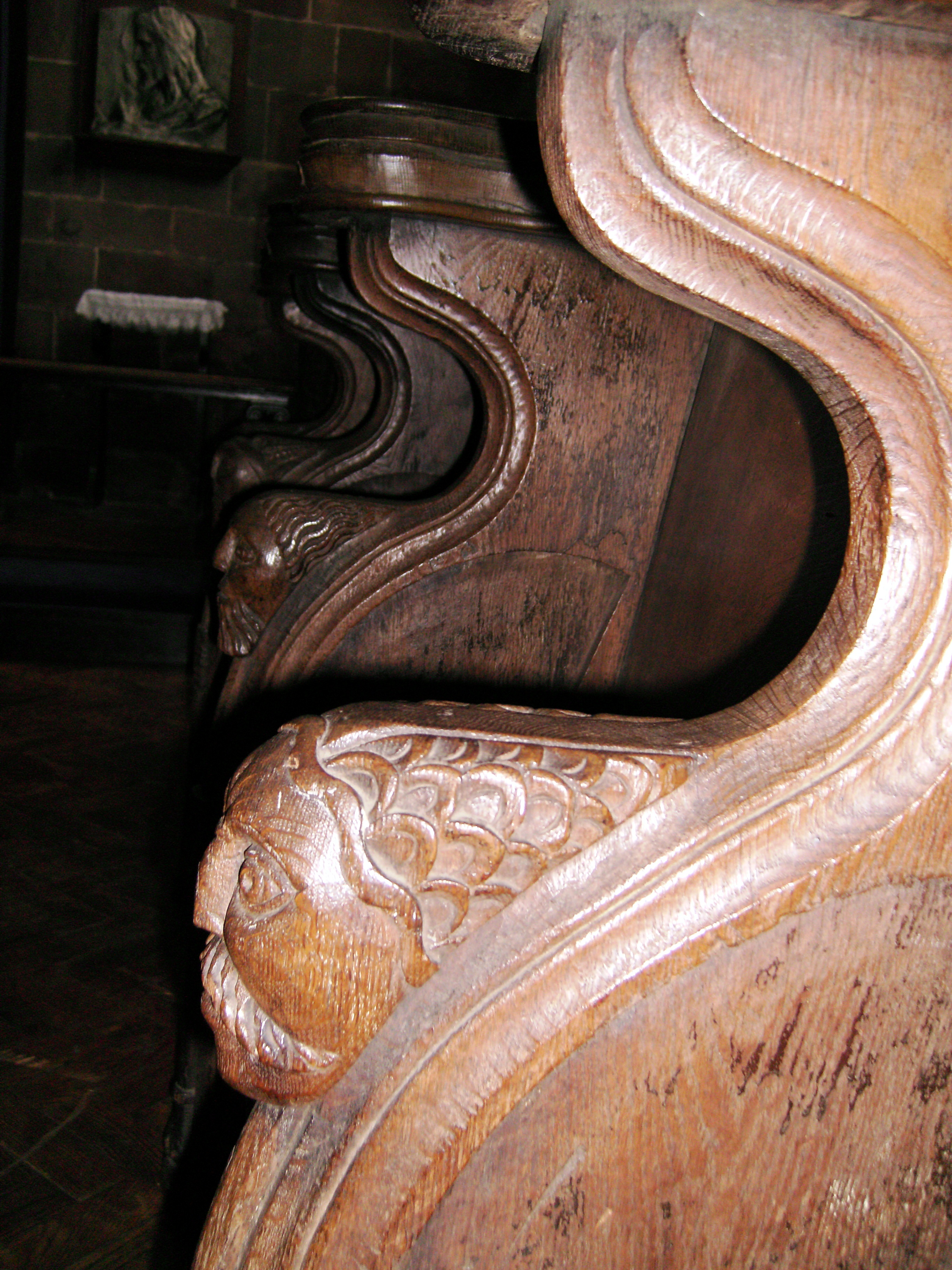
Carved choir stalls thought to come from Lilleshall Abbey in St Peter's Collegiate Church, Wolverhampton. James Leveson of Wolverhampton, who bought Lilleshall after the dissolution, was a prominent member of the congregation at St Peter's and lessee of its deanery lands.

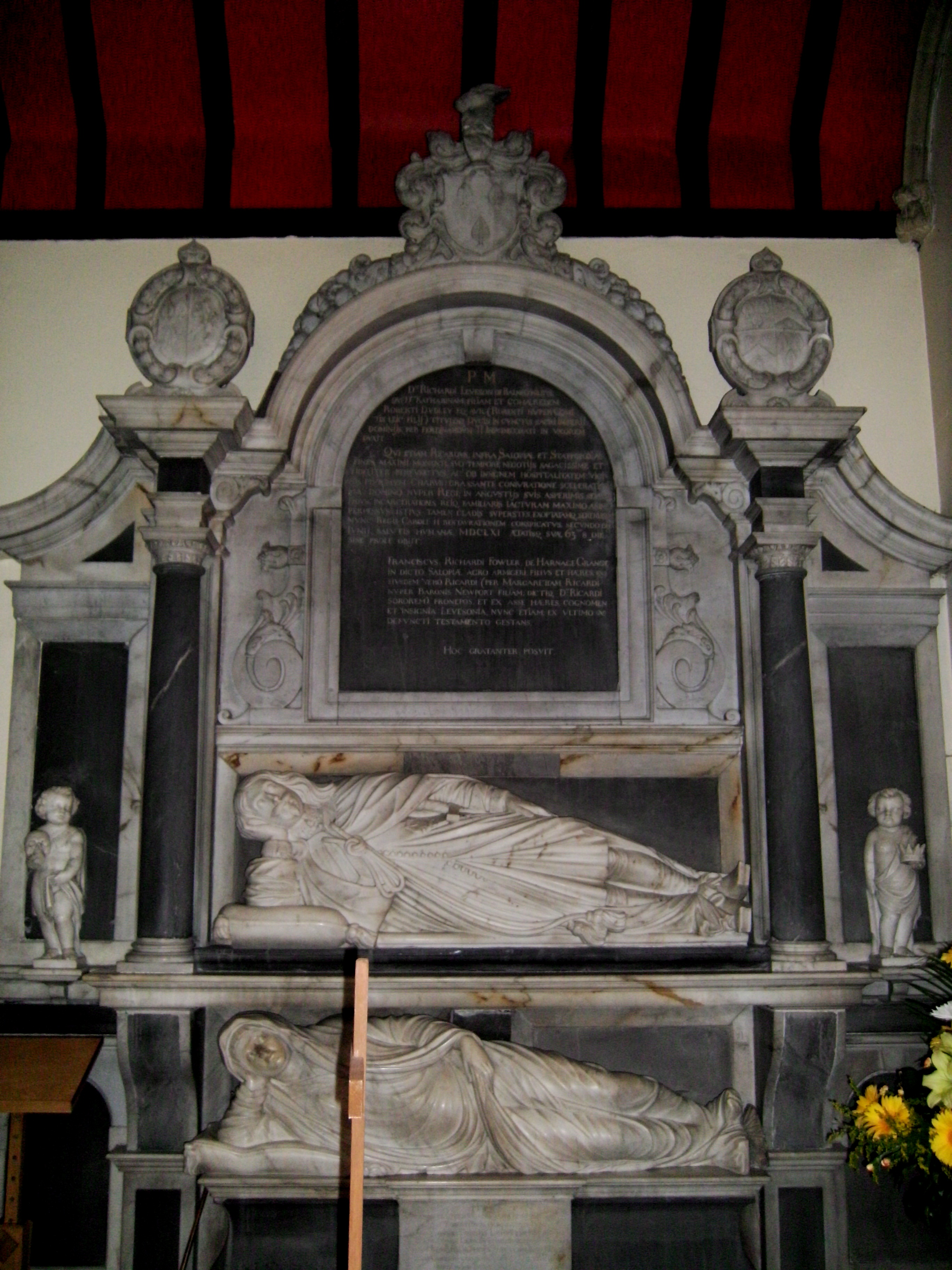
Memorial to Richard Leveson (1598–1661) and his wife Katherine Dudley. St Michael's church, Lilleshall, Shropshire.

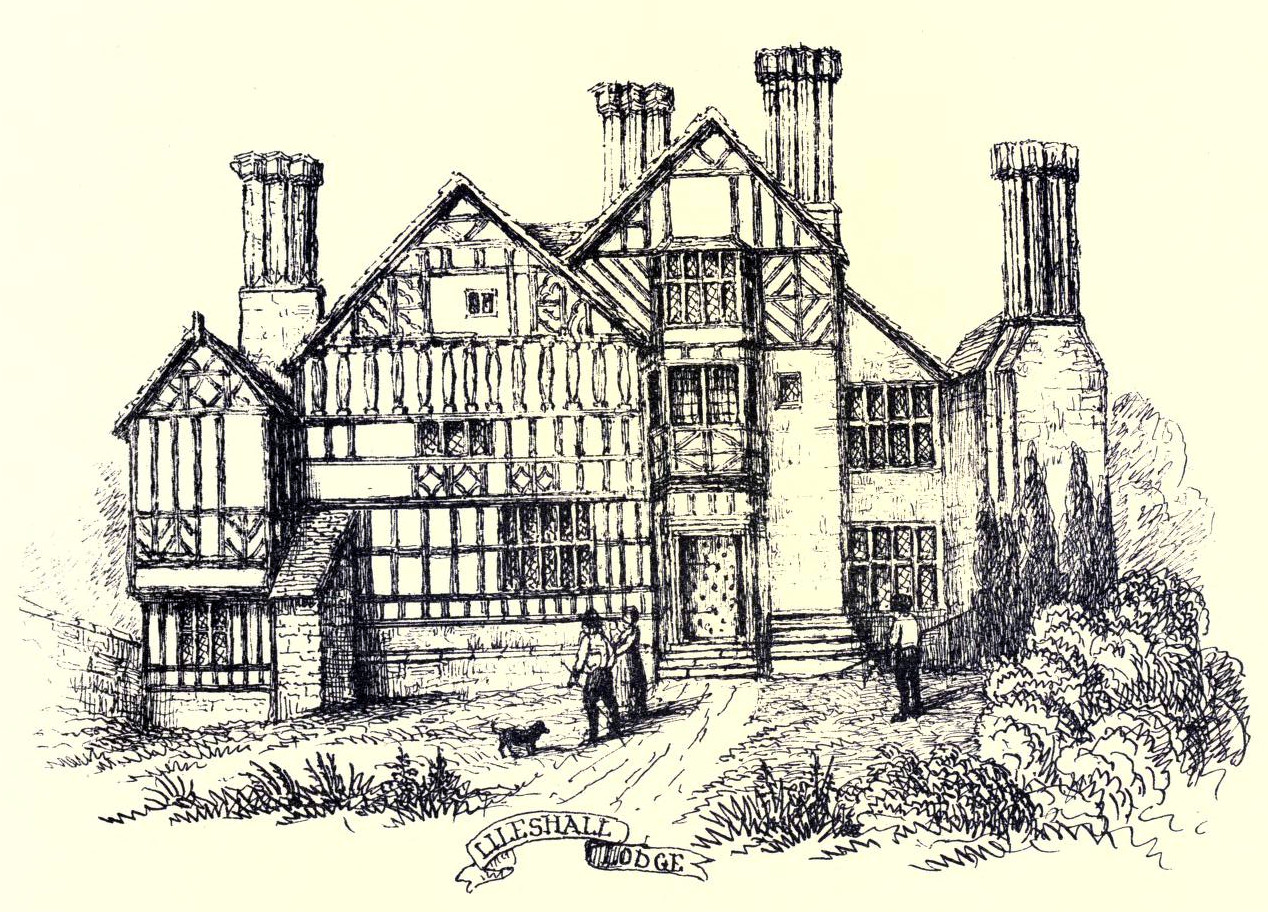
Lodge at Lilleshall Abbey, home of the Leveson family after the Dissolution of the Monasteries.

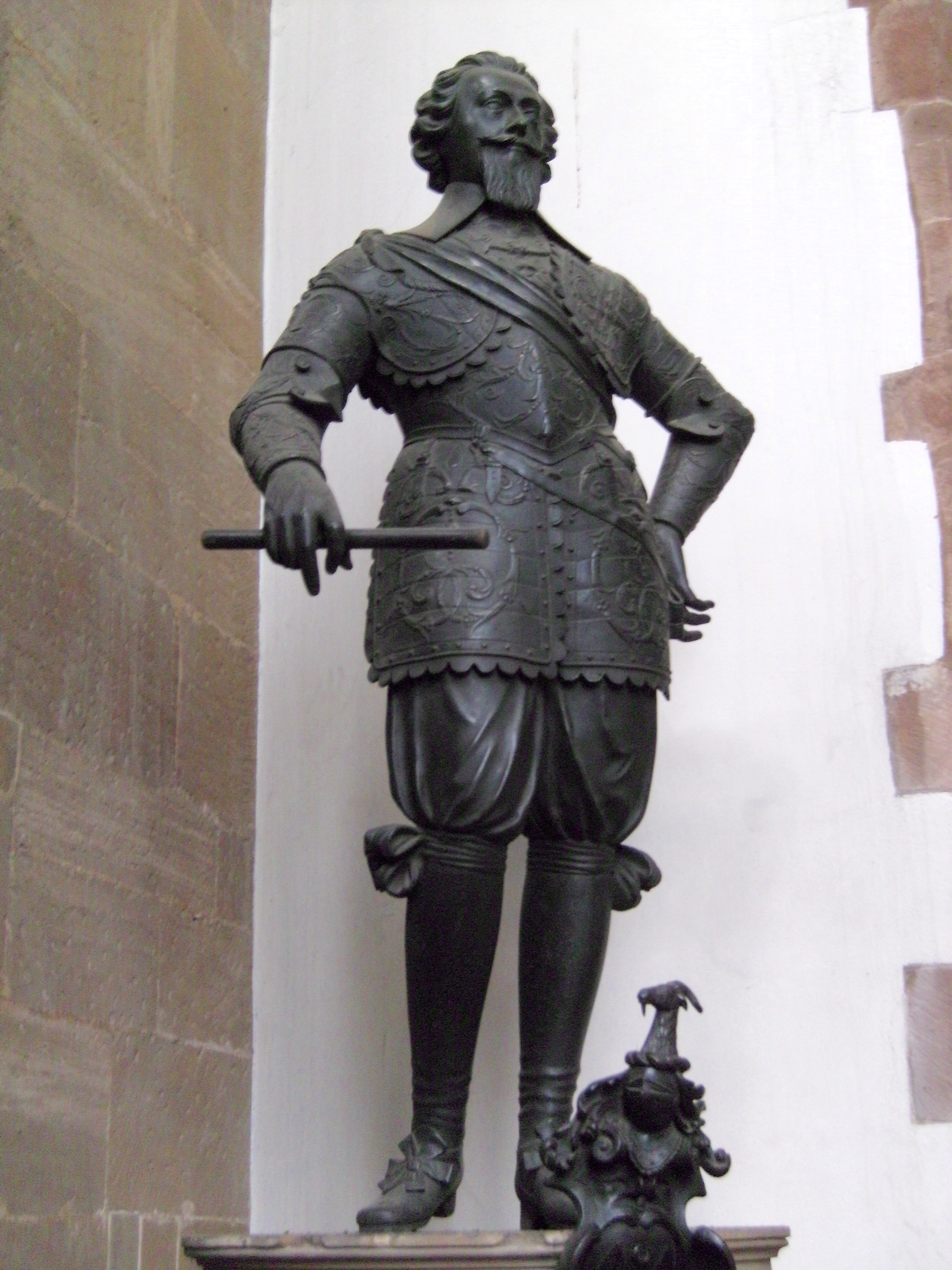
Statue of Vice Admiral Sir Richard Leveson (1570-1605) of Lilleshall, in St Peter's Collegiate Church.

Lilleshall was audited under the Valor Ecclesiasticus of 1535, preparatory to the Dissolution of the Lesser Monasteries Act of the following year. The gross income was found to be £324 0s. 10d., according to the Victoria County History: two pounds more according to Eyton. The high running costs brought this down to a net income of only £232 16s. 6d. – just above the £200 threshold set by the act. There were many expenses, including 40s. to the poor on Maundy Thursday and £4 on the Nativity of Mary (8 September) – both original bequests of Philip de Belmeis. However, lay officials, some very wealthy, drew large salaries: George Talbot, 4th Earl of Shrewsbury was paid £2 13s. 4d. to act as steward, Thomas Bromley £2 as auditor and Nicholas Cockerell a very substantial £6 13s. 4d. As receiver general. Officers at nearby Wombridge Priory, another Augustinian house, were fewer much less richly rewarded.

Lilleshall was not immediately dissolved but, like most of the marginal houses, surrendered itself to the king, before being compulsorily suppressed, on 16 October 1538. Henry VIII's agent, William Cavendish arrived on 16 October to take possession of the demesne lands and the abbey buildings. The abbey community was down to Abbot Robert Watson and ten canons. The gross revenue was found to be about £340 – a little more than in 1538, when the Lilleshall estate itself had been omitted. Watson was given a pension of £50 and the London house or, according to Walcott's transcription of the Court of Augmentations record, the “mansion of Longdon, wyth on acre of grounde ajoynyng to the seid mansion, and competente tymber for the reparacion of the samehouse, and also sufficient fyer woode duryng hys lyfe.” The canons were granted pensions of £5 to £6 each and a small lump sum as a “reward” on leaving – generally 50 shillings. The contents of the abbey and monastic buildings were sold and systematically listed as they were taken away, from liturgical items like altars and plate, to beds and bedding, pots and pans. The livestock, the small store of grain the hay were sold. Altogether, the sale of contents fetched £74 18s., although the bells, substantial amounts of plate and lead roofing remained initially unsold.

On 28 November the king granted the abbey site to Cavendish in fee farm. A year later, the site was sold to James Leveson (/ˈljuːsən/ LEW-sən), a rich Merchant of the Staple from Wolverhampton. The Levesons were closely associated with St Peter's Collegiate Church, and James Leveson had made some of his fortune by leasing the church's deanery and many of its prebendal lands. He sent choir stalls from the abbey to the church, where they can still be seen, now used as seating in the lady chapel. In 1543 Leveson bought the entire manor of Lilleshall from the Crown, creating a country estate for his family. He probably built or started the building of a lodge close to the abbey site as a family home. Leveson died in 1547, leaving the manor and the abbey to his son, Richard.

In the time of Richard's son, Walter Leveson (1551–1602), the family and its estates got into serious difficulties. Walter became involved in piracy against allied shipping in the North Sea. He suffered a series of huge fines and several spells in the Fleet Prison, as well as developing a persecutory delusion. By the time of his death, he was massively in debt. Richard, a noted admiral, was well aware of the desperate situation even before he inherited it. However, he had no time to improve matters, as he died without issue less than two years later, leaving still further massive debts, as he was accused of stealing the contents of a captured carrack. It was left to a cousin, John Leveson of Halling, Kent, to resolve the issue as trustee of the estate. He died in 1610, but his wife Christian took up the struggle. She improved the lodge, and when the Crown seized Lilleshall in 1616, she raised the money to lease it back. In 1623 she finally paid off all the debts. The abbey and manor passed later that year to another Sir Richard Leveson, John and Christian's son. A notable Cavalier in the English Civil War, in 1643 he fortified the site and installed a garrison of 160 men. Parliamentary forces besieged and bombarded the abbey. Before the garrison surrendered, the towers, lady chapel, and north transept were destroyed. After Sir Richard's death in 1661, the manor passed to his widow, Katherine, for life and then to his great nephew, William Leveson-Gower. Thereafter it became a seat of the Leveson-Gower family.

The Levesons had never lived full-time at Lilleshall, as they had numerous properties elsewhere. It was considered a hunting lodge or country retreat. Sir Richard was the only family head to be buried in Lilleshall village. In the 1750s a new Hall was built elsewhere on the estate. In 1820 this was replaced with a much more impressive Hall at the extreme east of the estate, near Sheriffhales, moving the centre of attention well away from the abbey site. Subsidence caused by large-scale mining damaged the walls of the building and much of the domestic ranges disappeared during the 19th century, although there were attempts to record the site early in the century and some archeology in 1891.

The abbey site is now in the hands of English Heritage. It is open all days, except some major public holidays, although the times of opening vary and should be checked on the English Heritage website. There is no admission charge.

== The abbey remains ==
The church was built in the 12th and 13th centuries. Its size and magnificence indicates it had wealthy benefactors; Henry III visited twice circa 1240. The surviving abbey buildings almost all date from the late 12th and early 13th centuries. Other buildings have been lost, but their foundations were partially recovered by excavations in the late 19th century. The central buildings stood in a much larger monastic precinct, enclosed by a stone wall and gates. Ancient yew trees are now an important feature of the site, particularly on the cloister side to the south. Care of the abbey remains was taken over by the Ministry of Public Building and Works in 1950. It is now in the guardianship of English Heritage.

The remains of the abbey church are still imposing, as the main walls still stand. Today they benefit from earlier maintenance and restoration: during the 1960s they had to be held up with timber because of mining subsidence. The church was cruciform and over 60 metres in length, with a stone vaulted roof. The north transept has almost disappeared.

Visitors are confronted by the still-impressive west front, with a wide central doorway, surmounted by a round arch. This western end was finished comparatively late, in the 13th century, and the round arch of the doorway is meant to complement the earlier work visible through the portal. The massive stonework on either side originally carried the weight of a great western tower, probably destroyed in the siege, along with the west window. The northern base has suffered least and still has arcading at the level of the vanished window sill, decorated in a trefoil pattern. The pointed gothic arches of its windows contrast sharply with the late romanesque gateway. Moving through the gateway, it is possible to climb a narrow staircase on the north wall of the nave to the level of the arcade, thus obtaining a good view of the remains of the church and of the landscape beyond. There is a small, well-preserved lavabo on the southern wall of the nave.

Two screens divided the length of the church: a rood screen and a pulpitum. Only the footings of both survive, although they are very clear. There are also foundations of two nave altars against the pulpitum. Beyond the screens, the chancel and presbytery are the oldest parts of the building, begun in the later 12th century. The only major subsequent alteration was the insertion of a large and impressive east window in the 14th century. This still dominates the church, as it was intended to do.

On the south wall, next to the transept, is a still-impressive processional entrance. The door pillars are surmounted by a segmental arch, and above that a round arch of three orders, the area between forming a tympanum. The entire exterior of the doorway is carved in a detailed zig-zag pattern, which was probably used widely around the building. Beyond this lay the cloister, from which the canons would enter the church in procession.

The cloister was a garden courtyard, surrounded by the domestic buildings of the abbey, mostly constructed in the late 12th century. The eastern buildings, adjoining the transept, are well-preserved, and it is possible to walk through the slype that gave access to the parlour, chapter house and possibly the infirmary. The south range is ruinous but the walls mainly survive. It contained the refectory, which was divided in the 14th century to provide a warming room. The range was much more complete in the early 19th century, when it still had most of its upper floor. This probably contained the abbot's lodging. There were many buildings further west and south, and the abbey's guest facilities must have been very large to accommodate visitors of very high status, with their enormous retinues.

Remains of the abbey buildings

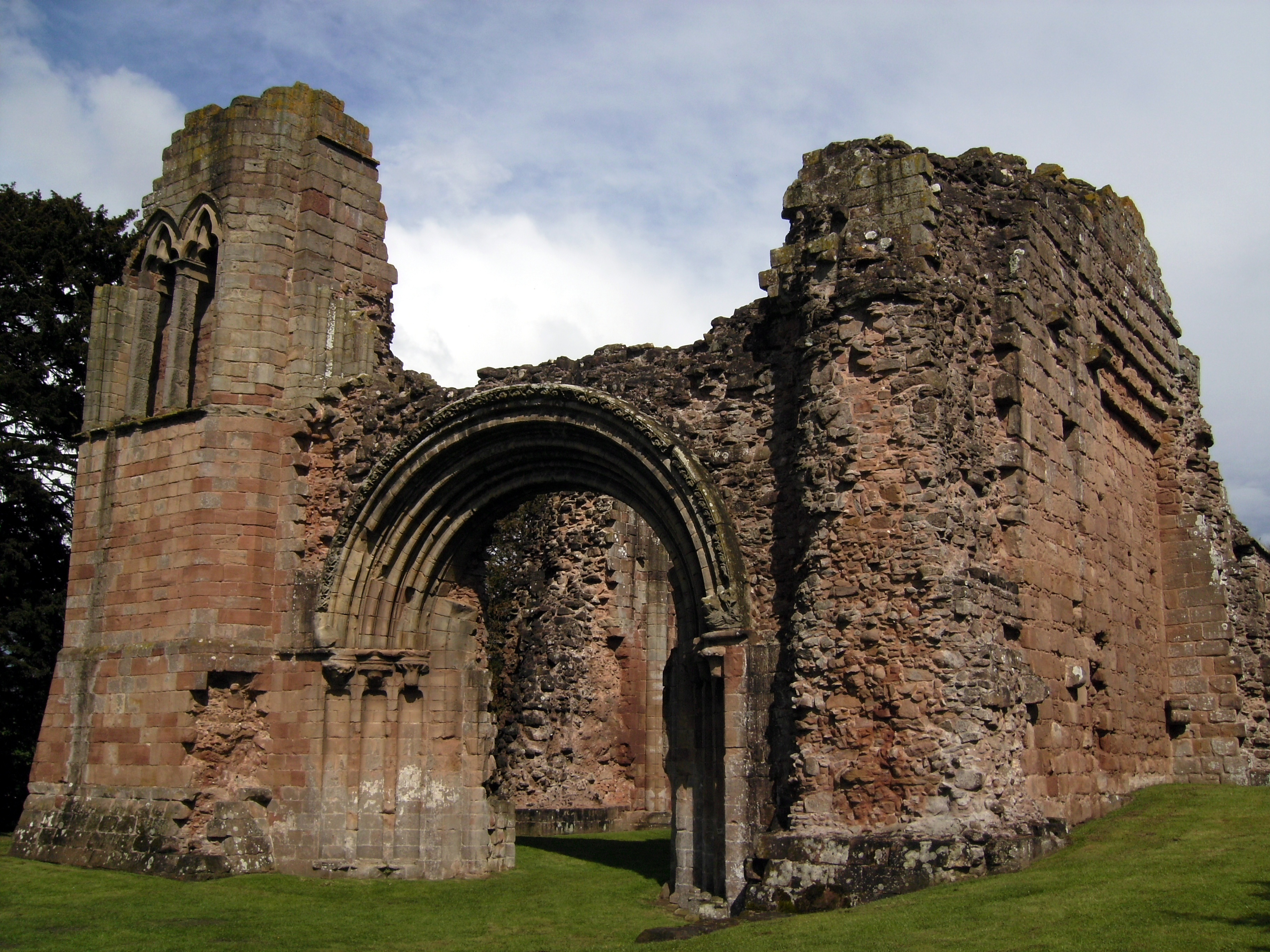
Western end of remains of the church, showing the main west portal and the still-massive northern support for the tower.

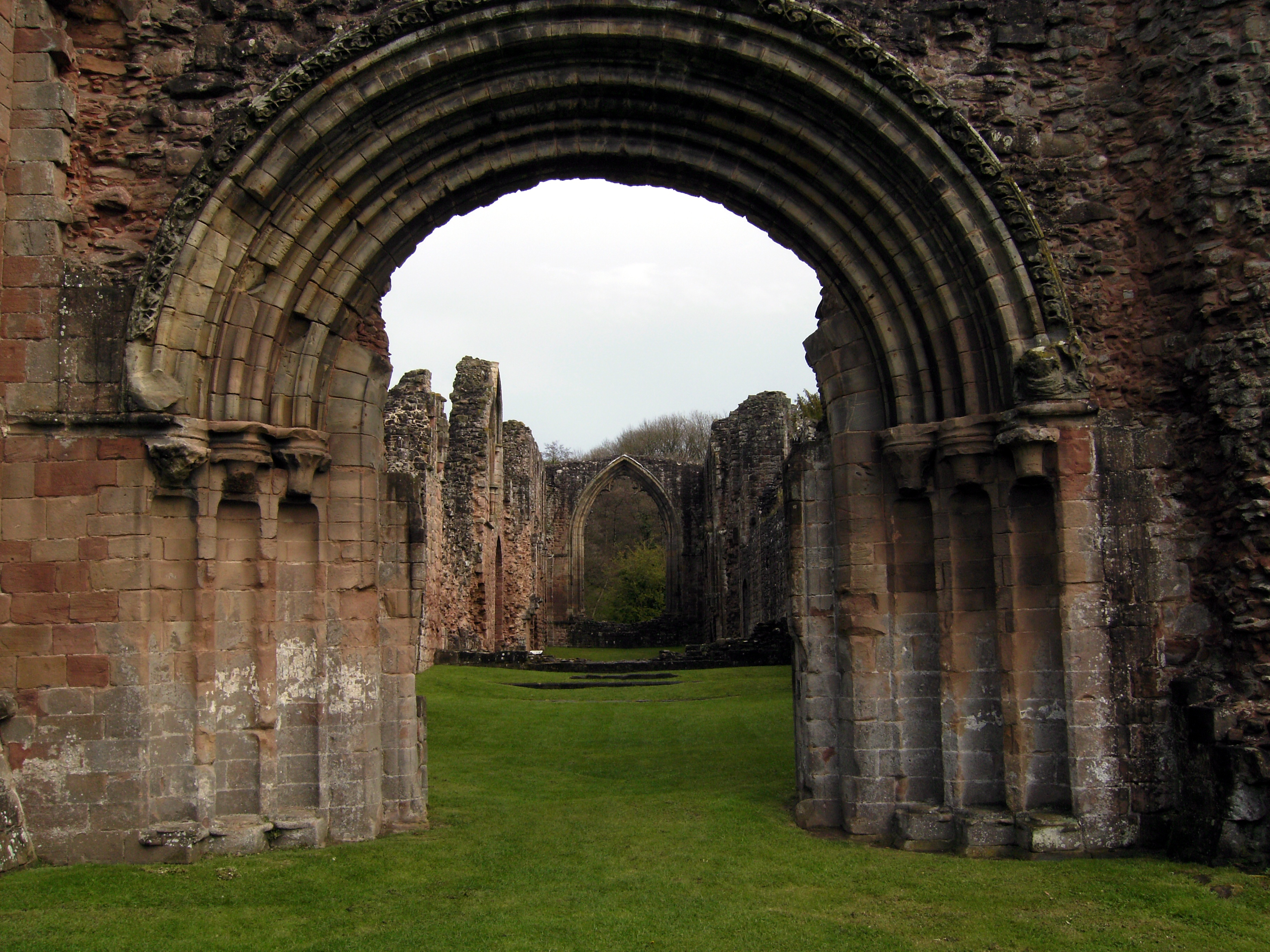
The main west portal of the abbey church.

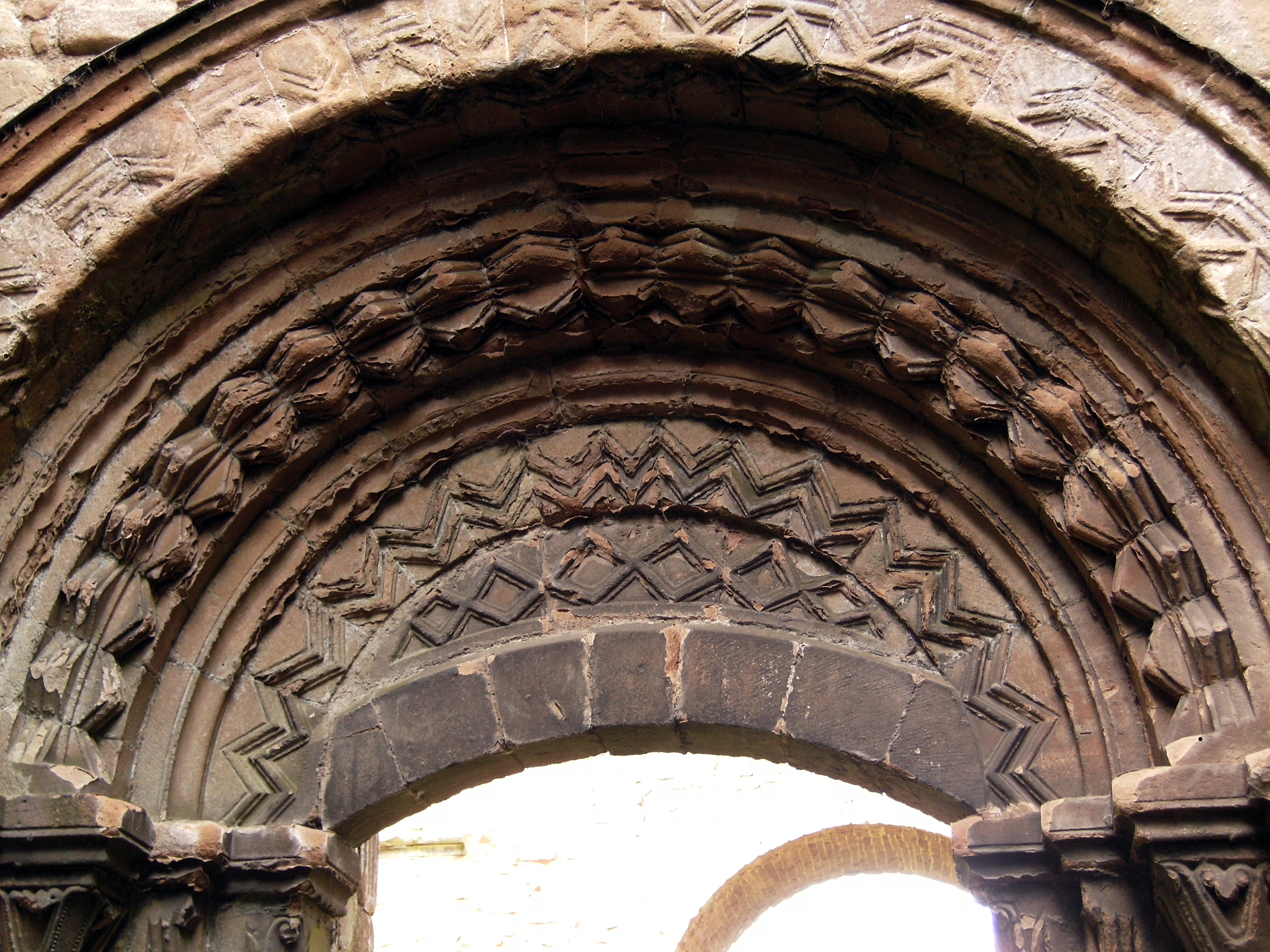
Arch and tympanum over the processional entrance on south side of the church.

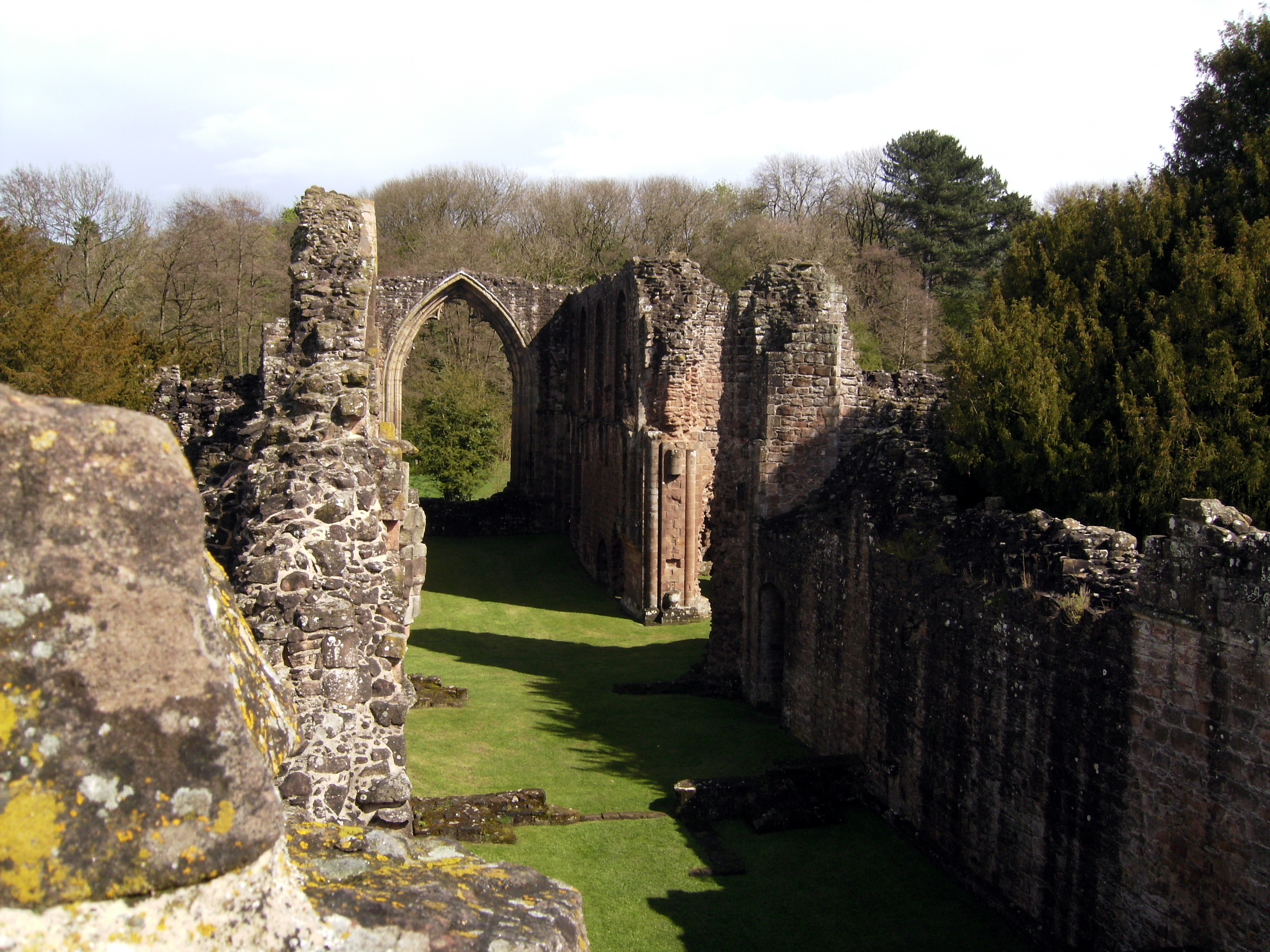
View of the remains of the abbey church interior from gallery level.

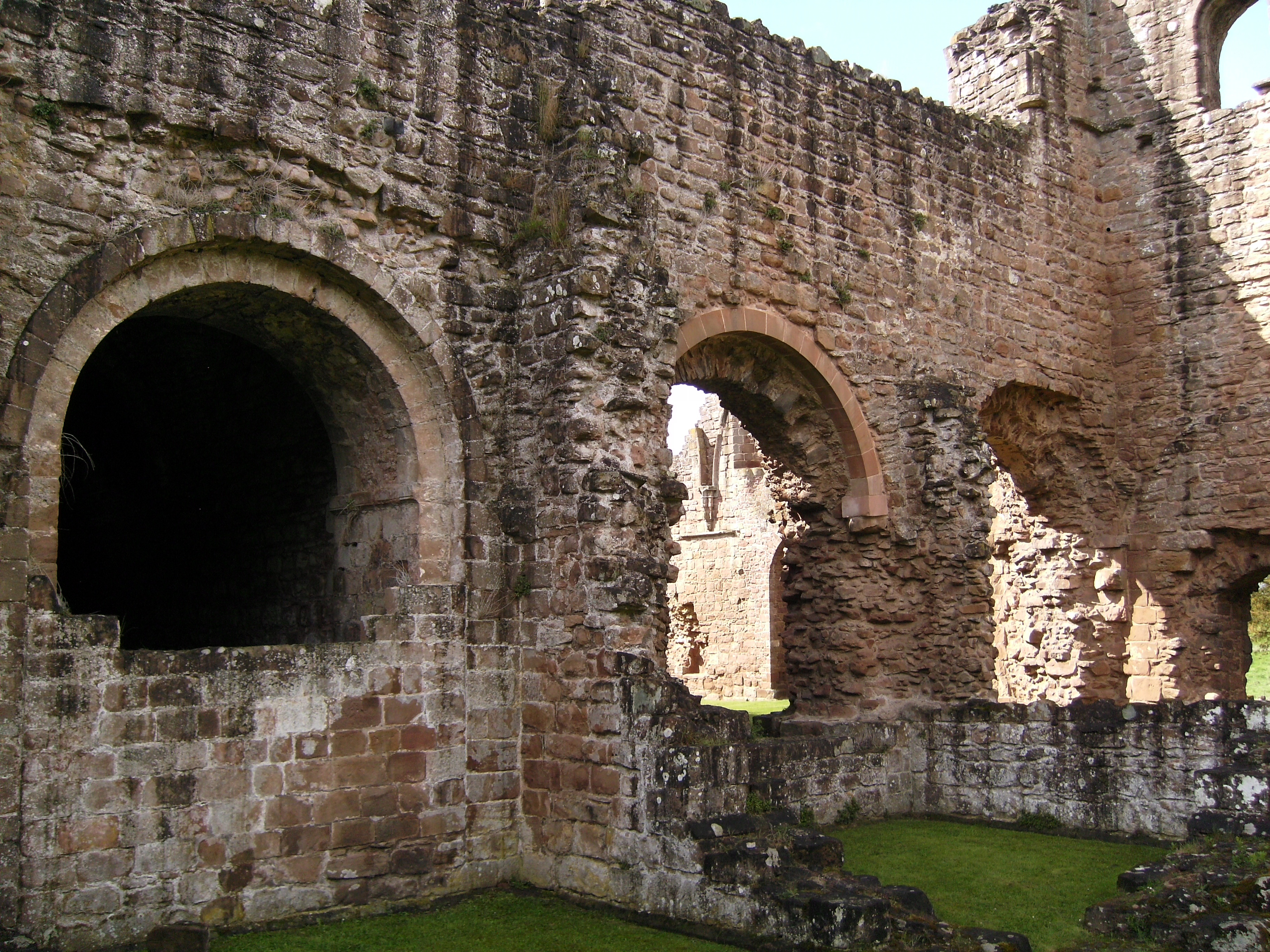
North east of the abbey church, showing interior of the chancel.

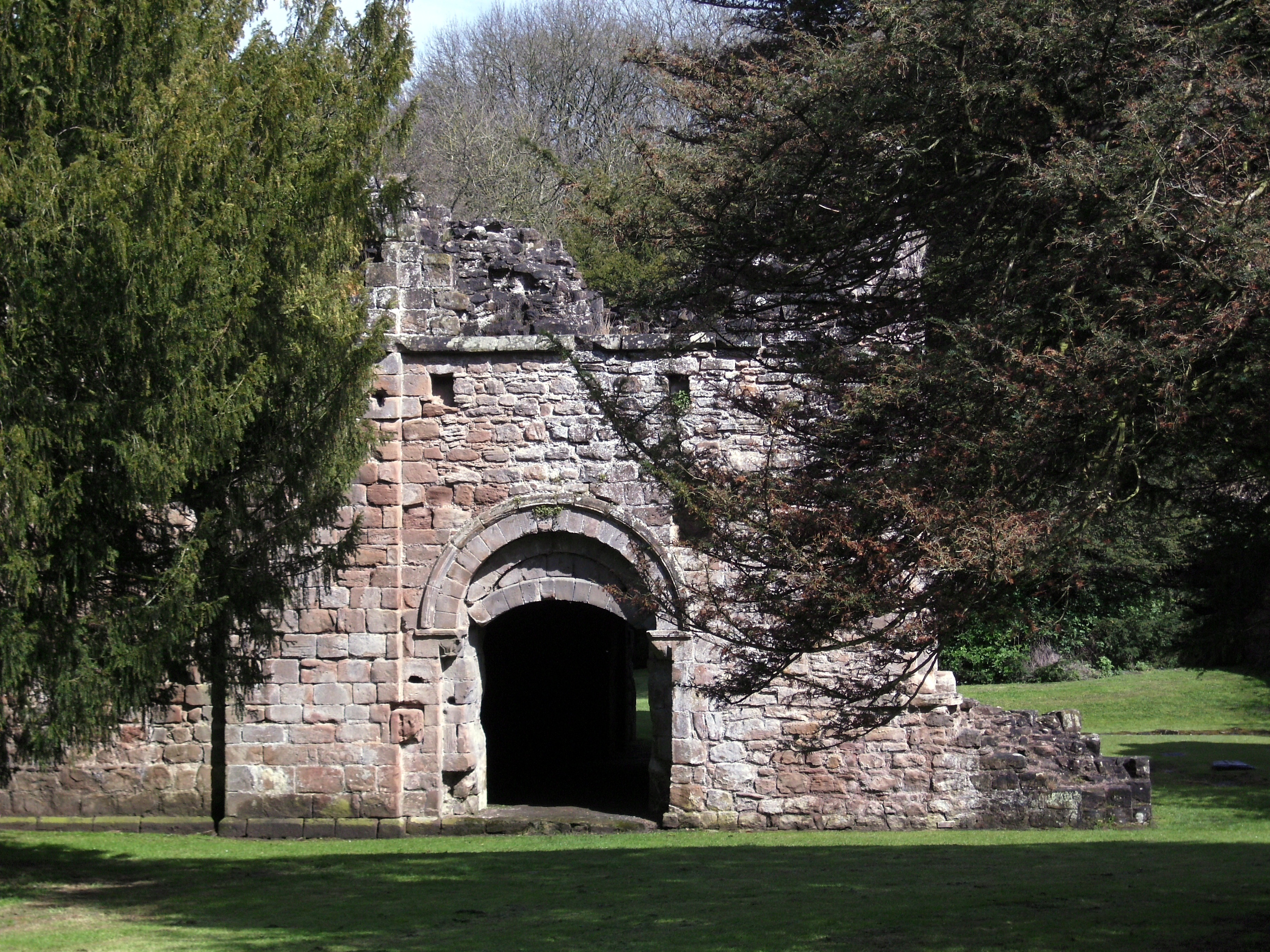
Domestic buildings, called west range on site, but actually the western end of the south range. It probably included the abbot's lodging on its first floor.

== See also ==
- Grade I listed buildings in Shropshire
- Listed buildings in Lilleshall and Donnington
