= Thorunn Ormsdottir =

15th-century Icelandic prioress

- Þórunn Ormsdóttir
- Died: 1432
- Occupation: Prioress
- Years active: 1408–1432
- Employer: Reynistaðarklaustur
- Predecessor: Ingibjörg Örnólfsdóttir
- Successor: Þóra Finnsdóttir

Thorunn Ormsdottir (Þórunn Ormsdóttir; died 1431) was a prioress and directed of the Benedictine convent Reynistaðarklaustur in Iceland, along with Þuríður Halldórsdóttir. Thorunn ran the convent from 1402 until she died in 1431, although she was never promoted to abbess; there was not an abbess from when Ingibjörg Örnólfsdóttir died during the black plague until 1437.

The steward Björgólfur Illugason was the first to manage the convent after the plague and, in 1408, Thorunn and Þuríður took over. The convent grew wealthy during their oversight, not the least because of steward Björgólfur's family; his daughter Steinunn and relative Sigríður Sæmundsdóttir joined the convent in 1413 and they were given 50 hundreds. In 1427, Björgólfur's son Illugi gave money to the convent in exchange for care in his old age (called próventa) and brought his estate with him. His daughter Þóra became a nun in the convent.

On February 4, 1431, Bishop Jón Vilhjálmsson Craxton inducted eight nuns to the convent: Sigríður Sæmundsdóttir, Steinunn Björgólfsdóttir, Þóra Illugadóttir, Þóra Finnsdóttir, Helga Bjarnadóttir, Arndís Einarsdóttir, Agnes Jónsdóttir, and Þórdís Finnsdóttir. They pledged themselves to chastity, obedience to their superiors, and poverty. However, not all of nuns kept the first part of their vow and, a short while later, Þóra Illugadóttir gave birth to a child fathered by Reverend Þórður Hróbjartsson, a priest in Hólar in Hjaltadalur. It came to light that she had become pregnant before becoming a nun. Moreover, during the next year, Þuríður Halldórsdóttir, who had not been in the convent for long, also gave birth to a child. The child's father was Þorlákur Sigurðsson, a butler in Hólar. Bishop Jón was lenient on these violations and Þórður Hróbjartsson was sentenced to make a pilgrimage to Rome. He and Þóra had another child together later on.

This was a big scandal and it was difficult for prioress Thorunn who seems to have died shortly after. Þóra Finnsdóttir, one of the newly inducted sisters, became the prioress afterwards.
