= Oddbjörg Jónsdóttir =

14th-century Icelandic abbess

- Died: 1389
- Title: Abbess of Reynistaðir Abbey
- Term: 1369–1389
- Predecessor: Guðný Helgadóttir
- Successor: Ingibjörg Örnólfsdóttir

Oddbjörg Jónsdóttir (died 1389) was an abbess in Reynistaðir Abbey, inducted into the position in 1369 by Jón skalli ("the bald") Eiríksson, bishop of Hólar, after Guðný Helgadóttir died. Oddbjörg had previously been a nun in the Kirkjubær Abbey.

Oddbjörg did not look after the convent's finances; the abbey managers this time 1380 were Brynjófur Bjarnason the rich of Akrar and Reverend Þorleifur Bergþórsson. In 1386, the priest Jón Þórðarson, one of the authors of the Flateyjarbók, managed the convent. During this period, the abbey became considerably wealthy, both from próventa (money given to the convent in exchange for care in old age) from well-off people as well as wealthy women becoming nuns. One of these was Ingibjörg Örnólfsdóttir who became the abbess after Oddbjörg died.
