= Cuno of Praeneste =

German Cardinal and papal legate

Cuno (Note: His name is variously spelled Kuno, Cunon, Conon, Conone, and Conrad in different sources.) of Praeneste (Note: Praeneste is the modern Palestrina.) (died 9 August 1122) was a German Cardinal and papal legate, an influential diplomatic figure of the early 12th century, active in France and Germany. He held numerous synods throughout Europe, and excommunicated the Emperor Henry V numerous times, in the struggle over the issue of lay investiture of ecclesiastical offices. He spent six years promoting the acceptance of Thurstan of York as archbishop by King Henry I of England, without making York subject to Canterbury. He was seriously considered for election to the papacy in 1119, which he refused.

== Early life ==
According to Salvador Miranda, he was created cardinal-priest in 1073. This is not in accord with other facts of Cuno's career.

He was a Canon Regular, and, around 1090, along with Heldemar of Tournai and a layman named Roger, was one of the founders of the abbey of Arrouaise. In a letter of 21 October 1097, Bishop Lambert of Arras granted the priest Cuno and his associate Heldemar the privilege of having to answer only to the bishop. The little oratory belonging to the members was replaced by a stone church, which was consecrated by Bishop Godfrid of Amiens and Bishop Joannes of Therouanne on 23 September 1106.

Cuno apparently met Pope Paschal II for the first time at the Council of Troyes in May 1107.

== Cardinal ==
He was bishop of Palestrina, and thus a cardinal, c. 1108.

According to the Chronicon of Peter the Deacon of Montecassino, in 1111, at a Council in Jerusalem, Cuno pronounced the Emperor Henry V excommunicated and stripped of his power. From the previous year, Cuno had been trying to influence papal policy with regard to the emperor, and this hostile move was without the Pope's agreement. In the sixth session of the Lateran synod, on 23 March 1112, Cardinal Cuno actually demanded that the pope stand by his legate, and ratify the legate's acts. In embarrassment, the Pope Paschal did so.

Cuno was at his old monastery of Aroasia (Arrouaise) on 7 May 1112, when he officially presented the institution a collection of relics which he had brought from Rome, including Saints Sebastian, Hippolytus, the Four Crowned Martyrs, Felicissimus, Caecilia, the tomb of Jesus, and the manger of Bethlehem.

Cardinal Cuno had returned to Italy by the end of the year 1112. He traveled south with Pope Paschal II, and was with the pope at Benevento for his synod in the second week of February 1113. He subscribed bulls for the pope at Benevento on 13 and 15 February.

== Legate in France and Germany ==
In 1114 and 1115 he was back in France as papal legate. Pope Paschal had sworn to the emperor that he would not excommunicate him; but a papal legate had such powers and had not sworn an oath not to use them. Cuno summoned a synod on 6 December 1114 at Beauvais; another at Soissons on 6 January 1115, where he also held talks with King Louis VI of France; and another at Reims on 28 March 1115. At each of these meetings, he again excommunicated Henry V. On 19 April 1115, the Legate held a council at Cologne, where he once again excommunicated the emperor. From 6—12 July 1115, Cuno presided over a synod held at Chalons-sur-Marne. He also suspended all the bishops and abbots of Normandy, for ignoring his invitation to attend the council at Chalons. In fact, they had been forbidden to do so by King Henry I of England. Ivo of Chartres attempted to calm the legate by pointing out that the Norman prelates were subject to a foreign prince. The king appealed to Rome, in defense of the tradition that no papal legate except the archbishop of Canterbury might hold power in the king's realms.

=== The Thurstan Affair ===
Cardinal Cuno first became acquainted with the Thurstan case in 1114, shortly after his election to the see of York. Thurston was a royal chaplain and a subdeacon, but was ordained a deacon by Bishop William of Winchester. He was unwilling to be ordained a priest by the new archbishop of Canterbury, Ralph d'Escures, or by one of his suffragans, since the taking of oaths of obedience was involved, and Thurston did not want to create a situation in which Canterbury could claim jurisdiction or authority over him or York. He therefore went to Normandy just before Christmas, and laid his problem before King Henry I, announcing his intention to go to Rome to seek satisfaction. The king consulted the Legate Cuno, who advised that Thurstan should be ordained a priest by any bishop who happened to be at the royal court, and then sent to him; he would send Thurstan on to the papal court, provided with appropriate letters. But Thurstan had returned to York, and nothing was settled by the end of June 1115. The king, therefore, summoned a council of the kingdom's leaders to meet in London at Michaelmas (29 September), at which the king ordered Thurstan to seek consecration from the archbishop of Canterbury. Thurstan appealed to the pope, but the king refused to allow him to go or to send representatives. When Pope Paschal replied to the formal notice of Thurstan's election by the Chapter of York, he replied, ordering that Thurstan be consecrated by the archbishop of Canterbury, but without any of the controversial oaths. The king, however, insisted on the oaths and threatened to depose Thurstan. Ralph of Canterbury stayed out of his own province in order to avoid carrying out the pope's commands, and was still in Normandy when Pope Paschal died in February 1118. Owing to obstruction by the king and Archbishop Ralph, Thurstan was unable to reach Pope Gelasius during his brief reign, though the pope had ordered both archbishops to present themselves before him.

The new pope, Calixtus II, summoned the archbishops of England to the council which he intended to hold in Reims in October 1119, and, despite attempted obstruction on the part of Henry I, Thurstan appeared, and was consecrated a bishop on 20 October 1119 by Calixtus himself. For the next six months, as far as the papal visit to Gap, Thurstan was in constant attendance at the papal court.

Subsequently, Cuno worked with Thurstan, Archbishop of York to broker peace between Henry I and Louis VI of France.

=== Pope Gelasius ===
On 13 April 1118, Holy Saturday, Pope Gelasius wrote a letter from Capua to Cardinal Cuno. First, he related everything that had happened since his election in January. He then informed his legate that he and the cardinals had excommunicated the Emperor Henry and his antipope Gregory VIII (Maurice Burdinus) on Palm Sunday, and that Cuno was to inform all the bishops in his legation of the fact; Cuno was to gird himself to revenge the wrongs done to Holy Mother the Church. On 20—22 May 1118, Cardinal Cuno held a synod at Cologne, where the Emperor Henry V was excommunicated. These excommunications were repeated wherever Cuno held a synod or council.

He then moved to Germany, stirring up opposition to the Emperor. Cuno presided as papal legate at the concilium Fridislariense (Hesse), on 28 July 1118, in which the excommunication of the emperor was confirmed, and St Norbert was accused of various irregularities, including preaching while not yet a priest, and wearing a religious habit while not a monk.

== Offered the papacy ==
In March 1118, the newly elected Pope Gelasius II was driven out of Rome by the forces of the emperor Henry V. After staying at his native Gaeta, then Capua, then Pisa, he crossed to France in October. In December, he settled a dispute between Abbot Pontius of Cluny and Bishop Guy of Lescar. On 1 January 1119, he held a synod in Vienne, and then travelled by way of Lyon to Mâcon, where he held another synod. During the synod he became seriously ill, suffering from pleurisy according to Pandolfus Pisanus, and asked to be taken to his next stop, the abbey of Cluny.

When he perceived the seriousness of his condition, he summoned Cardinal Cuno von Urach, and, according to Falco of Benevento, offered him the papacy. Kuno immediately and emphatically turned the pope down. Gelasius died on 29 January 1119, and, in accordance with the papal bull In Nomine Domini of Pope Nicholas II, the right to nominate the candidate to be his successor belonged to the cardinal-bishops. Two cardinal-bishops were present, Cuno of Palestrina (who had precedence) and Lamberto of Ostia, and they chose Archbishop Guy of Vienne, the brother of the duke of Burgundy and uncle of the King of Castile and León. The other cardinals, as well as the Roman clergy and laity who were present at Cluny ratified the choice, and Archbishop Guy became Pope Calixtus II.

Cardinal Cuno followed the pope-elect to Lyon and then Vienne, and, when the ratification of the election by the cardinals and clergy at Rome was received, he participated in the enthronement of Calixtus II in the cathedral of Vienne on 9 February 1119. He wrote a letter to the bishop of Nevers describing the events.

== Legate in France again ==
Immediately after the enthronement, Cardinal Cuno, still papal legate, hastened to Vézelay, on reports of terrible atrocities. Clients of Guillaume II, Count of Nevers, had broken into the monastery, destroyed the relics of four saints, desecrated a gold cross containing some of the wood of the cross of Jesus, and beaten and raped some of the monks. The count appeared to have denied all knowledge or connection with the incident, and Cuno ordered the bishop of Nevers to have the count come to the legate and defend himself against the abbot of Vézelay, Renaud de Semur, and other accusers. Nineteen others who were named by the legate as participants in the sacrilege were ordered to appear and face judgment or be excommunicated. Cuno was not able to settle the case, since the abbot made an appeal to the French king in April.

In July 1119, Cuno was with Pope Calixtus in Toulouse, where the pope held a church synod. The council legislated against simony, against the granting of church offices to persons who had not been ordained to the diaconate; it anathematized persons who denied four of the seven sacraments; it legislated against the seizing of the income of bishops and clerics by princes and lay persons, and against making ecclesiastical offices or benefices hereditary. Cuno subscribed one of Calixtus' bulls on 14 July and another on 15 July.

Pope Calixtus travelled by way of Paris and Soissons to Reims. His long-advertised synod began on 20 October 1119, with fifteen archbishops and more than 200 bishops in attendance, as well as King Louis VI of France. Calixtus and the emperor Henry had been making plans to meet, but ultimately distrust and suspicions on both sides brought the project to nothing. On the sixth day of the synod, 30 October, the emperor and his antipope were again excommunicated. Cardinal Cuno was in attendance. After the council, while Calixtus was still in Reims, he was approached by Archbishop Thurstan, Cardinal Cuno, and the other cardinals, who entreated the pope to hold a meeting with the king of England, and, if possible, make peace between England and France. The meeting took place, near Gisors, on 22 November 1119. but the discussion was mostly about Thurstan. Henry demanded the oaths of fealty, which Calixtus and Thurstan refused, and therefore the meeting ended without result. Cuno and the other cardinals had been present at Gisors, but were not at the meeting, about which they complained loudly. Henry returned to England, and seized all of the archbishop's property.

In the first week of December 1119, at Sens, Pope Calixtus again named Cardinal Cuno his legate in France, with England and Normandy added.

In February 1120, Ralph of Canterbury persuaded King Henry to send Bishop Warlewast of Exeter to the pope, to see if something could be salvaged for the see of Canterbury. On his way, the bishop happened to meet Cardinal Cuno, the Legate in France, who sent a report immediately to the pope about what he had learned of the mission. Henry proposed that Thurstan make his profession to Canterbury, and then he could be sent as legate to England. Bishop Warlewast, who reached the papal court when it was at Valence, made a bad impression, if only because of his clumsy attempt to pass out bribes, and failed completely.

On 11 March 1120, the cardinal was with Pope Calixtus II at Gap in the Alps of France. On that day, the pope publicly conferred the pallium on Archbishop Thurstan of York, and declared that York was in no way subject to Canterbury. He also sent King Henry a letter about taking back Archbishop Thurstan.

Cardinal Cuno presided at the synod of Beauvais on 18 October 1120. The principal matter was the request of Bishop Lisiard of Soissons for the disinterment of the remains of Bishop Arnulf of Soissons (died 1087), and his consideration for canonization. Despite objections by the bishop of Tournai, the legate and the council agreed to the transfer. Another synod was held at Soissons in March 1121, at which Abelard was accused of the Sabellian heresy, and forced to recant and burn his book, the Theologia Summi Boni.

Cuno was back at the Lateran Palace in Rome on 17 April 1121.

== Death ==
Cuno (Kono) died at Palestrina on 9 August 1122, less than three months before Pope Calixtus and Henry V signed the Concordat of Worms.
