= Þóra Finnsdóttir =

Prioress (1408 – c.1460)

Barbara
- Þóra
- Died: 1461
- Title: Abbess of Reynistaðarklaustur
- Predecessor: Þórunn Ormsdóttir
- Successor: Agnes Jónsdóttir
- Parent(s): Finnur Gamlason and Valgerður Vilhjálmsdóttir

Þóra Finnsdóttir (1408–1461) was a prioress of the Benedictine convent named Reynistathir Abbey (Reynistaðarklaustur) in Iceland, serving since the death of the previous prioress, Þórunn Ormsdóttir. She became the abbess on August 25, 1437, when she was ordained by bishop of Skálholt Gozewijn Comhaer. An exemption had to be made for Þóra because she was only 29 years old when her predecessor died, and abbesses had to be at least 30 years old to be ordained.

== Biography ==
Þóra came from a wealthy family. Her parents were Finnur Gamlason, a lawyer in Ysta-Mói in Fljót, and his wife Valgerður Vilhjálmsdóttir. Her uncles were Jón Gamlason, abbot of Þingeyrar, and Marteinn Gamlason, county magistrate in Ketilsstaðir of Vellir.

Þóra was one of the eight nuns who Jón Vilhjálmsson Craxton ordained at Hólar on February 4, 1431. Around the same time that she became prioress, the convent received a windfall. Margrét Bjarnadóttir, widow of the lawyer Hrafn Guðmundsson, joined the convent and brought a substantial amount of wealth. In addition, she gave land to the church of Hólar to lay to rest her husband, who was excommunicated when he died.

Upon taking the role of abbess in 1437, following a local bout of plague, Þóra took the name Barbara after Saint Barbara, one of the Fourteen Holy Helpers. Barbara presided over a long period of prosperity for the abbey. She died in 1461 and Agnes Jónsdóttir was appointed following Barbara's death.

== Sources ==
- "Reynistaðarklaustur". Tímarit Hins íslenska bókmenntafélags, 8. árg. 1887.
- "Reynistaðarklaustur". Sunnudagsblað Tímans, 6. ágúst 1967“.
- Sigríður Gunnarsdóttir: Nunnuklaustrið að Reynistað. Smárit Byggðasafns Skagfirðinga.
