= Guðný Helgadóttir =

14th-century Icelandic abbess

- Died: c. 1368
- Title: Abbess of Reynistaður Abbey
- Term: 1332–1368
- Predecessor: Hallbera Þorsteinsdóttir
- Successor: Oddbjörg Jónsdóttir

Guðný Helgadóttir (died c. 1368) was an abbess of Iceland's Reynistaður Abbey during the 14th century, succeeding Hallbera Þorsteinsdóttir, who died in 1330. Quite a few things are unclear about the abbesses of Reynistaður during this time, and the names Kristín and Katrín are specified for the abbesses. It is probable that these names refer to the same person, and Guðný took a saint's name—likely Kristín—when Bishop Egill Eyjólfsson inducted her in 1332. Otherwise, little is known about Guðný.

During her tenure, a dispute began about certain easements in Skagi, in the area referred to as Ólafarparta, which Benedikt Kolbeinsson of Auðkúla, nephew of the abbess Hallbera, had given the abbey when his daughter Ingibjörg joined. Bishop Egill Eyjólfsson had made the contract for the abbey and Björn Þorsteinsson, abbot of Þingeyra, witnessed it. However, this situation turned into a law suit and the land rights ultimately went to Hólastóll.

It is not entirely known what year Guðný died; sources mention 1367, 1368, and 1369.
