= Council of Soissons =

The Council or Synod of Soissons (Latin: Concilium Suessionense) may refer to any of the following Catholic synods in Soissons, France:

== 3 March 744 ==
Held by order of King Pepin, this council was attended by 23 bishops including Hartbert, bishop of Sens, and presided over by St Boniface. The mayor Carloman was also involved. It condemned the charismatic mystic preacher Aldebert and ordered his arrest, appointed St Abel bishop of Reims, and published 10 canons: recognizing the Nicene Creed (1); forbidding fornication and perjury to laity and ordering all priests to submit to their bishop, to receive him as needed, to obtain the holy rite and chrism from him, and to render an annual account of their conduct (4); forbidding the reception of foreign clerics (5); directing bishops to extirpate paganism (6); ordering Adelbert's crosses removed and burned (7); forbidding clerics from housing women other than their mothers, sisters, and nieces (8); forbidding laity from housing nuns or from marrying another man's wife before his death.

== 13 November 833 ==
Held in the Church of St Mary, this council was presided over by Ebbo, archbishop of Reims. It deposed King Louis the Pious and forced him to confess to various crimes.

== 26 April 853 ==
Held in St Medard Abbey, this council was attended by 26 or 52 bishops and King Charles the Bald and presided over by Hincmar, archbishop of Reims. It produced 30 canons declaring the acts of Ebbo during his second episcopate invalid, particularly his clerical appointments and alienation of church property.

== 18 August 866 ==
Ordered by King Charles the Bald, this council was attended by 35 bishops including Wenilo, archbishop of Rouen. It reinstated the clerics appointed by Ebbo.

== c. 1092 ==
Held in either 1092 or 1093, this council was presided over by Renaud du Bellay, archbishop of Reims. It condemned Roscelin, teacher of Peter Abelard, for tritheism. Its acts do not survive.

== 6 January 1115 ==
This council was presided over by Cuno, bishop of Palestrina. This council ordered deputies to be sent to the Carthusians, ordering them to return St Godfrey back to his see of Amiens.

== February 1121 ==
This council was presided over by Cuno. It condemned the teaching of Peter Abelard as Sabellianism without offering him a chance to speak in his defense and compelled him to burn a copy of his Theologia Summi Boni ("Theology of the Greatest Good"). Abelard subsequently argued in his Historia Calamitatum ("A History of My Misfortunes") that he had been attempting to uphold orthodoxy against both Sabellianism and Roscelin's tritheism.

== 11 July 1456 ==
This council was presided over by Jean Juvénal des Ursins, archbishop of Reims. It enacted a number of canons ordering the Decrees of Basel to be carried out; confirming the terms of the Pragmatic Sanction of Bourges; and enacting various rules about the dress of bishops, the approval of confessors, and the selling of indulgences.
