= Hallbera Þorsteinsdóttir =

14-century Icelandic abbess

- Died: 1330
- Title: Abbess of Reynistaður Abbey
- Term: 1299–1330
- Successor: Guðný Helgadóttir
- Parent(s): Þorsteinn Halldórsson, Ingigerður Filippusdóttir
- Relatives: Guðrún Þorsteinsdóttir (sister)

Hallbera Þorsteinsdóttir (died 1330; Old Norse: [ˈhɑlːˌberɑ ˈθorˌstɛinsˌdoːtːez̠]; Modern Icelandic: [ˈhatl̥ˌpɛːra ˈθɔrˌsteinsˌtouhtɪr̥]) was the founder and abbess of the convent Reynistaðarklaustur of the Benedictine order on Iceland.

Hallbera belonged to a wealthy and powerful Icelandic family. She was the daughter of Abbot Þorsteinn Halldórsson of Hestur and later Stórólfshvoll and Ingigerður Filippusdóttir of the Oddaverjar. Her sister, Guðrún Þorsteinsdóttir, was married to the chieftain Kolbeinn Bjarnason, but Hallbera's marital status prior to joining the abbey is not mentioned in contemporary sources. She could have lived as a financially independent widow before turning to a religious life, as was not uncommon for aristocratic women in Iceland at the time. In 1295, Hallbera donated vast lands to the foundation of a convent for nuns of the order of Saint Benedict. This was to be one of only two convents open to females in medieval Iceland, both of which were closed during the Reformation.

Hallbera is known to have served as abbess of Reynistaðarklaustur from at least 1299 (until her death), but scholars Ármann Jakobsson and Ásdís Egilsdóttir also identify her as the "Sister Katrín" who was Reynistaðarklaustur's first abbess, arguing that Katrín was Hallbera's religious name. Sister Katrín otherwise served as abbess for only one year before vanishing from all sources. If Hallbera and Sister Kristín are the same person, then she lived at Munkaþverá as a nun or anchorite prior to the founding of Reynistaðarklaustur and was an educated and literate woman for whom the religious name Katrín (Catherine) would have been highly appropriate.

Hallbera had a close professional relationship to the Bishops of Holar, Auðunn rauði Þorbergsson and Lárentíus Kálfsson, who respected her opinion. The latter dedicated several poems to her.

== Sources ==
- „„Reynistaðarklaustur“. Tímarit Hins íslenska bókmenntafélags, 8. árg. 1887.“,
- „„Reynistaðarklaustur“. Sunnudagsblað Tímans, 6. ágúst 1967.“,
- Sigríður Gunnarsdóttir: Nunnuklaustrið að Reynistað. Smárit Byggðasafns Skagfirðinga.
- Ármann Jakobsson and Ásdís Egilsdóttir, “Abbadísin sem hvarf,” in Þúsund og eitt orð sagt Sigurgeiri Steingrímssyni fimmtugum 2. október 1993 (Reykjavík: Menningar- og minningarsjóður Mette Magnussen, 1993), 7–9.
