= Solveig Rafnsdóttir =

16th-century Icelandic abbess

- Born: c. 1470
- Died: 1561, 1562, or 1563 (sources differ)
- Title: Abbess of Reynistaðarklaustur
- Term: 1507–1562
- Predecessor: Agnes Jónsdóttir
- Parent(s): Rafn Brandsson the elder, Margrét Eyjólfsdóttir
- Relatives: Brandur Rafnsson (brother)

Solveig Rafnsdóttir (c. 1470–1562) was the last abbess of Iceland's Reynistaður Abbey. She became a nun in 1493 and was inducted as abbess on the eighth day of Christmas (January 1) in 1508 and served there until Iceland's practice of Catholic monasticism was ended in 1551.

== Family ==
Solveig came from a highly aristocratic family. He father was the sheriff Rafn Brandsson the elder (c. 1420–1483) and her mother was Margrét Eyjólfsdóttir, the daughter of Eyjólfur Arnfinnson, a knight in Urðir. Solveig's brother was Brandur Rafnsson, a priest in Hof in Vopnafjörður who later became a prior in Skriðuklaustur Abbey. Solveig's father Rafn was known for a dispute with Bishop Ólafur Rögnvaldsson and had been excommunicated sometime before his death. This may have been a factor in Solveig joining the abbey.

== Tenure as abbess ==
Solveig took over the abbey's administration after the death of abbess Agnes Jónsdóttir in 1507. She led with vigor, was involved in various lawsuits, and ably defended her rights as well as the abbey's. In a record of the abbey's assets from 1525, it is mentioned that it had 42 inhabited estates, 7 uninhabited ones, 114 oxen, 520 sheep, and 33 horses.

When monastic life ended during the Reformation, the nuns were not kicked out, but continued to live as they were accustomed to in Reynistaður into their old age. The nuns became responsible for taking care of the abbey and its inhabitants. Solveig continued to manage the abbey, but she had no authority over its assets. She maintained position until her death; sources differ as to whether she died in 1561, 1562, or 1563.

== Historical artifact ==
In the National Museum of Iceland there is a rare altar cloth from Skarð in Skarðströnd, although it is now very worn. It is embroidered all over with religious icons including: Bishop Þorlákur the holy, Saint Benedikt the abbot, Saint Egidíus, Ólafur the holy, Magnús Eyjajarl, and Saint Hallvarður. The names of the saints are stitched under each image, and at the top of the cloth is a string of letters reading: "abbadis Solve[ig: rafns]dotter i reynenese" (Abbess Solve[ig rafns]dotter in Reynistaður). It is certain that this is Solveig Rafnsdóttir.

== See also ==
- Halldóra Sigvaldadóttir
