= Missenden Abbey =

Monastery in Buckinghamshire, England

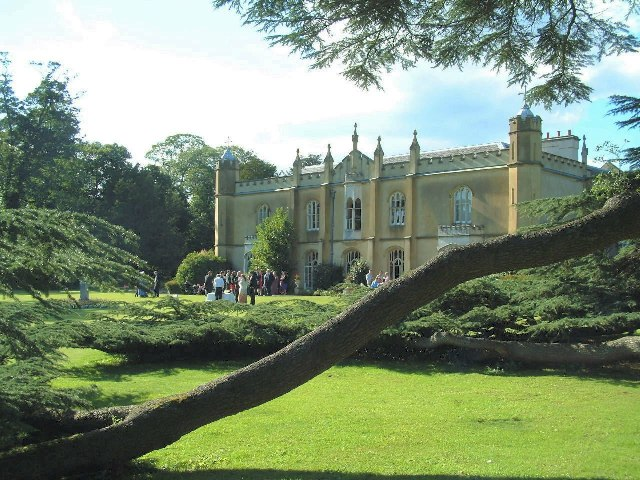
- "Missenden Abbey" - country house dating from 1574

- Location within Buckinghamshire

Monastery information
- Order: Arrouasian (Augustinian)
- Established: 1133
- Disestablished: 1538
- Mother house: Arrouaise Abbey
- Diocese: Diocese of Lincoln

People
- Founder: William de Missenden

Site
- Location: Great Missenden, Buckinghamshire
- Coordinates: 51.700759°N 0.702853°W
- Grid reference: SP8901

Missenden Abbey is a former Arrouasian (Augustinian) monastery, founded in 1133 in Great Missenden, Buckinghamshire, United Kingdom. The abbey was dissolved in 1538, and the abbey church demolished. In 1574 a house, also known as Missenden Abbey, was constructed on the site of the monastic cloisters, incorporating some of the monastic remains. The house was altered several times, gaining its current "Regency Gothic" style at the beginning of the 19th century. The house was "gutted" by fire in 1985 and subsequently rebuilt.

== Abbey ==
=== Foundation ===
The abbey of Missenden was founded c.1133, by William de Missenden, the lord of Missenden manor. Two of the abbey's foundation charters (those issued by King Henry I, and by Alexander, Bishop of Lincoln) state there were originally seven canons, who came to Missenden from "the church of St. Mary 'de Bosco (or de Nemore) de pago Terresino". This church - thought to have been in Ruisseauville, France - was a daughter house of Arrouaise Abbey, also in France. Missenden thus became the home of the first abbey in Buckinghamshire and the second Arrouasian community in England, after Warter Abbey in East Yorkshire.

"The Arrouasian canons differed very little from other Augustinians, and sometimes abandoned at an early date the slight distinctions they originally had". The Arrouasian Order "never seem to have been really an independent order with special privileges", and thus often were not distinguished from canons of the Augustinian Order.

=== 15th and 16th Centuries ===
During a visit conducted between 1431 and 1436, William Grey, Bishop of Lincoln, found that the abbey did not have enough canons to perform its religious duties, and that some of the abbey's buildings were in need of repair.

A visit in 1518 by William Atwater, Bishop of Lincoln, found the discipline at the abbey was "lax", and that the refectory needed to be repaired. In 1521, a canon at the abbey was forced to do penance for heresy.

In 1530 and 1531 the abbey was visited by John Longland, Bishop of Lincoln, who found the abbey in debt, while all of the buildings were in need of repair. The bishop found the abbot, John Fox, to be " wholly under the influence of a secular, John Compton, who cut down trees and did as he pleased with the goods of the monastery." Bishop Longland suspended Abbot Fox, placing the abbey under the control of John Otwell, who would later become abbot himself.

=== Dissolution ===
The abbey was surrendered for dissolution in 1538, and the abbey church was demolished the same year. The last abbot, John Otwell, subsequently married before dying in 1552.

=== Architectural history and remains ===
There is no extant plan of the medieval monastery, but a partial reconstruction is possible based on documentary evidence, excavation work and comparisons with other religious houses of the period. The Abbey Church, which was dedicated to the Blessed Virgin Mary, was located on the North side of the cloister, running from west to east, as was typical of the period. Excavated stonework suggests that the church was highly decorated, in a romanesque style. The church housed the largest bell in Buckinghamshire, which weighed more than 2.5 tons.

The abbey church, of which nothing remains, was located 300 yards east of the present building. This building incorporates stonework from the east range of the cloister buildings, but none of it is visible. Excavations conducted in 1983 showed that the abbey church was built in two or three phases; the earliest of which dated from the mid-12th century.

=== Abbots of Missenden ===
A list of the known abbots of Missenden:

- Daniel. First abbot; name occurs 1133 and 1145
- Peter, name occurs c.1163
- Adam, name occurs 1198 and 1206
- William, name occurs 1217
- Martin, deposed 1236
- Robert, elected 1236, resigned 1240
- Roger of Gilsburgh, elected 1240
- Simon of London, elected 1258, resigned 1262
- Geoffrey de Welpesle, elected 1262, resigned 1268
- William of London, elected 1268
- Matthew of Tring, died 1306
- Richard Marshall, elected 1306, died 1323
- Robert of Kimble, elected 1323, resigned 1339
- William Delamere, elected 1339, died 1340
- Henry of Buckingham, elected 1340
- John of Abingdon, elected 1347, died 1348
- William of Bradley, elected 1348, resigned 1356
- Ralf Marshall, elected 1356, died 1374
- William of Thenford, elected 1374, died 1384
- John Marsh, elected 1384, died 1398
- Richard Meer, elected 1398
- Robert Risborough, deposed 1462
- Henry Honor of Missenden, elected 1462
- William Smith, (fn. 94) died 1521
- William Honor, elected 1521, died 1528
- John Fox, elected 1528, occurs 1535
- John Otwell, last abbot; abbey dissolved 1538

== Burials at the Abbey ==
- John FitzAlan, 2nd Baron Arundel
- William Bois
- Elizabeth Cellier, Catholic midwife
- Joan Howard de Braose
- John du Plessis, 7th Earl of Warwick
- Lady Isabella Brocas Golafre
- Katherine Missenden Iwardby
- Sir Edmund Missenden
- Sir Thomas Missenden
- Elizabeth Hampden Salendine
- Lady Juliana Grey Shelley

== Country House ==
=== Construction ===
Like many other former monasteries, a country house was constructed on the site of the former abbey. Also known as "Missenden Abbey", the house was constructed in 1574, on the site of the former cloisters, and incorporating some of the monastic remains. The house was altered and remodeled in both the 17th and 18th centuries. Between 1806 and 1814, the house was remodeled in a "Regency Gothic" style, for John Ayton. The two storied house was built around a courtyard and featured "castellated parapets, corner turrets with arrow slits and conical caps."

=== Fire and later history ===
The building was designated Grade II listed on 10 March 1983. However, in 1985 the building was destroyed by fire. The house was "gutted". Among that destroyed was the "15th or 16th century roof of the East range", which was "a rare survival of a monastic roof". The building was reconstructed following the fire, with some of the interiors remodeled.

The abbey has been owned by Buckinghamshire New University since the mid-1990s. It is now used as a conference centre and also used for weddings.

In April 2016, the abbey's first same-sex marriage was performed.
