= Agnes Jónsdóttir =

15th-century Icelandic abbess

Agnes
- Died: 1507
- Title: Abbess of Reynistaðarklaustur
- Term: 1461–1507
- Predecessor: Þóra Finnsdóttir
- Successor: Solveig Rafnsdóttir
- Parent: Jóns Jónssonar búlands

Agnes Jónsdóttir (died 1507) was a prioress and later the abbess of Reynistaður Abbey in Iceland from 1461 until her death in 1507. She succeeded Þóra Finnsdóttir (also known as Barbara) who was ordained as a nun with her in 1431.

Agnes Jónsdóttir was the daughter of Búland county magistrate Jón Jónsson within the municipality of Húnaþing. Her brothers were Ásgrimur Jónsson, the abbot of Þingeyrar cloister, and Þorvaldur at Móberg who was the father of Björg, the second wife of the lawyer Jón Sigmundsson. Agnes became the prioress upon Þóra's death but it is not clear when exactly she became inaugurated as abbess. She allegedly did not want to bend herself to the will of the bishop of Hólar, Ólafur Rögnvaldsson, and she tried to hire Þorleifur Árnason of Glaumbær against Ólafur's wishes. However, these plans did not materialize and she was reprimanded by the bishop. The convent's overseer later became Jón Þorvaldsson, Agnes' nephew, who eventually served as the abbot at Þingeyrar.

At the turn of the 16th century, the nuns comprised, in addition to Abbess Agnes, Guðbjörg Pálsdóttir, Helga Þorkelsdóttir, Steinvör Guðólfsdóttir, Þorgerður Jónsdóttir, Þórdís (Agnes's niece), and Solveig Rafnsdóttir.

Agnes died at an advanced age in 1507 and Solveig Rafnsdóttir succeeded her as the last abbess of Reynistaður Abbey.
