= Próventa =

Medieval nordic elder care practice

Próventa was a practice in Iceland (and other Nordic countries) during the Middle Ages in which elderly people would sign their assets over to an abbey or monastery for care during their old age until the end of their lives. In addition to serving a social function, this was an important source of income for religious institutions. The term próventa refers both to the act of providing care and the funds or assets provided in exchange for said care. The people who received care in exchange for paying their próventa were called próventumaður ("próventa-man") or próventukona ("próventa-woman"). In English, the recipients of this sort of care are called corrodians.

== Etymology ==
The term próventa came to Icelandic from the Latin prōvidēre, which meant to provide for or support someone. Próventa was also known as arfsal or arfsala in Old Norse, which derived from the words for inheritance (arfr) and sale (sal). Arfsal is defined as "A transfer of inheritance rights; an agreement by which one person, with the consent of his heirs, gave up his property in exchange for lifelong maintenance."

== History ==
It is not precisely known when the practice of próventa began in Iceland, but there are two instances mentioned in the Bishops' Saga (specifically during the tenure of Bishop Sigvarður Þéttmarsson in Skálholt [1238–1268]), one of which was Þuríður Ormsdóttir, the sister of Snorri Sturluson's wife Hallveig. The oldest mention of próventa comes from a letter written in 1290, suggesting the practice was quite old.

Próventa may have been a custom in other Nordic countries, but written records are hard to come by. In Norway, the archbishop Páll of Nidaros forbade the monasteries from taking in corrodians in 1334. It is possible that the practice continued but was undocumented.

Most commonly, widows paid próventa to abbeys, monasteries, or other religious institutions. It was also common for couples or even siblings to pay their próventa together.

Many abbeys throughout Iceland practiced próventa. However, individual households also sometimes took in corrodians, especially after the abbeys were closed down in the mid-16th century. This custom persisted until around 1900 but may have continued for longer.

== Payment and care ==
As part of their care, corrodians received a room and board, and a clothing allowance. A typical clothing allowance was 20 ells of wadmal per year. Some corrodians also received woven cloth like linen, depending on their contract. Shoes were not typically included in the clothing allowance. Unless there was a special agreement, the foods typically consisted of butter, dried fish, and skyr, but agreements were often established for other types of food, like one case that stipulated that the corrodian receive "enough skyr".

Próventa payments could be made as land or land use rights, goods or livestock, or food.

Some examples of próventa contracts from the Reynistaður abbey:

- In 1380, Jón Bjarnason, on behalf of himself and his sister Guðrún, paid 27 kúgildi, 5 hundreds worth of horses, and 18 hundreds worth of hay, wood, and other goods. In return, he received 7 ells of gray wadmal, 12 ells of white wadmal, and 12 ells of linen each year for clothing. Guðrún received enough to live on plus eight ells of broadcloth per year.
- In 1394, Loðinn Skeggjason gave the abbey his farm in Heiði in Skarð (although Benedikt Brynjólfsson would retain some rights to the land). In exchange, Loðinn received food, 20 ells of broadcloth for clothes, and 2 ells of linen every year.
- In 1459, Helga Finnsdóttir gave the abbey 20 kúgildi and 10 hundreds of livestock. This merited her the "reasonable" diet of butter, dried fish, a fish course, and milk and meat when available. She received 20 lengths of wadmal, a sleeved garment, a measure of linen annually, and material for shoes as needed.

== See also ==
- Corrody
- Corrodian
