= Halldóra Sigvaldadóttir =

16th-century Icelandic abbess

Halldóra Sigvaldadóttir (died after 1544) was the last abbess of the Kirkjubæjar Abbey on Iceland.

Halldóra Sigvaldadóttir was the daughter of Sigvalda Gunnarssonar langalífs, who had a secular position within the church. She is described as a tall woman, in which she resembled her father. The year of her birth is unknown. She is likely to have become abbess just before the year 1500; the last abbess known before her was Oddný, who was mentioned in office in 1488. Her niece Oddný later joined her as a nun in the convent.

She was the aunt of Gissur Einarsson, and is known to have supported his studies and career, which eventually resulted in him becoming Bishop of Skálholt in 1540. She retracted her support when he began to study Luther. As Bishop, he participated in the introduction of the Icelandic Reformation and thereby the dissolution of the monasteries, including that of his aunt. Kirkjubæjar Abbey was declared dissolved and the property of the king and banned from accepting new novices, but the former nuns were allowed to remain in the building if they wished. In 1544, six nuns remained in the convent, and Halldóra Sigvaldadóttir is noted still to have been in charge of them as abbess. The convent is not mentioned more closely after this year, and it is not known exactly when it was truly dissolved and the last nuns left or died, nor is it known when Halldóra Sigvaldadóttir died.

== See also ==
- Solveig Rafnsdóttir
