= Ingibjörg Örnólfsdóttir =

14th-century Icelandic abbess

- Died: 1402
- Occupation: Abbess
- Years active: 1390–1402
- Employer: Reynistaðir Abbey
- Predecessor: Oddbjörg Jónsdóttir
- Successor: Þórunn Ormsdóttir

Ingibjörg Örnólfsdóttir (died 1402) was an abbess in Reynistaðir Abbey, inducted into the position in 1390 after the death of the abbess Oddbjörg Jónsdóttir during the Black Plague.

Ingibjörg was the daughter of Örnólfur Jónsson, a farmer in Staðarfell in Fellsströnd and the sister of Vermundur Örnólfsson, the abbot of Helgafell monastery (Helgafellsklaustur). Her father was wealthy and provided his daughter with 40 hundreds when she joined the convent, which was a lot of money. The manager of the convent during her tenure was the priest Björgólfur Illugason. The nuns at Reynistaðir undoubtedly survived the plague and Björgólfur lived and led the convent at first but he stopped serving as convent manager in spring 1408. Then, sisters Þórunn Ormsdóttir and Þuríður Halldórsdóttir took over managing the convent. Þórunn became a prioress, and there was not an abbess in charge again until 1437.
