= Corrody =

Medieval method of caring for the elderly

A corrody (/ˈkɒrədi/) was a lifetime allowance of food and clothing, and often shelter and care, granted by an abbey, monastery, or other religious house. While rarely granted in the modern era, corrodies were common in the Middle Ages. They were routinely awarded to the servants and household staff of royalty, and as a form of charity for the aged, sick, feeble or those in poverty, but could also be purchased with donations of money or land. The corrody is one of the earliest forms of insurance, as it provided security in sustenance and lodging in a time when social welfare was scarce.

Academic estimates of the annual value of the food allowance (alone), are around £3 per year. This assumes a daily allowance of one loaf of bread and a gallon of ale, but excludes the cost of accommodation and living expenses. When multiplied by the life expectancy of the era (bearing in mind that corrodies would be granted to the old and infirm) it can be assumed that a lifelong corrody for an average person would cost approximately £100.

The prices paid for corrodies varied. In the 15th century a John Underwood of Deeping Lincolnshire, paid £100 for a corrody to the abbot and convent of Peterborough Abbey. This guaranteed him "eight monks' loaves and eight gallons of the better beer" twice a week. He also received either a furred robe or one without fur when the abbot gave livery, and a cloth robe for his wife. At midsummer the abbot also sent him "two stone of cheese, two dozen Paris candles, allowances of oatmeal and salt, and four loads of 'ballowood', i.e. logs." 1n 1432 the abbot of Humberston Abbey in Lincolnshire sold a corrody for ten marks (one mark was worth 160 pence (13 shillings and 4 pence), 2/3 of a pound sterling). This investment was worth 40 shillings a year, which would have used up the ten marks in around three years: but the arrangement had already stood for eight years by 1440, hardly an economical result for the abbey. The abbot of Humberston Abbey had also sold corrodies for 100 marks worth 10 marks a year; one for 10 marks worth a little over 33 shillings a year; and another sold for 20 marks but worth 4 marks (around 53 shillings) a year. By the fifteenth century these corrupt or debased forms of corrody were less likely to be an asset to the monasteries and more of a liability.

The archbishops of Canterbury are recorded as granting only a few charitable corrodies, no more than thirty during the century between 1313 and 1414. The large majority provided only daily food, drink, clothing and a room. For example, archbishop Simon Islip awarded only twelve between 1350 and 1365. The grant was either in money, often between 10 and 12 pence (one shilling) a week, Many beneficiaries of the archbishops' charity lodged at the Hospital of SS Peter and Paul (the Newark Hospital) in Maidstone, or the hospital of St. John the Baptist in Northgate, Canterbury.

== See also ==
- Próventa
