= Arrouaise Abbey =

Augustinian monastery in France

Coordinates: 50.0464°N 2.9101°E

The Abbey of Arrouaise [ɑʁ.wɛz] in northern France was the centre of a form of the canonical life known as the Arrouaisian Order, which was popular among the founders of canonries during the decade of the 1130s. The community began to develop when Heldemar joined the hermit Ruggerius in 1090 and approved by the local bishop in 1097. The priory was raised to the status of an abbey in 1121, electing as its first abbot, Gervaise. He impressed people who had the wealth and secular power, sufficient to found an abbey, which they did.

== Origins ==
The abbey had originated as a hermitage. That had developed into a community which adopted the task of providing a service to travellers through the then, great Forest of Arrouaise in Artois. The Order of Arrouaise was differentiated from others by being basically that of St. Augustine with the more restrained approach of the Cistercians as a guide to its more austere regimen than that of other Canons Regular. In general, as time passed, the distinction between the Arrouaisians and other groups of canons regular was less likely to be made, so that in their later history, Arrouaisian houses were often referred to simply as being houses of canons regular.

The forest where the community was established was in the form of a belt extending westwards from the Forest of The Ardennes, to the north of the town of Saint-Quentin and towards the town of Bapaume. It is now largely felled. Traffic passed through the forest, in many cases along the remaining lines of Roman roads. The routes were important commercially and diplomatically for traffic between Paris and Flanders, also between England and Burgundy. It will have been mainly by this route that the English and Western Flemings went to Rome on pilgrimages and diplomatic journeys.

The abbey elected its first abbot, Gervaise in 1121 and was suppressed in 1790, during the course of the French Revolution.

== Geography ==
On the whole, scholars seem vague about where the abbey itself was. It is possible that 'arrouaise' is an adjective indicating a connection with Arras or, by extension, with Artois, but in the 20th century, at least, these adjectives were respectively 'arrageois' and 'artesian'. However, within the appropriate area and in the higher land between the sources of rivers such as the Somme, Sambre and Escaut, there is a hamlet called l’Arrouaise. It lies at the end of a turning off a back road, the D272 (département of Aisne), 11.5 km (7.1 mi) south-east of the place known to British military historians as Le Cateau. The out-of-the-way position of l'Arrouaise would have been appropriate to the hermitage origins but would not be convenient in developing the tradition of service to travellers.

More plausibly there was a small abbey, founded in the 11th century, "in the middle of the Forest of Arrouaise", at Aubencheul-aux-Bois near the N44 and about halfway between Cambrai and St. Quentin. It lies between Mesnil-en-Arrouaise (10 km [6.2 mi] SE of Bapaume) and Montigny-en-Arrouaise (15 km [9.3 mi] ENE of St. Quentin). Auboncheul lies on the border between Picardy and Hainaut as represented by the départements of Aisne and Nord. This site, on the St Quentin to Cambrai road, is much better suited to serving travellers, being on both the Paris to Mechelen and the London to Dijon roads. That means the France to Flanders and England to Burgundy diplomatic routes, as well as that from England and western Flanders to Rome. Besides these, the commercial traffic between Italy and Flanders grew in importance during the medieval period. Both Cambrai and St Quentin were part of it. Four kilometres to the south of Aubencheul is Gouy, which used to be called Gouy en Arrouaise. The foundation charters of Bourne Abbey in Lincolnshire and Missenden Abbey in Buckinghamshire both describe the dedication of Arrouaise as being to St Nicholas.

There is an aerial photograph of the site as a crop mark.

== Arrouaisian houses ==
=== In England ===
- Bourne Abbey (SS Peter and Paul)
- Beaulieu
- Carlisle Cathedral
- Dorchester Abbey, Oxfordshire (St. Peter)
- Harrold Priory
- Lesnes Abbey
- Lilleshall Abbey
- Missenden Abbey
- Notley Abbey (SS Mary and John the Baptist)
- Warter

=== In France ===
- Arrouaise Abbey (St. Nicholas)
- Autrey
- Beaulieu Abbey (Saint Graal)
- Abbaye Notre-Dame d'Hénin-Liétard

=== In Ireland ===
- Annaghdown
- Bangor
- Ballinskelligs
- Clonard
- Dublin
- Duleek
- Durrow
- Kells
- Knock
- Knock Abbey, County Louth.
- Louth
- Navan
- Saul
- Termonfeckin
- Trim

=== Scotland ===
- Cambuskenneth Abbey (St. Mary)
