= Jón Þorvaldsson (abbot) =

Icelandic priest

Jón Þorvaldsson (died 12 May 1514) was an Icelandic priest at Höskuldsstaðir in Skagaströnd and then an abbot in Þingeyraklaustur from around 1500. However, he had been in charge of the monastery since his uncle, Ásgrímur Jónsson, died in 1495.
