= Kúgildi =

Obsolete Icelandic unit of value

Kúgildi, or kvígildi, is an old standard of value in bartering in Iceland. A kúgildi was equivalent to the value of one cow—the word literally translates to "cow value"—which was equal to six woolly pregnant sheep. A kúgildi was also an appurtenance tenancy of leasehold land that each resident had to hand over to the next tenant who took over the property from them.

Kúgildi have differed in value over time. Around 1200, a kúgildi was three hundredweights of cheese or butter. In the 13th century, a kúgildi was, for instance, estimated at one-hundred ells of wadmal, that is, a "big hundred", or 120. In the 15th century, it was valued at 120 plump fish, that is, 40 at a weight of four marks and 80 at five marks.
