= Heldemar =

Blessed Heldemar (died 1098) was a medieval Augustinian canon regular, and one of the founders of Arrouaise Abbey.

== Life ==
Heldemar was from Tournai in the Low Countries and was attached to the court of William the Conqueror as a chaplain. Around 1090, disgusted with court life, he joined the hermit Roger in the Forest of Arrouaise. Together with Cuno of Praeneste, he transformed a loose group of followers into a house living according to the Rule of St Augustine. Heldemar governed the house as prior. In 1097 or 1098, an outlaw who had entered the monastery murdered Roger and fatally injured Heldemar. His date of death is traditionally commemorated as 13 January 1098. Cuno, who became leader of the community after Heldemar's death, rebuilt the monastery's wooden chapel in stone, enshrining Heldemar's remains within it as the relics of a saint.
