= Grindlow =

Hamlet in Derbyshire, England

Coordinates: 53.2947°N 1.7298°W

- Location within Derbyshire
- OS grid reference: SK177777
- District: Derbyshire Dales
- Shire county: Derbyshire
- Region: East Midlands
- Country: England
- Sovereign state: United Kingdom
- Post town: BUXTON
- Postcode district: SK17
- Dialling code: 01298
- Police: Derbyshire
- Fire: Derbyshire
- Ambulance: East Midlands
- UK Parliament: Derbyshire Dales

Grindlow is a farming hamlet of a dozen or so houses that nestles under Hucklow Edge in the Derbyshire Peak District. Although it is a separate civil parish in the Derbyshire Dales District, the Parish Council is joint with Great Hucklow, its near neighbour, and Little Hucklow. The village lies north of the A623 road as it crosses Wardlow Mires. It is a familiar stop for groups of walkers passing through from Foolow, Wardlow and Abney.

At its centre lies Grind Low, a small limestone knoll surmounted by a few trees. There are also two Bronze Age burial mounds near the footpath to Foolow.

Grindlow was a mining village for many centuries. After the demise of mining, agriculture remained as the principal form of income.
