= Reynistaðarklaustur =

Catholic monastery in Iceland, 1295–1562

Reynistaðarklaustur (Modern Icelandic: [ˈreiːnɪˌstaːðarˌkʰlœystʏr̥]; Old Norse: Reynistaðarklaustr [ˈrœyneˌstɑðɑz̠ˌklɔustz̠]) or Reynistathir abbey was a Catholic monastery in Iceland, belonging to the Order of Saint Benedict and active from 1295 until 1562, when it was closed down during the Icelandic Reformation It was one of nine monasteries on the island, and one out of only two to house nuns, the other one being Kirkjubæjar Abbey. Located in Skagafjörður, it fell under the authority of the Bishop of Hólar.

When Jarl Gissur Þorvaldsson died in 1268, he donated his holdings in Reynistaðar to the Catholic Church, to house a religious community. It took three decades for this to happen, when finally Bishop Jörundur Þorsteinsson – together with Hallbera Þorsteinsdóttir, later Abbess, and a number of other wealthy women – took the initiative to found the convent once and for all. Some of Hallbera's successors include Guðný Helgadóttir, Oddbjörg Jónsdóttir, Ingibjörg Örnólfsdóttir, Þórunn Ormsdóttir, Þóra Finnsdóttir, and Agnes Jónsdóttir. The convent declined significantly during the Black Death, and for several years there was no abbess present.

The last abbess of Reynistaðarklaustur was Solveig Rafnsdóttir. The monastery's lands and properties were confiscated during the introduction of Protestantism, causing Solveig to lose her authority. The last few nuns were allowed to remain for life in the defunct monastery.
