= Icelandic grammar =

Grammar of the Icelandic language

Icelandic grammar is the set of structural rules that describe the use of the Icelandic language.

Icelandic is a heavily inflected language. Icelandic nouns are assigned to one of three grammatical genders (masculine, feminine, or neuter), and are declined into four cases (nominative, accusative, dative, and genitive). Nominals decline into two numbers: singular and plural, and verbs conjugate for person, number, tense, mood, and voice.

== Morphology ==
Icelandic morphology is prototypical of Germanic/Indo-European languages. Nouns decline for case, number and gender. Adjectives decline for case, number, gender, degree (i.e., positive, comparative, and superlative), and definiteness (i.e. weak and strong). In nouns, definiteness and non-definiteness depend on articles, but are not related to strong and weak declension types. In nouns, weak and strong declension types describe endings expressing gender, case, and number, rather than definiteness and non-definiteness.

Icelandic has only a definite article, which can stand on its own or be attached to its modified noun. Verbs are conjugated for tense, mood, person, number and voice. There are three voices: active, passive and medial. There are only two simple tenses, past and present, along with a number of auxiliary constructions, some of which may be regarded as tenses, others as aspects.

=== Nouns ===
Icelandic nouns are declined in four cases: nominative, accusative, dative and genitive. They belong to three main noun classes (masculine, feminine, neuter) and can be inflected for number (singular, plural) and definiteness (definite, indefinite). There are two main declension paradigms for nouns from all noun classes: strong nouns (i.e. root ending in consonant) and weak nouns (root ending in a vowel), which are further divided in smaller groups for declension, according to many criteria (sound-shifts, consonant clusters, etc.) The following table shows four examples of strong declension.

Examples of strong declension
number	case	masculine	feminine	neuter	
singular	nom.	hattur	borg	glas	gler
singular	acc.	hatt	borg	glas	gler
singular	dat.	hatti	borg	glasi	gleri
singular	gen.	hatts	borgar	glass	glers
plural	nom.	hattar	borgir	glös	gler
plural	acc.	hatta	borgir	glös	gler
plural	dat.	höttum	borgum	glösum	gler(j)um
plural	gen.	hatta	borga	glasa	gler(j)a

The gender of a noun can often be surmised by looking at the ending of the word:

- Masculine nouns—often end in -ur, -i, -ll, or -nn in the nominative.
- Feminine nouns—often end in -a, -ing, or -un in the nominative.
- Neuter nouns—usually have no ending or have a final accented vowel in the nominative.

But this is not always reliable. Many endings overlap between genders (see how the -a ending appears in the strong masculine, feminine, and neuter), and exceptions and more complicated rules make this type of discernation impossible. For example, the word Norður (north) is a neuter noun, although it ends in -ur which is typically reserved for masculine nouns.

=== Articles ===
Icelandic does not have an indefinite article (a/an in English), and the definite article (the in English) is usually joined to the end of the word. The table below shows the different suffix forms for the three genders in the nominative. This list is not exhaustive, and there are numerous exceptions in every case.

Suffix forms of Icelandic nouns in the nominative
Gender	No article		Definite article	
Gender	Singular	Plural	Singular	Plural
Masculine	-ur	-ar	-urinn	-arnir
Masculine	-i	-ar	-inn	-arnir
Masculine	-ll	-ar	-llinn	-arnir
Masculine	-nn	-ar	-nninn	-arnir
Feminine	–	-ir	-in	-irnar
Feminine	-a	-ur	-an	-urnar
Neuter	–	–	-ið	-in

The examples below show three nouns, one for each respective gender, declined in the nominative:

- masculine: drengur—"(a) boy" becomes drengurinn—"the boy"
- feminine: stúlka—"(a) girl" becomes stúlkan—"the girl"
- neuter: barn—"(a) child" becomes barnið—"the child"

The independent, or free-standing, definite article (not attached to the noun as a suffix) exists in Icelandic in the form hinn. It is used mostly in poetry and irregularly elsewhere (there are hardly any rules for the latter case; it is mainly a matter of taste).

=== Pronouns ===
==== Personal ====
The personal pronouns in Icelandic are as follows:

	case	1st person	2nd person	3rd person		
	case	1st person	2nd person	masculine	feminine	neuter
singular	nom.	ég	þú	hann	hún	það
singular	acc.	mig	þig	hann	hana	það
singular	dat.	mér	þér	honum	henni	því
singular	gen.	mín	þín	hans	hennar	þess
plural	nom.	við	þið	þeir	þær	þau
plural	acc.	okkur	ykkur	þá	þær	þau
plural	dat.	okkur	ykkur	þeim		
plural	gen.	okkar	ykkar	þeirra		

Icelandic has separate masculine, feminine and neuter words for they. The masculine is used when referring to an all masculine group, the feminine for an all feminine group, and the neuter for either an all neuter or a mixed-gender group.

Like in English, the pronoun usually comes before the verb, as in the example below:

ég heiti Magnús—I am called Magnús

But, just as easily, the order of the sentence may be inverted. In this case, the pronoun moves to the end of the sentence:

Magnús heiti ég—Magnús I am called (or, literally Magnús called am I)

In English, changing the word order like this would either render a phrase nonsensical or make it sound poetic. This is mainly due to the fact that whilst being a Germanic language, English has lost most of its noun declension. See syntax for more information.

Icelandic has also two extra lesser used personal pronouns. They are as follows:

case	1st person	2nd person
nom.	vér	þér
acc.	oss	yður
dat.	oss	yður
gen.	vor	yðar

These two personal pronouns are now archaic. They are a leftover from the Old Icelandic (and Old Norse) use of a dual number along with the singular and plural when it came to the 1st and 2nd person pronouns. Modern Icelandic plural forms of those pronouns (við and þið) are what were the dual number form, while the old plurals (vér and þér) are now only used in formal speech.

==== Reflexive ====
Icelandic possesses a reflexive pronoun, functioning in much the same way as German sich, although unlike German it also has a dative and a genitive. The nominative case does not exist.

case	pronoun
acc.	sig
dat.	sér
gen.	sín

For example,

hann þvær sér—he washes himself,

as opposed to being bathed by another,

hún klæðir sig—she dresses herself,

as opposed to being dressed. The pronoun does not distinguish gender or number.

==== Possessive ====
Modern Icelandic has only possessive pronouns for the first-person singular, second-person singular and the third-person reflexive. They are as follows, where the three columns for each person represent masculine, feminine and neuter genders respectively:

	case	1st person			2nd person			3rd person		
singular	nom.	minn	mín	mitt	þinn	þín	þitt	sinn	sín	sitt
singular	acc.	minn	mína	mitt	þinn	þína	þitt	sinn	sína	sitt
singular	dat.	mínum	minni	mínu	þínum	þinni	þínu	sínum	sinni	sínu
singular	gen.	míns	minnar	míns	þíns	þinnar	þíns	síns	sinnar	síns
plural	nom.	mínir	mínar	mín	þínir	þínar	þín	sínir	sínar	sín
plural	acc.	mína	mínar	mín	þína	þínar	þín	sína	sínar	sín
plural	dat.	mínum			þínum			sínum		
plural	gen.	minna			þinna			sinna		

Minn means mine, þinn means (singular) yours and sinn (which is a reflexive possessive pronoun) means his, her, its or theirs. If one is to indicate possession for a person and number not amongst these pronouns (e.g. ours, plural yours, non-reflexive his, hers, its and theirs) the genitive of the corresponding (same person and number) personal pronoun is used.

Icelandic also has a possessive of the archaic personal pronoun vér.

case	singular			plural		
nom.	vor		vort	vorir	vorar	vor
acc.	vorn	vora	vort	vora	vorar	vor
dat.	vorum	vorri	voru	vorum		
gen.	vors	vorrar	vors	vorra		

This possessive is only used in formal or official situations, and means ours.

==== Demonstrative ====
The Icelandic demonstrative pronouns are as follows, where the three columns for each person represent masculine, feminine and neuter genders respectively:

	case	"this"			"that"			"the other"		
singular	nom.	þessi		þetta	sá	sú	það	hinn	hin	hitt
singular	acc.	þennan	þessa	þetta	þann	þá	það	hinn	hina	hitt
singular	dat.	þessum	þessari	þessu	þeim	þeirri	því	hinum	hinni	hinu
singular	gen.	þessa	þessarar	þessa	þess	þeirrar	þess	hins	hinnar	hins
plural	nom.	þessir	þessar	þessi	þeir	þær	þau	hinir	hinar	hin
plural	acc.	þessa	þessar	þessi	þá	þær	þau	hina	hinar	hin
plural	dat.	þessum			þeim			hinum		
plural	gen.	þessara			þeirra			hinna		

Þessi and sá roughly correspond to this and that, and hinn means the other one of two.

==== Indefinite ====
There are around fifteen to twenty of these, depending on how they are counted. A paradigm for enginn (nobody) is given below.

nobody	case	Masculine	Feminine	Neuter
singular	nom.	enginn	engin	ekkert
singular	acc.	engan	enga	ekkert
singular	dat.	engum	engri	engu
singular	gen.	einskis	engrar	einskis
plural	nom.	engir	engar	engin
plural	acc.	enga	engar	engin
plural	dat.	engum		
plural	gen.	engra		

=== Numerals ===
The numbers one to four are declined for the respective cases and genders:

one	masculine	feminine	neuter
nominative	einn	ein	eitt
accusative	einn	eina	eitt
dative	einum	einni	einu
genitive	eins	einnar	eins

two	masculine	feminine	neuter
nominative	tveir	tvær	tvö
accusative	tvo	tvær	tvö
dative	tveimur		
genitive	tveggja		

three	masculine	feminine	neuter
nominative	þrír	þrjár	þrjú
accusative	þrjá	þrjár	þrjú
dative	þremur		
genitive	þriggja		

four	masculine	feminine	neuter
nominative	fjórir	fjórar	fjögur
accusative	fjóra	fjórar	fjögur
dative	fjórum		
genitive	fjögurra		

Other numbers are as follows and not declined, except for those that are actually nouns:

five
fimm

six
sex

seven
sjö

eight
átta

nine
níu

ten
tíu

eleven
ellefu

twelve
tólf

thirteen
þrettán

fourteen
fjórtán

fifteen
fimmtán

sixteen
sextán

seventeen
sautján

eighteen
átján

nineteen
nítján

twenty
tuttugu

twenty-one
tuttugu og einn

thirty
þrjátíu

forty
fjörutíu

fifty
fimmtíu

sixty
sextíu

seventy
sjötíu

eighty
áttatíu

ninety
níutíu

(one) hundred
(eitt) hundrað

(one) thousand
(eitt) þúsund

(one) million
(ein) milljón

zero
núll

The word hundrað is actually a neuter noun, þúsund can be either feminine or neuter and the higher multiples of a thousand are either masculine or feminine, according to the ending (e.g. milljón is feminine, milljarður is masculine and so on). Núll is neuter.

=== Adjectives ===
Adjectives must agree with the gender, number and grammatical case of the nouns they describe. For example, the word íslenskur (Icelandic) agrees as follows:

Icelandic (strong)	case	Masculine	Feminine	Neuter
singular	nom.	íslenskur	íslensk	íslenskt
singular	acc.	íslenskan	íslenska	íslenskt
singular	dat.	íslenskum	íslenskri	íslensku
singular	gen.	íslensks	íslenskrar	íslensks
plural	nom.	íslenskir	íslenskar	íslensk
plural	acc.	íslenska	íslenskar	íslensk
plural	dat.	íslenskum		
plural	gen.	íslenskra		

In strong declension, for example:

Ég bý með íslenskri konu—I live with an Icelandic woman

Both íslenskri and konu are dative singular. In this case, the preposition með governs the case (með can also take the accusative). This is an example of strong declension of adjectives. If an adjective is modified by the article, or most pronouns, weak declension is used. For this word it would be íslenski:

Icelandic (weak)	case	Masculine	Feminine	Neuter
singular	nom.	íslenski	íslenska	íslenska
singular	acc., dat., gen.	íslenska	íslensku	íslenska
plural	All cases	íslensku		

An example of weak declension:

Ég sá veiku konuna—I saw the sick woman

Veiku is the weak declension of veikur (sick) in the accusative singular. Konuna is also accusative singular, but with the definite article attached (-na), and the article forces the adjective to be weak. Here the verb governs the case. The weak forms of nouns are often found in names of organisations, symbols, days and titles, for example:

- 'Íslenski fáninn'—the Icelandic flag
- 'Sumardagurinn fyrsti'—the First Day of Summer

Here there are far fewer forms to learn, three in total, although one has to learn how they are distributed.

=== Verbs ===
There are three moods in Icelandic: indicative, imperative, and subjunctive. As with most inflected languages, the verbs in Icelandic determine (or govern) the case of the subsequent nouns, pronouns and adjectives of a sentence. For example:

- Safna ('to collect or save') governs the dative case:

'Ég er að safna peningum til þess að geta keypt jólagjöf handa mömmu.'
I am saving money to be able to buy a Christmas gift for Mum. (peningum is the dative plural form of peningur "coin")

- Sakna ("to miss") governs the genitive case:

'Ég sakna þín'
I miss you

In the infinitive, most Icelandic verbs end in -a. Some exceptions include a few verbs ending in -á, such as slá ('hit'); flá ('flay'). Other exceptions include the auxiliaries munu and skulu; þvo (wash), which was originally þvá; and a verb borrowed from Danish, ske (happen). There are three main groups of weak verbs in Icelandic: -ar, -ir, and -ur, referring to the endings that these verbs take when conjugated in the third person singular present. The strong verbs and the irregular verbs (auxiliaries, ri-verbs and valda) are a separate matter. Take the infinitive tala ('to talk'), for example:

Number	Singular			Plural		
Person	ég I	þú you (sg.)	hann/hún/það he/she/it	við we	þið you (pl.)	þeir/þær/þau they
tala to talk	tala talk	talar talk(s)		tölum talk	talið talk	tala talk
vera to be	er am	ert are	er is	erum are	eruð are	eru are
læra to learn	læri learn	lærir learn(s)		lærum learn	lærið learn	læra learn
velja to choose	vel choose	velur choose(s)		veljum choose	veljið choose	velja choose

Note how, for each of the verb groups, the conjugations in the singular change but, in the plural, the endings are nearly always predictable (-um, -ið and -a, respectively). Most English present verbs are regular and have only one change in ending (-s for third person singular). In most cases in Icelandic, the conjugation patterns remain regular across most verbs. The conjugation of a verb cannot be determined from its infinitive. Speakers must memorize which conjugation group a verb belongs to. Strong verbs fall into six groups augmented by reduplication verbs, each with exceptions (such as auxiliary verbs, the r-verbs, and the only verb in Icelandic that has been called 'totally irregular', valda). There is a classification system for all verbs, with the paradigms going into the dozens. The simplification of inflections through person and number seen in Danish (and standard Norwegian & Swedish) with the adoption of the 3.p.s. is seen only in the first person in the conditional and in first person in the past tense where it is formed with suffix and with the first verb (to be) where em was replaced with er.

Some Icelandic infinitives end with a -ja suffix. These verbs can be conjugated like -ur verbs, with the suffix lost in the first person singular. When conjugating -ja verbs, the single j must be removed, so syngja ('to sing') would become ég syng ('I sing') in the first person singular and not ég syngj (and syngja is a strong verb (past tense söng), so irregularities are to be expected). The j in itself is not a reliable indicator. Examples could be emja ('squeal'), which belongs to one class (singular, first person, ég emja, past tense ég emjaði) versus telja ('count'), belonging to another class, (ég tel, past tense ég taldi).

The six categories of Icelandic verbs are as follows:

- -a verbs, which form the past indicative with an -aði ending;
- -i verbs, which form the past indicative with a -ði, -di, or -ti ending;
- strong verbs, which form the past indicative with no ending and a vowel shift;
- ey-j-ur verbs, which form the past tense with an ending like the -i verbs but with a vowel shift;
- hybrid verbs, which form the past tense like strong verbs (or with a vowel shift) and present tense like -i verbs or vice-versa;
- preterite-present verbs, which form the present tense with the past tense ending of strong verbs.

This classification, with its focus on inflectional features rather than etymologies, leaves very few irregular verbs. The verb 'valda' for example, becomes a totally regular one in the 2nd strong class.

==== Tenses ====
Strictly speaking, there are only two simple tenses in Icelandic, simple present and simple past. All other tenses are formed using auxiliary constructions (some of these are regarded as tenses, others as aspects). For example, the present continuous is formed thus:

vera + að + infinitive verb
ég er að læra
I am learning (literal translation) I am to learn

This construction is not usually used with stative verbs. For example, to sit would not use this construction. Instead, the simple present should be used (ég sit).

The compound tenses are:

- conditional
- future
- past
  - continuous
  - perfect
  - subjunctive
- present
  - continuous
  - perfect
  - subjunctive

==== Voice ====
Icelandic possesses the middle voice in addition to both the active and passive. Verbs in the middle voice always end in -st; this ending can be added to both the infinitive and conjugated verb forms. For the conjugated forms, second and third person endings (i.e. -(u)r, -ð and -rð) must be removed, as must any dental consonants (ð, d and t). Compare the verb breyta ('to change') to its middle voice forms, for example:

breyta to change	breyti change	breytir change(s)	breytum change	breytið change	breyta change
breytast to change	breytist change(s)		breytumst change	breytist change	breytast change

The middle voice form of many verbs carries a slightly different meaning, and in some cases may carry a different meaning altogether. Some verbs survive only in their middle voice form, the other forms having been lost over time. The middle voice is generally used in the following situations to express:

- Reflexivity—The middle voice form of a verb may be used in lieu of a reflexive pronoun, for example: Þór klæðir sig ⇒ Þór klæðist ('Þór gets dressed')
- Reciprocity—Here the middle voice is used to mean 'each other', for example: Þór talar við Stefán og Stefán talar við Þór ⇒ Þór og Stefán talast við ('Þór and Stefán talk to each other')
- An alternative meaning—As previously mentioned, some middle voice verbs carry different meanings than their counterparts. Examples include koma ('to come') becoming komast ('to get there') and gera ('to do') becoming gerast ('to happen')
- The passive—In certain situations, the middle voice may express an idea for which English would use the passive. For example, the phrase, Bíllinn sést ekki, translates as 'The car cannot be seen'. Most often the middle voice is used in this context when there is no direct reference to any grammatical person.
- In reported speech—When the subject of reported speech is the same of that reporting, the middle voice may be used. For example, Hann sagðist ekki lesa bókina, translates to, 'He said (that) he didn't read the book'. Note three special features of this construction: 1) the use of the infinitive 'lesa' in the subordinate clause; 2) the placement of 'ekki'; and 3) the lack of the complementizer 'að', corresponding to English 'that'.
- To form verbs from nouns—The middle voice can also be used to form verbs from nouns. For example, from the noun glanni which means 'a reckless person', comes the verb að glannast, meaning 'to act like a reckless person'.

==== Subjunctive mood ====
Like many other Indo-European languages, Icelandic has the subjunctive mood. It is often used to refer to situations with a degree of hypotheticity, but more specifically in the following situations:

- In reported speech—It is used with the verb segja in the following sense: Jón segir að hún komi ('Jón says that she's coming').
- To express uncertainty—Used after the verbs vona ('to hope'), óska ('to wish'), halda ('to believe'), búast við ('to expect'), óttast/vera hræddur um ('to fear/to be afraid of'), and gruna ('to suspect'): ég vona að henni batni ('I hope that she gets better')
- Interrogative sentences—Specifically after the verb spyrja ('to ask'): Jón spyr hvort þú ætlir að borða með okkur ('Jón asks whether you're going to eat with us')
- With conjunctions—The subjunctive is used after the conjunctions nema ('unless'), þó að/þótt ('although'), svo að ('so that'), til þess að ('in order to')

=== Adverbs ===
Compared to other lexical categories, Icelandic adverbs are relatively simple, and are not declined, except in some cases for comparison. They can be constructed easily from adjectives, nouns and verbs. These derived adverbs often end in -lega (approximately equivalent to the -ly suffix in English):

nýr—new ⇒ nýlega—lately (lit. newly)

The adverbs ending in -lega can be declined for comparison.

hætta—danger ⇒ hættulega→hættulegar→hættulegast, i.e. dangerously→more dangerously→most dangerously.

This is a regular way to form adverbs. Another way is to take the neutral nominative singular of an adjective and turn it into an adverb:

blítt—gentle ⇒ blítt—gently, cf. hún sefur blítt—she sleeps gently

Another way is taking the stem of an adjective and add an a:

illur—bad ⇒ illa—badly, cf. hann hagar sér illa—he behaves badly (illur never takes the -lega suffix).

Like in English, many common adverbs do not stick to these patterns but are adverbs in their own right:

bráðum—soon
núna—now
oft—often
strax—right away

The basic adverbs of direction include:

austur—east
norður—north
suður—south
vestur—west
inn—in
innan—from within
utan—from outside
út—out

Inn and út denote motion, going in and going out.

== Other word classes ==
=== Prepositions ===
In Icelandic, prepositions determine the case of the following noun. Some examples are given below:

accusative	dative	genitive	acc. or dat. depending on context
um—about	að—at, with	til—to	á—on
gegnum—through	af—of	án—without	eftir—after
umfram—in addition	frá—from	meðal—amongst	fyrir—before
kringum—around	hjá—with	milli—between	í—in
umhverfis—around	úr—out of	sökum—due to	með—with
	andspænis—opposite	vegna—because	undir—under
	ásamt—along	handan—beyond	við—by
	gagnvart—towards	innan—inside	yfir—over
	gegn—through	utan—outside	
	gegnt—vis-à-vis	ofan—above	
	handa—for	neðan—below	
	meðfram—along		
	móti—opposite, against		
	undan—from under		

The case governed by prepositions depends on the context. The most frequent occurrence of this is determined by whether or not motion towards or away from is implied by the context: í, á, eftir, yfir and undir are all affected in this way. The following examples demonstrate this:

Jón fer á veitingahúsið—Jón goes to the restaurant

Here the preposition á governs the accusative case because specific motion towards/away from is implied, i.e. going to the restaurant.

Jón er á veitingahúsinu—Jón is at the restaurant

In this example, the preposition á governs the dative; here the situation is static with no motion towards or away from implied. Yfir, undir and eftir all behave in the same way:

Kötturinn skríður undir rúmið—The cat crawls under the bed

Here the use of the accusative implies that the cat was not under the bed before, but is on its way there now.

Kötturinn skríður undir rúminu—The cat is crawling under the bed

Here, the use of the dative implies an unchanging situation. Now the cat is still crawling, but within the confines of under the bed. Note that to govern the accusative, the preposition must imply movement towards or away from something, that is to say a changing situation. If the situation is static, i.e., the same at the end as it was at the start, then the preposition governs the dative.

== Syntax ==
=== Basic word order ===
Icelandic word order is SVO (subject–verb–object), generally speaking, with the subject and verb inverted in questions and when a sentence begins with an adverb. However, the inflectional system allows for considerable freedom in word order. For poetical purposes, every combination is possible, even the rare OSV. The phrase Helga Bjarni drap (Bjarni killed Helgi) might well occur in poetry such as a ríma.

Despite this, certain rules of syntax are relatively inflexible. For example, the finite verb must always be the second constituent of declarative sentences (this is a feature known as V2 word order, as is common to many Germanic languages). Take the example below (subject in yellow, verb in blue, object in red):

Mannfjöldinn var 1.500—The population was 1,500

Here the element var (the past tense third person singular form of the verb vera, 'to be', i.e. 'was') is the second constituent of the sentence. If we change the sentence, however:

Árið 2000 var mannfjöldinn 1.500—In 2000, the population was 1,500 (lit. The year 2000 was the population 1,500)

Here, var is still the second constituent of the sentence, despite the fact that it is not the second word in the sentence. The prepositional phrase árið 2000 (highlighted in green) counts as one constituent, and so for the verb to be the second constituent, it must come after 2000 and not after árið. The subject and object of the verb then follow. An exception to this rule arises when forming questions by inversion:

Stefán er svangur—Stefán is hungry

and when turned into a question:

Er Stefán svangur?—Is Stefán hungry?

Here the subject and verb have been inverted to form a question, meaning the verb is the first constituent in the sentence as opposed to the second. This method of forming questions is used in many languages, including English.

=== Questions ===
As we have seen, questions can be easily formed by rearranging the order of the sentence from subject–verb–object to verb–subject–object. For example:

Þú talar íslensku.—You speak Icelandic.

can be made into a question as follows:

Talarðu íslensku?—Do you speak Icelandic? (lit. Speak you Icelandic?) ('þú' here merges with the verb and becomes '-ðu', a common shift when the pronoun is behind the verb)

The inversion rule still applies when interrogatives are involved, which are simply added to the front of the sentence. The interrogatives in Icelandic are:

- hvað?—what/how?
  - Hvað ert þú að gera?—What are you doing? (lit. What are you to do?)
- hvaða?—which/what?
  - Hvaða hundur?—What dog?
- hver?—who?
  - Hver ert þú?—Who are you?
- hvernig?—how?
  - Hvernig hefur þú það?—How are you? (lit. How have you it?)
- hvar/hvert/hvaðan?—where/whither/whence?
  - Hvar ert þú?—Where are you?
  - Hvert ert þú að fara?—Where are you going? (lit. Whither are you to go?)
  - Hvaðan kemur þú?—Where do you come from? (lit. Whence come you?)
- hvenær?—when?
  - Hvenær kemur þú?—When do you come? (lit. When come you?)
- hvers vegna/af hverju/hví?—why?
  - Hvers vegna hann?—Why him?
  - Af hverju ekki?—Why not?
  - Hví?—Why?
- hvort?—whether/which?
  - Hvort hann komi, veit ég ekki.—I don't know whether he's coming or not. (lit. Whether he comes, know I not.)
  - Hvort vilt þú?—Which do you want? (lit. Which want you?, implying a choice between two alternatives.)

However, interrogative pronouns (hvað/hver) must decline with the verb that they modify, so the case of the pronoun changes depending on the verb. The meaning of a sentence does not change whether hvers vegna or af hverju is used; however they are used in a specific manner in Icelandic. Also of note, hví is rarely used.

=== Causatives ===
Icelandic has a causative construction that can feel quite alien to English speakers (but which is similar to constructions in other languages). The word láta is used to mean "let" or "make". In one use, it is quite similar to English.

- Hún lét mig byggja húsið.—She made me build the house.

However, in another use, the intermediate subject is left out, but the second verb is still in the infinitive.

- Hún lét byggja húsið.—She had the house built. (lit. "She made build the house"; however, compare correct French 'Elle a fait construire la maison' and Dutch 'Ze liet het huis bouwen')

The syntax here seems somewhat similar to a use of the verb help in English, when speakers say She helped build the house.

== Sound shifts ==
There are a number of sound shifts that occur in Icelandic, detailed below. The shifts occur very frequently across all word classes. For one of the most thorough books about the subject see Íslenzk málfræði handa æðri skólum.

=== A-umlaut ===
This is the oldest umlaut of all, attested in every Germanic language except, perhaps, Gothic. It comes in two varieties:

i ⇒ e (as for instance in niður vs. neðan).
u ⇒ o. Well known examples include fugl (cf. English fowl) or stofa (cf. German Stube).

This umlaut is no longer productive.

=== U-umlaut ===
The U-umlaut occurs when a stem vowel a changes to ö because of a u in the next syllable. This affects a only, and not á or au. Some examples:

tala—talk ⇒ (við) tölum—(we) talk
fara—go ⇒ (við) förum—(we) go

If there is an intermediate syllable between the first a and the u, then the U-shift does not take place.

Although u-umlaut used to be completely regular in that every a followed by u was changed to ö, now there are new u's that don't trigger it from the Old Norse -r ending. Everywhere -r didn't stand by a vowel an u was inserted in front of it, like in vanur from older vanr. This happened after u-umlaut had already taken place and therefore doesn't trigger it, causing a bit of irregularity in the Modern Icelandic u-umlaut.

U-umlaut is not to be confused with breaking, although they appear similar.

Note that if there are two a's preceding the u, the first a becomes an ö and the second becomes a u. An example:

fagnaður—joy ⇒ fögnuðum—joys (dative, plural).

Exceptions to this include several borrowings, for instance banani—banana ⇒ banönum (dative plural) and Arabi—Arab ⇒ Aröbum (also dative plural). Though bönunum is still used as well.

There is also the "phantom" U-umlaut where some words historically ended in an -u but dropped the vowel, the change still occurs, some examples:

saddur-(masculine) ⇒ södd-(feminine) satiated
danskur-(masculine) ⇒ dönsk-(feminine) Danish

Historically, there were four more additional forms of the U-umlaut; these are no longer productive or have been reversed.

=== I-umlaut ===
The I-umlaut is slightly more complex, and consists of the following vowel changes:

a ⇒ e
á ⇒ æ
e ⇒ i
o ⇒ e
ó ⇒ æ
u ⇒ y (It sometimes appears as if o ⇒ y, but this is never the case. An example: Sonur (singular) ⇒ synir (plural) might give the impression of an I-umlaut, but the original vowel in sonur was u changed to o by the A-umlaut.)
ú, jú and jó ⇒ ý
au ⇒ ey

The above effects of the I-umlaut are most visible in strong verbs. Take the verb hafa ('to have'), for example:

Number	Singular			Plural		
Person	ég I	þú you	hann/hún/það he/she/it	við we	þið you (pl.)	þeir/þær/þau they
hafa to have	hef have	hefur have/has		höfum have	hafið have	hafa have

In the singular conjugation, the I-umlaut has caused the stem a to become an e. If we look at the plural conjugation however, we can see that the stem a remains intact here, with the notable exception of the 'við' form, where a U-umlaut has taken place (thanks to the -um ending). The I-shift affects verbs only in their singular conjugations.

(The verb hafa actually has two acceptable conjugations. The first is the above, the second goes (ég) hefi, (þú) hefir, (hann) hefir.)

Less known, non-productive and reversed changes include:

o ⇒ ø
ǫ ⇒ ø

=== Other umlauts ===
Historically, there were many more umlauts in Icelandic, including

- R-umlaut
- J-umlaut
- G/K-umlaut
- W-umlaut

These are much more limited in scope, and operate more or less in the same way as the above-mentioned umlauts (i.e. have more or less the same effect). Having mentioned reversed or non-productive umlauts above, it remains to be stressed that the I- and U-umlauts are very much alive, both as a fixture of the declension system as well as being useful tools for composing neologisms. This applies to breaking as well.

=== Elision ===
A form of elision occurs when asking questions in the second person; the verb and þú have a tendency to merge to ease pronunciation. This is reflected in writing, and so one would more often encounter talarðu as opposed to the expanded form talar þú. The actual change undergone here is the transformation of the voiceless dental fricative ⟨þ⟩ into the voiced dental fricative ⟨ð⟩. This elision rule applies to many verbs, some having their own special forms (for example vera, 'to be', has the form ertu).
