= Sigurgeir Sigurðsson =

The Right Reverend Sigurgeir Sigurðsson
- Bishop of Iceland
- Church: Church of Iceland
- Diocese: Iceland
- Elected: 29 November 1938
- In office: 1939–1953
- Predecessor: Jón Helgason
- Successor: Ásmundur Guðmundsson

Orders
- Ordination: 7 October 1917 by Jón Helgason
- Consecration: 25 June 1939 by Jón Helgason

Personal details
- Born: 3 August 1890 Eyrarbakki, Iceland
- Died: 13 October 1953 (aged 63) Reykjavík, Iceland
- Denomination: Lutheran
- Parents: Sigurður Eiríksson & Svanhildur Sigurðardóttir
- Spouse: Guðrún Pétursdóttir
- Education: University of Iceland

Sigurgeir Sigurðsson (3 August 1890 – 13 October 1953) was an Icelandic prelate who was Bishop of Iceland from 1939 to 1953 . He was the father of Bishop Pétur Sigurgeirsson, a later successor.

== Biography ==
Sigurgeir was born on August 3, 1890, in Eyrarbakki, Iceland. His parents were Sigurður Eiríksson and Svanhildur Sigurðardóttir. He was educated in Reykjavík in 1913 and graduated in theology from the University of Iceland in February 1917. From 1917 till 1918 he served as assistant to the Reverend Magnús Jónsson in Ísafjörður and was ordained priest on 7 October in Reykjavík Cathedral by Bishop Jón Helgason. In 1918 he became parish priest of Ísafjörður. He went to Denmark and Germany in 1928 to study. In the winter of 1937 and 1938 he travelled to London, Cambridge and Oxford.

Sigurgeir was elected Bishop of Iceland in 1938 and was consecrated bishop on June 25, 1939. He travelled extensively and represented Iceland at numerous meetings and assemblies around the world. He also received numerous awards for his work. His wife was Guðrún Pétursdóttir from Seltjarnarnes. He died on October 13, 1953.
