= Karl Sigurbjörnsson =

Icelandic Lutheran bishop (1947–2024)

The Right Reverend Karl Sigurbjörnsson Th.D.
- Bishop of Iceland
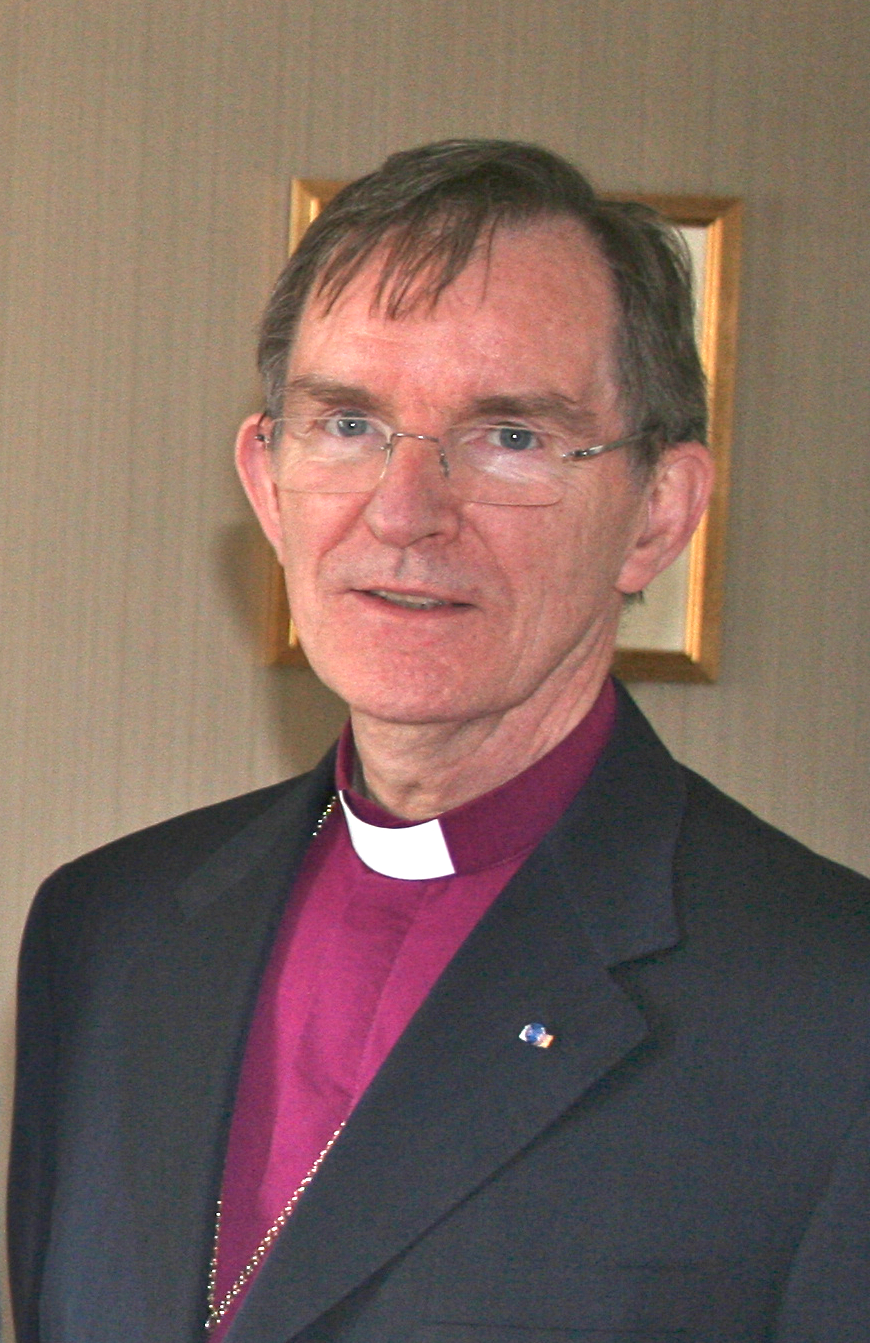
- Church: Church of Iceland
- Diocese: Iceland
- Elected: 6 September 1997
- In office: 1998–2012
- Predecessor: Ólafur Skúlason
- Successor: Agnes M. Sigurðardóttir

Orders
- Ordination: 29 January 1973 by Sigurbjörn Einarsson
- Consecration: 23 November 1997 by Ólafur Skúlason

Personal details
- Born: 5 February 1947 Reykjavík, Iceland
- Died: 12 February 2024 (aged 77)
- Denomination: Lutheran
- Parents: Sigurbjörn Einarsson & Magneur Thorkelsdóttir
- Spouse: Kristín Þórdís Guðjónsdóttir
- Children: 3
- Education: University of Iceland

Karl Sigurbjörnsson (5 February 1947 – 12 February 2024) was an Icelandic prelate who held the position of Bishop of Iceland of the national Evangelical Lutheran Church of Iceland from 1998 to 2012.

== Biography ==
Karl was the son of Sigurbjörn Einarsson, Bishop of Iceland between 1959 and 1981 and his wife Magnea Thorkelsdóttir. Between 1962 and 1964 he went as an exchange student to Tacoma, Washington, United States. He graduated from Reykjavík High School in 1967 and graduated in theology from the University of Iceland on 27 January 1973. He was ordained a priest on 29 January 1973. Between 1973 and 1975 he served as parish priest of the Landakirkja in Vestmannaeyjar. On 6 December 1974, he was appointed parish priest of Hallgrímskirkja in Reykjavík and was installed on 1 January 1975, a post he retained till 1997. He served a pastoral ministry in Sweden from 1977 to 1978, and studied in the United States from 1988 to 1989. On 6 September 1997 he was elected Bishop of Iceland and was consecrated on 23 November that year. He received an honorary doctorate from the Faculty of Theology on 8 September 2000.

== Personal life and death ==
Karl was the father of actor Guðjón Davíð Karlsson.

In 2018, Karl was diagnosed with cancer. He died on 12 February 2024, at the age of 77.
