= Hallgrímur Sveinsson =

Icelandic bishop

The Right Reverend Hallgrímur Sveinsson
- Bishop of Iceland
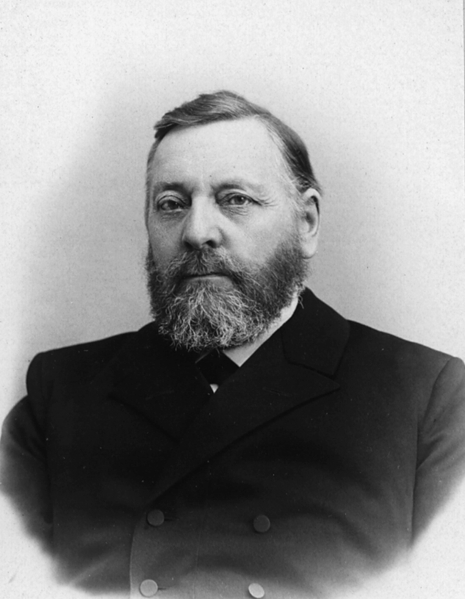
- Church: Church of Iceland
- Diocese: Iceland
- Appointed: 16 April 1889
- In office: 1889–1908
- Predecessor: Pétur Pétursson
- Successor: Þórhallur Bjarnarson

Orders
- Ordination: 8 October 1871
- Consecration: 25 May 1889 by Bruun Juul Fog

Personal details
- Born: 5 April 1841 Blöndudalshólar, Iceland
- Died: 16 December 1909 (aged 68)
- Denomination: Lutheran
- Parents: Sveinn Níelsson & Guðrún Jónsdóttir
- Spouse: Elina Marie Bolette Fevejle
- Children: 4

Hallgrímur Sveinsson (5 April 1841 – 16 December 1909) was an Icelandic prelate who serviced as Bishop of Iceland from 1889 till 1908.

== Biography ==
Hallgrímur was born on 5 April 1841 in Blöndudalshólar, Iceland, the son of Sveinn Níelsson, a member of parliament, and Guðrún Jónsdóttir. He graduated from the Reykjavik School in 1863 and from the University of Copenhagen in 1870. Between 1870 and 1871, he studied at the seminary in Copenhagen. In 1971 he joined and became a member of the Reykjavik Cathedral priests. That same year he also married Elina Marie Bolette Fevejle. They had four children, Friðrik, Guðrún, Sveinn and Ágústa. Between 1885-1887 and 1893-1905 he was a member of the Althing, the Icelandic parliament, for the Framfaraflokkurinn party and the old Framsóknarflokkurinn party. He served as speaker of the Althing from 1897 to 1899. On 16 April 1889 he was appointed Bishop of Iceland and was consecrated on 25 May in Copenhagen. He retired on 19 September 1908.
