= Steingrímur Jónsson =

Icelandic bishop (1769–1845)

The Right Reverend Steingrímur Jónsson
- Bishop of Iceland
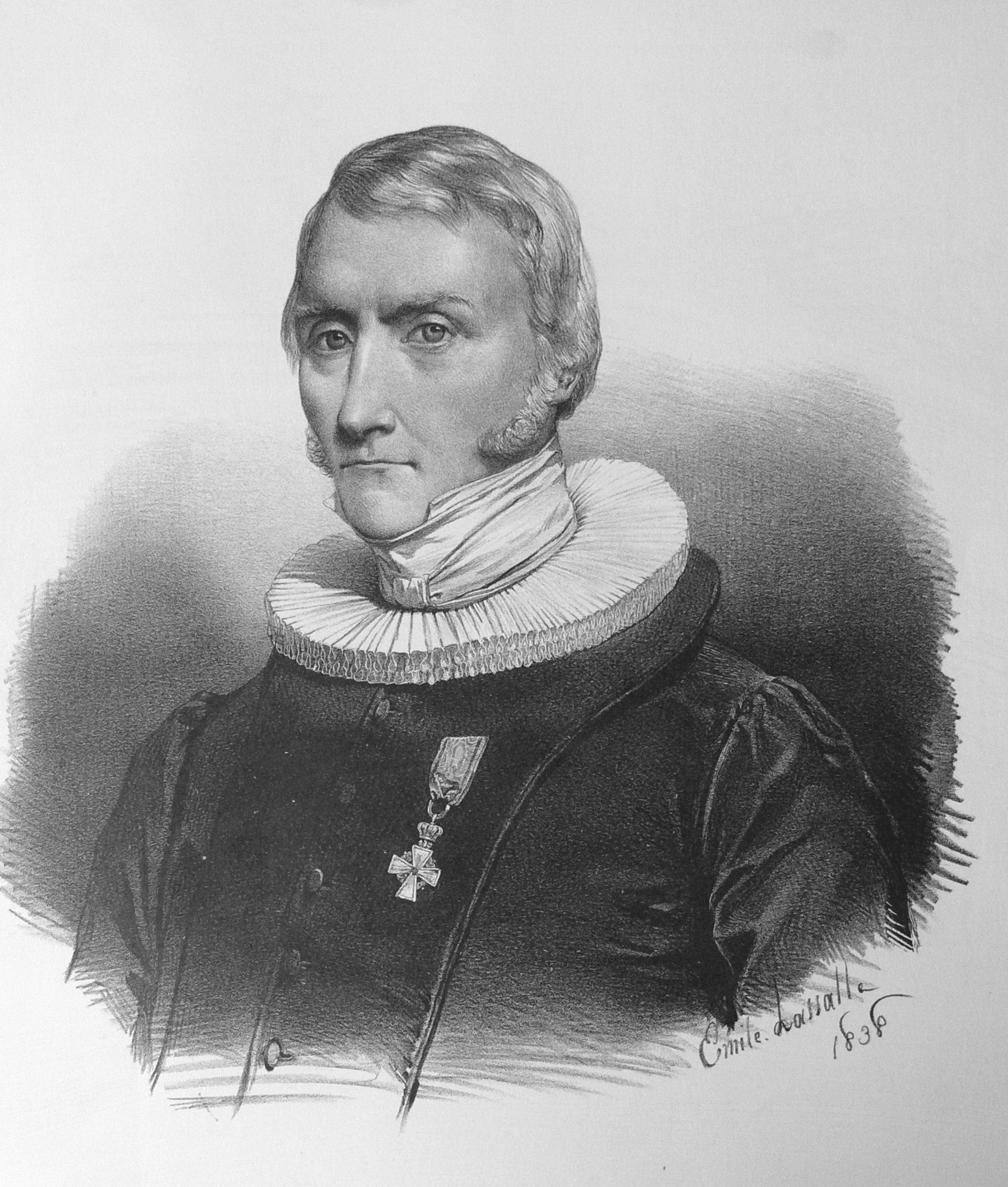
- Church: Church of Iceland
- Diocese: Iceland
- Appointed: 12 May 1824
- In office: 1824–1845
- Predecessor: Geir Vídalín
- Successor: Helgi G. Thordersen

Orders
- Consecration: 26 December 1824 by Frederik Münter

Personal details
- Born: 14 August 1769
- Died: 14 June 1845 (aged 75)
- Denomination: Lutheran
- Spouse: Valgerdi Jónsdóttir

Steingrímur Jónsson (14 August 1769 - 14 June 1845) was an Icelandic prelate who served as the second Bishop of Iceland from 1824 till 1845.

== Biography ==
He studied in the school of the Diocese of Skálholt and then in Reykjavík in 1788. He also studied theology in Copenhagen in 1803. He was appointed Bishop of Iceland on 12 May 1824, and he was consecrated by Bishop Frederik Münter of Zealand on 26 December 1824. In May 1825, he was installed as bishop.
