= Helgi G. Thordersen =

Icelandic politician and Bishop of Iceland

The Right Reverend Helgi G. Thordersen
- Bishop of Iceland
- Church: Church of Iceland
- Diocese: Iceland
- Appointed: 25 September 1845
- In office: 1846–1866
- Predecessor: Steingrímur Jónsson
- Successor: Pétur Pétursson

Orders
- Ordination: 6 April 1820
- Consecration: 5 July 1846 by Jacob Peter Mynster

Personal details
- Born: 8 April 1794 Reykjavík, Iceland
- Died: 4 December 1867 (aged 73)
- Denomination: Lutheran
- Parents: Guðmundur Þórðarson & Steinunn Helgadóttir
- Spouse: Ragneidur Stephensen

Helgi Guðmundsson Thordersen (8 April 1794 – 4 December 1867) was an Icelandic politician and prelate who served as Bishop of Iceland from 1846 till 1866.

== Biography ==
Thordersen graduated from the Latin school at Bessastaðir in 1813. He moved to Copenhagen in 1814 and graduated in theology in 1819. That same year, he returned to Iceland and taught children in Reykjavík the following winter. In 1820, he was ordained a priest in Hallgrímskirkja (Hvalfjörður). In 1836, he became a cathedral priest in Reykjavík and was bishop of Iceland from 1846 to 1866 as successor to Steingrímur Jónsson. He had no great importance in political life, but had a certain influence on the church legislative work during the first meetings, as well as in the relocation of the Latin school from Bessastaðir to Reykjavík and the establishment of the parsonage.
