= Geir Vídalín =

Icelandic theologian

The Right Reverend Geir Vídalín
- Bishop of Iceland
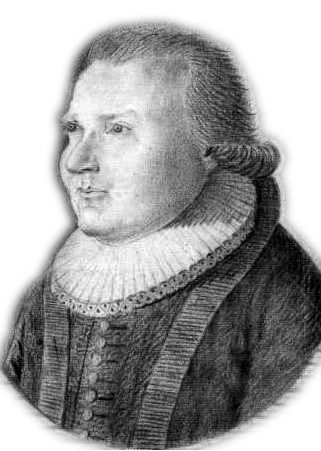
- Church: Church of Iceland
- Diocese: Iceland
- Appointed: November 1801
- In office: 1801–1823
- Successor: Steingrímur Jónsson
- Previous post: Bishop of Skálholt (1797-1801)

Orders
- Ordination: 8 January 1791
- Consecration: 30 July 1797 by Sigurður Stefánsson

Personal details
- Born: 27 October 1761 Laufás, Eyjafjörður, Iceland
- Died: 20 September 1823 (aged 61) Reykjavík, Iceland
- Denomination: Lutheran
- Parents: Jón Jónsson & Sigríður Magnúsdóttir
- Spouse: Sigríður Halldórsdóttir
- Children: 4

Geir Vídalín Jónsson (27 October 1761 – 20 September 1823) was an Icelandic prelate who was the last diocesan Bishop of Skálholt from 1797 till 1801 when he became the first Bishop of Iceland.

== Biography ==
Geir was the son of Jón Jónsson a priest in Laufás, and Sigríður Magnúsdóttir. He graduated from the University of Copenhagen in 1789 and became a cathedral priest in Reykjavík and lived in Lambastaðir at Seltjarnarnes. He was elected Bishop of Skálholt after the death of Hannes Finnsson in 1796. He was consecrated by the Bishop of Hólar Sigurður Stefánsson on 30 July 1797. He did, however, remain at Lambastaðir, planning to relocate the diocese to Reykjavík. After the death of Stefánsson, no new successor was appointed to Hólar and the two Icelandic dioceses were amalgamated into the united Diocese of Reykjavík in November 1801, with Geir Vídalín as the first bishop. Geir's wife was Sigríður Halldórsdóttir who died in 1846.
