= Guðrún Karls Helgudóttir =

Icelandic priest

The Right Reverend Guðrún Karls Helgudóttir
- Bishop of Iceland
- Church: Church of Iceland
- Diocese: Iceland
- Predecessor: Agnes M. Sigurðardóttir

Orders
- Ordination: January 11, 2004
- Consecration: September 1, 2024 by Agnes Sigurðardóttir

Personal details
- Born: 27 April 1969 (age 57)

Guðrún Karls Helgudóttir (born April 27, 1969), is an Icelandic priest. Guðrún won in the second round of the 2024 Bishop of Iceland election and received over 52% of the votes. She was inaugurated on September 1, 2024.

== Family and education ==
Guðrún Karls Helgudóttir was born in Reykjavík to parents Karl Magnús Kristjánsson and Helga Einarsdóttir. She completed her secondary education, graduating from Fjölbrautarskólan in Breiðholt in 1992. She pursued higher education at the University of Iceland, where she obtained a bachelor's degree in theology in the autumn of 1998. She continued her theological studies at the same university, completing them in 2000. From 1999 to 2000, she worked with children at a church in Árbær and with young people in the parishes of Akranes and Grafarvogur.

== Priesthood ==
Guðrún Karls Helgudóttir gained varied experience in the capital region, holding positions in churches such as Hjallakirkja in Kópavogur and in Seltjarnarnes. She also supervised confirmation classes for children in Skálholt and Gothenburg.

From 2001 to 2003, she served as an intern in the Lutheran Diocese of Gothenburg. Prior to this, she worked as a therapist at a shelter for women affected by violence in Gothenburg (2000–2001) and with young people at the Lundby Church (a suburb of Gothenburg). After studying at the seminary in Lund and completing professional training and a course in Swedish canon law, she was ordained on January 11, 2004. The ordination took place in the Gustavus Adolphus Cathedral, conducted by Bishop Carl Axel Aurelius.

In 2008, she became a priest in the parish of Grafarvogur (a district of Reykjavík), and has served as the parish priest there since 2016. During her tenure, she has been a notable advocate for the rights of LGBT people. She took a leave of absence in 2016 to pursue doctoral studies in homiletics at the Lutheran School of Theology in Chicago. She was also a member of the Church Synod from 2014 to 2022.

== Bishop of Iceland ==
Guðrún Karls Helgudóttir was elected the Bishop of Iceland in the second round of the 2024 elections, securing over 52.19% of the votes and defeating Guðmundur Karl Brynjarsson. She was ordained on September 1, 2024, at Hallgrímskirkja by the previous Bishop of Iceland, Agnes Sigurðardóttir. She became the second woman to serve as the head of the Church of Iceland.

== Personal life ==
Guðrún Karls Helgudóttir is married to Einar Ernur Sveinbjörnsson, a professor at the Department of Physics at the University of Iceland. She has two daughters, a son-in-law, and two granddaughters. One of her daughters is transgender. Bishop Guðrún Karls Helgudóttir is an amateur long-distance runner.

== See also ==
- Ordination of women

Titles in Lutheranism
Preceded by Agnes M. Sigurðardóttir	Bishop of Iceland; 1 September 2024–present	Incumbent
