= Olafur Skulason =

Olafur Skulason may refer to:

- Ólafur Skúlason, Icelandic bishop
- Ólafur Ingi Skúlason, Icelandic footballer
