= Jón Helgason (bishop) =

The Right Reverend Jón Helgason
- Bishop of Iceland
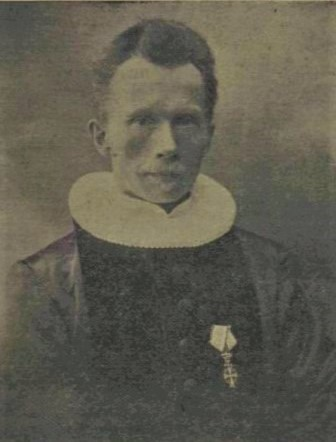
- Church: Church of Iceland
- Diocese: Iceland
- In office: 1917–1939
- Predecessor: Þórhallur Bjarnarson
- Successor: Sigurgeir Sigurðsson

Orders
- Consecration: 22 April 1917 by Valdimar Briem

Personal details
- Born: 21 June 1866 Álftanes, Iceland
- Died: 19 March 1942 (aged 75)
- Denomination: Lutheran
- Parents: Helgi Hálfdanarson and Þórhildur Tómasdóttir
- Spouse: Martha Marie
- Children: 5

Jón Helgason (21 June 1866 – 19 March 1942) was an Icelandic theologian who served as Bishop of Iceland from 1917 till 1939.

== Biography ==
Helgason was born in Álftanes on 21 June 1866, the son of the Reverend Helgi Hálfdanarson, later the rector of the Prestaskólinn (the Icelandic Seminary), and his wife Þórhildur Tómasdóttir. He came from a well-known family, including his grandfather Tómas Sæmundsson, a professor at Breiðabólstaður. Jón studied at the Reykjavik School between 1880 and 1886, then completed his degree and sailed the same summer in Copenhagen, where he completed various university degrees, including in Theology in 1892. He was taught in Reykjavík between 1892 and 1893, worked at a church in Denmark in 1893, completed two further examinations from the school in Höfn in 1894 and then travelled through Germany with a grant from the Danish government. There he learned about the German Bible and the publications of the prehistoric liberal theology.

In 1908 he was appointed director of the Prestaskóli. He was professor of theology at the University of Iceland 1911-1916, Dean of the Faculty of Theology for several years and the rector of the university between 1914 and 1915. Appointed Bishop of Iceland in 1916 and consecrated in 1917, and was granted an honorary doctorate in theology from the University of Copenhagen that same year and from the University of Iceland in 1936. He retired on 1 January 1939.

He wrote numerous books including:

- Uppruni Nýja testamentisins, 1904
- Almenn kristnisaga I-IV, 1912–30
- Grundvöllurinn er Kristur, 1915
- Þegar Reykjavík var 14 vetra, 1916
- Hirðisbréf, 1917
- Islands Kirke I-II, Kh. 1922-25
- Kristnisaga Íslands I-II, 1925–27
- Íslendingar í Danmörku, 1931
- Kristur vort líf, predikanir, 1932
- Meistari Hálfdan, 1935
- Hannes Finnsson biskup, 1936
- Jón Halldórsson í Hítardal, 1939
- Tómas Sæmundsson, 1941
- Þeir sem settu svip á bæinn, 1941
- Árbækur Reykjavíkur 1786-1936, 1941
