= Ásmundur =

Ásmundur is a masculine given name. Notable people with the name include:

- Ásmundur Ásgeirsson, Icelandic chess player
- Ásmundur Bjarnason (1927–2024), Icelandic sprinter
- Ásmundur Einar Daðason, Icelandic politician
- Ásmundur Friðriksson, Icelandic politician
- Ásmundur Guðmundsson, Icelandic prelate
- Asmundur Loptson, Icelandic-Canadian farmer and politician
- Ásmundur Sveinsson, Icelandic sculptor
