= Þórhallur Bjarnarson =

The Right Reverend Þórhallur Bjarnarson
- Bishop of Iceland
- Church: Church of Iceland
- Diocese: Iceland
- Appointed: 19 September 1908
- In office: 1908–1916
- Predecessor: Hallgrímur Sveinsson
- Successor: Jón Helgason

Orders
- Ordination: 18 March 1884
- Consecration: 4 October 1908 by Hallgrímur Sveinsson

Personal details
- Born: 2 December 1855 Laufás, Eyjafjörður, Iceland, Kingdom of Denmark
- Died: 15 December 1916 (aged 50)
- Denomination: Lutheran
- Parents: Björns Halldórsson & Sigríður Einarsdóttir
- Spouse: Valgerður Jónsdóttir
- Children: 4

Þórhallur Bjarnarson (2 December 1855 – 15 December 1916) was an Icelandic prelate and politician who served as a member of parliament between 1894 and 1899 and from 1902 to 1908. He was also the sixth Bishop of Iceland from 1908 until 1916.

== Biography ==
Bjarnarson was born in Laufás near Eyjafjörður, the son of the Reverend Björns Halldórsson and his wife Sigríður Einarsdóttir. He graduated from the School of Applied Sciences in 1877 and graduated with theology from the University of Copenhagen in 1883. He was ordained a priest on 18 March 1884 and was appointed pastor at Reykholt. That same year he was also appointed Dean of the Borgarfjarðar Deanery. On 19 March 1885 he was appointed pastor of Akureyri; however, on 28 August he became a lecturer at the Prestaskólar (Seminary) and later its director in 1894.

He was also the Member of Parliament for Borgarfjörður from 1894 to 1900 and from 1902 to 1908, first as an independent and then as a member of the Home Rule Party. He served as President of the Lower House between 1897 and 1899. He was also a member of the City Council of Reykjavik between 1888 and 1906.

On 19 September 1908 he was appointed Bishop of Iceland to succeed the retiring Hallgrímur Sveinsson. He was consecrated by Sveinsson on 4 October 1908. He served as bishop until his death.

== Family ==
Þórhallur lived longest in Laufás near Laufásvegur in Reykjavik. His wife was Valgerður Jónsdóttir (27 January 1863 – 23 January 1913). They had four children, including Tryggvi Þórhallsson who became Prime Minister of Iceland in 1927. His other three children were Svava, Björn and Dóra who married Ásgeir Ásgeirsson and who became President of Iceland in 1952.
