= Sigurbjörn Einarsson =

20th-century Icelandic Lutheran bishop

The Right Reverend Sigurbjörn Einarsson
- Bishop of Iceland
- Church: Church of Iceland
- Diocese: Iceland
- Elected: 29 April 1959
- In office: 1959–1981
- Retired: 1981
- Predecessor: Ásmundur Guðmundsson
- Successor: Pétur Sigurgeirsson

Orders
- Ordination: September 1938
- Consecration: 22 June 1959 by Ásmundur Guðmundsson

Personal details
- Born: 30 June 1911 Meðalland, Vestur-Skaftafellssýsla, Danish Iceland
- Died: 28 August 2008 (aged 97) Reykjavík, Iceland
- Buried: Fossvogskirkjugarður, Reykjavík, Iceland
- Denomination: Lutheran
- Parents: Einar Sigurfinnsson & Gíslrún Sigurbergsdóttir
- Spouse: Magnea Þorkelsdóttir
- Children: 8 including Þorkell Sigurbjörnsson, Karl Sigurbjörnsson
- Education: Uppsala University; Stockholm University; University of Iceland

Sigurbjörn Einarsson (30 June 1911 – 28 August 2008) was an Icelandic clergyman and theologian who served as the Bishop of Iceland (head of the Lutheran Church of Iceland) from 1959 to 1981.

== Early life and education ==
Sigurbjörn was born in Meðalland in Vestur-Skaftafellssýsla, where his father, Magnús Kristinn Einar Sigurfinnsson, was a farmer. His mother was Gíslrún Sigurbergsdóttir. After graduating in 1931 from Menntaskólinn í Reykjavík, he studied in Sweden, qualifying in Greek, Classical studies, and history at Uppsala University in 1936 and earning his cand. phil. from Stockholm University in 1937. In 1938, he received a doctorate in theology from the University of Iceland. He pursued postgraduate studies at Uppsala in New Testament studies in 1939, at Cambridge University in religious studies in summer 1945, and at various institutions including the University of Basel in winter 1947–48.

== Career ==
Ordained in September 1938, Sigurbjörn was parish priest at Breiðabólstaður in Snæfellsnes from 1938 to 1941, when he became the first priest of Hallgrímskirkja in Reykjavík (prior to the construction of the present church). From 1944 to 1959 he was on the theology faculty at the University of Iceland, becoming a professor in 1949. On 22 June 1959 he was consecrated as Bishop of Iceland by his predecessor, Ásmundur Guðmundsson; in September 1981 he was succeeded by Pétur Sigurgeirsson. He is credited with modernising the Church of Iceland, making it more ecumenical and international in outlook. He continued to preach and lead devotional activities in retirement.

== Publications ==
Sigurbjörn published numerous books, including textbooks on the history of religion and the psychology of religious life, an analysis of the Revelation of St. John, Trúarbrögð mannkyns, a second edition of which was published in 1978, a biography of Albert Schweitzer published in 1955, translations including hymns and the Confessions of St. Augustine, and a children's book titled Af hverju, afi. Several of his sermons have been anthologised. He was also a prominent writer of hymns. Sálmar og ljóð Sigrbjörns biskups was published in 1996 and Eigi stjörnum ofar – sálmar og ljóð posthumously in 2008.

== Honours and legacy ==
Sigurbjörn was awarded honorary doctorates in theology by the University of Iceland in 1961 and the University of Winnipeg in 1975. He was made an honorary member of the Association of Icelandic Clergy in 1978, the Association of Icelandic Writers in 1981, the Icelandic Bible Society in 1982, and the Clergy Association of Suðurland in 1987. He was awarded the Grand Knight's Cross of the Icelandic Order of the Falcon in June 1959, the Grand Knight's Cross with Star in January 1968, and the Grand Cross in June 1968.

In memory of Sigurbjörn, in 2008 the Church of Iceland instituted Stofnun dr. Sigurbjörns Einarssonar (The Icelandic Institute for Religion and Reconciliation).

== Personal life and death ==
Sigurbjörn was married to Magnea Þorkelsdóttir from 1933 until her death in 2006. They had eight children, among them Karl Sigurbjörnsson, who was also Bishop of Iceland, and Þorkell Sigurbjörnsson, a composer. He died in Landspítali in Reykjavík at the age of 97.
