= Pétur Sigurgeirsson =

The Right Reverend Pétur Sigurgeirsson
- Bishop of Iceland
- Church: Church of Iceland
- Diocese: Iceland
- Elected: 1 October 1981
- In office: 1981–1989
- Retired: 1 July 1989
- Predecessor: Sigurbjörn Einarsson
- Successor: Ólafur Skúlason
- Previous posts: Bishop of Hólar (1969-1981)

Orders
- Ordination: 1947
- Consecration: 11 August 1969 by Sigurbjörn Einarsson

Personal details
- Born: 2 June 1919 Ísafjörður, Kingdom of Iceland
- Died: 4 June 2010 (aged 91) Reykjavík, Iceland
- Denomination: Lutheran
- Parents: Sigurgeir Sigurdsson & Gudrún Pétursdóttir
- Spouse: Sólveig Ásgeirsdóttir
- Children: 4
- Education: University of Iceland

Pétur Sigurgeirsson (2 June 1919 – 4 June 2010) was the Bishop of Iceland from 1981 until 1989.

== Biography ==
Pétur was the son of Sigurgeir Sigurdsson who later became Bishop of Iceland and Gudrún Pétursdóttir. He had 3 other siblings and was the oldest amongst them. He graduated from Reykjavík University in 1940 and studied theology at the University of Iceland and graduated in 1944. He undertook a master's degree at the Lutheran Theological Seminary at Philadelphia in Philadelphia and studied journalism, English and Biblical Studies at Stanford University, California. In 1947, he was ordained priest and served in the parish of Akureyri. He became the Bishop of Hólar in 1969. On October 1, 1981 he was elected as Bishop of Iceland.
