= Ólafur Skúlason =

The Right Reverend Ólafur Skúlason
- Bishop of Iceland
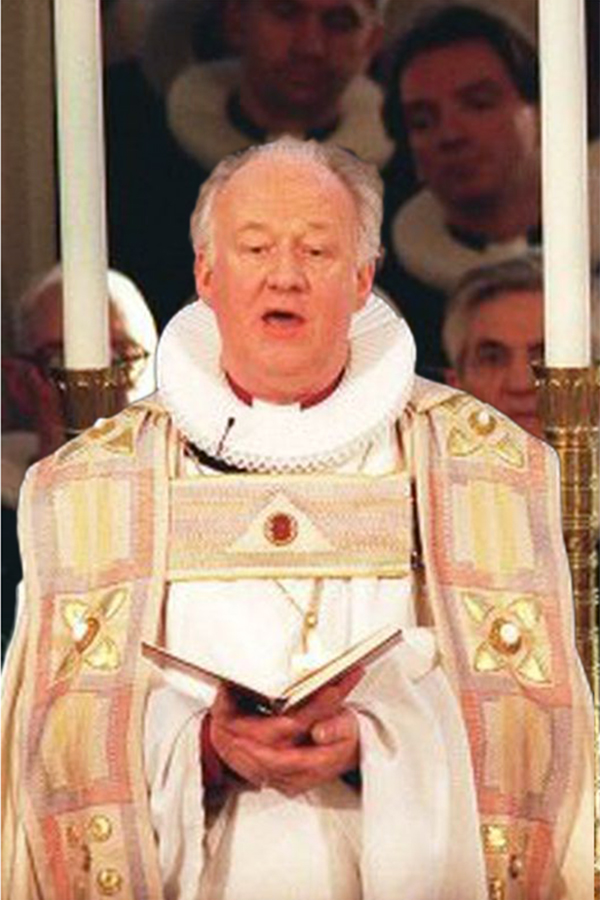
- Church: Church of Iceland
- Diocese: Iceland
- Elected: 1989
- In office: 1989–1997
- Predecessor: Pétur Sigurgeirsson
- Successor: Karl Sigurbjörnsson
- Previous post: Bishop of Skálholt (1983-1989)

Orders
- Ordination: 5 June 1955
- Consecration: 24 July 1983 by Pétur Sigurgeirsson

Personal details
- Born: 29 December 1929 Birtingaholt, Hrunamannahreppur, Kingdom of Iceland
- Died: 9 June 2008 (aged 78) Reykjavík, Iceland
- Denomination: Lutheran
- Parents: Skúli Oddleifsson & Sigríður Ágústsdóttir
- Spouse: Ebba Sigurðardóttir
- Children: 3
- Education: University of Iceland

Ólafur Skúlason (29 December 1929 – 9 June 2008) was an Icelandic prelate who was Bishop of Iceland from 1989 to 1997. Since 1996 he had been accused of sexually abusing many women, including his daughter.

== Biography ==
Ólafur was born in Birtingaholt in Hrunamannahreppur, Iceland, the son of Skúli Oddleifsson and Sigríður Ágústsdóttir. After graduating from the University of Iceland in 1955, he was ordained priest for service to the Icelandic congregation in Mountain, North Dakota. In 1960, he was appointed as the first youth representative of the National Church and in 1964 became pastor of Bústaðarkirkja in Reykjavík. In 1975 he was appointed a Dean in Reykjavík. In 1983 he was appointed and consecrated Bishop of Skálholt and suffragan to the Bishop of Iceland. In 1989 he was elected Bishop of Iceland.

His time as bishop saw a great transformation towards more independence for the National Church. The highlight of these changes was the law (on the status, government and practice of the National Church), where the Church was granted the right to decide on the issues that concerned it. At the time, he was also a board member of the Lutheran World Federation and chaired the administration of the Ecumenical Organisation in Strasbourg.

== Sexual abuse ==
During his tenure, a series of sexual abuse scandals related to priests, as well as accusations against Ólafur himself, started to come out, whereby he was accused of sexually abusing numerous women. At that time the scandals were kept in secrecy and dismissed by the church. However, after his death, in 2010 his daughter Guðrún Ebba Ólafsdóttir attended the Church Council and disclosed that Ólafur had sexually abused her for many years.
