= Ásmundur Guðmundsson =

Icelandic bishop

The Right Reverend Ásmundur Guðmundsson
- Bishop of Iceland
- Ásmundur Guðmundsson
- Church: Church of Iceland
- Diocese: Iceland
- In office: 1954–1959
- Predecessor: Sigurgeir Sigurðsson
- Successor: Sigurbjörn Einarsson

Orders
- Ordination: June 1915
- Consecration: 20 June 1954 by Bjarni Jónsson

Personal details
- Born: 6 October 1888 Reykholt, Danish Iceland
- Died: 29 May 1969 (aged 80) Akranes, Iceland
- Buried: Hólavallakirkjugarður, Reykjavík
- Denomination: Lutheran
- Parents: Guðmundur Helgason & Þóra Ásmundsdóttir
- Spouse: Steinunn Sigríður Magnúsdóttir
- Children: 7
- Education: University of Iceland

Ásmundur Guðmundsson (6 October 1888 - 29 May 1969) was an Icelandic prelate who was Bishop of Iceland from 1954 till 1959.

== Biography ==
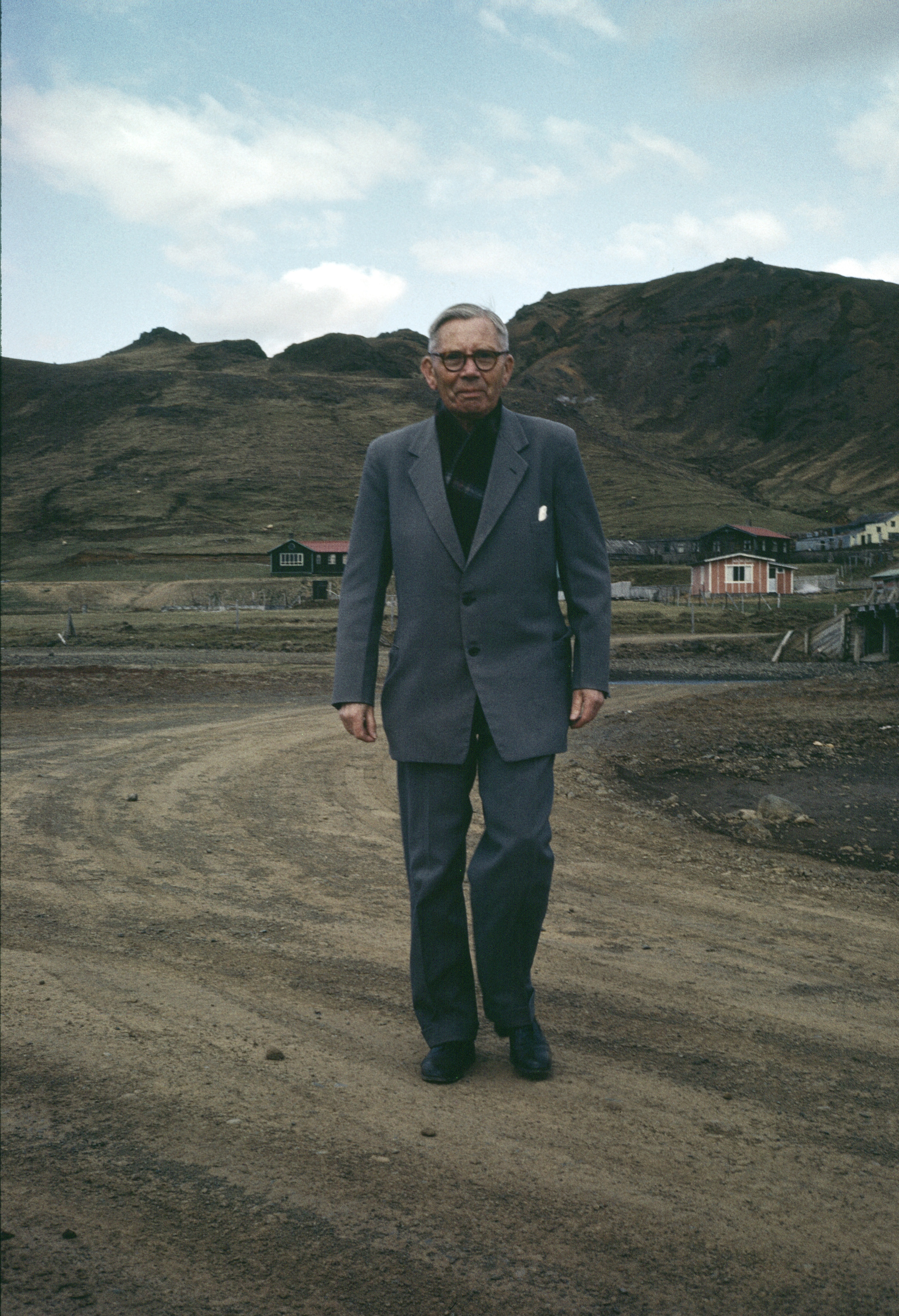
Ásmundur Guðmundsson around 1963

Guðmundsson was born on 6 October 1888 in Reykholt, Iceland. He graduated from the University of Iceland on 19 June 1912. He served as pastor to the Icelandic settlements in Alberta for a month in 1914 and in Saskatchewan in Canada from 1912 till 1914. He became an assistant priest in Stykkishólmur on 24 June 1915 and became parish priest on Helgafell on 31 May 1916. Appointed principal of Eiðar on 11 January 1919 and Associate Professor at the Faculty of Theology at the University of Iceland on 24 April 1928 and Professor on 24 April 1934. He was also Dean of the Theological Department from 1934 till 1935. He was elected Bishop of Iceland in 1954 and was consecrated bishop in Reykjavík Cathedral on 20 June 1954. In 1959 he was succeeded by Sigurbjörn Einarsson. Ásmundur Guðmundsson wrote a number of books, including The Supreme Life (1964) about Jesus' life.
