= Weak noun =

Nouns that follow weak inflection

Weak nouns are nouns that follow a weak inflection paradigm, in contrast with strong nouns. They are present in several Germanic languages.

== English ==
Modern English has only two vestiges of the weak noun inflection in common use: ox, whose plural is oxen, and child, whose plural is children, the latter being a double plural. Additionally, the words aurochs and brother have the optional plural forms aurochsen and brethren, the latter also being a double plural. The word men is not an example of the weak inflection, since it was produced by i-mutation of man.

Old English had many more weak nouns, such as ēage "eye" (plural ēagan) and draca "dragon" (plural dracan), but these have all either disappeared or become strong nouns.

== German ==
In German, weak nouns are masculine nouns that all have the same inflection except in the nominative singular and sometimes the genitive singular.

Namen "Name"
	Singular	Plural
Nominative	der Name	die Namen
Accusative	den Namen	die Namen
Dative	dem Namen	den Namen
Genitive	des Namens	der Namen

German has many more weak nouns than English; for example, Bär (pl. Bären) "bear", Name (pl. Namen) "name", Held (pl. Helden) "hero".

Some nouns such as the neuter noun Auge (pl. Augen) have a mixed inflection, being strong in the singular but having the characteristic -en plural ending of a weak noun. Some nouns can be declined either with this mixed paradigm or as fully weak; for example, Nachbar "neighbor" may be declined strong in the singular, though its plural is always weak (Nachbarn).

Some weak nouns have a strong inflection in colloquial speech. For example, the standard accusative of Bär is Bären, but the strong inflection Bär may also be heard.

== Icelandic ==
In the Icelandic language, nouns are considered weak if they fulfill the following conditions:

Masculines:

The nominative singular ends in -i, the other singular cases end in -a or -ja.
The noun is derived from the present participle of a verb, in which case the plural ends in -ur (but the singular follows the -i-a rule).

An example of the latter is nemandi (student), plural nemendur. The words bóndi (farmer) and fjandi (enemy or the devil or a demon) belong to this class with some irregularities. The plural of bóndi is bændur. Fjandi has two plurals, depending on the meaning. If it means an enemy, the plural is fjendur (note the retention of je). If it means a demon, the plural is fjandar.

Exceptions do exist, for instance Grikki (Greek), plural Grikkir. The same applies to Tyrki (Turk) plural Tyrkir. Both, incidentally, end in -ja in the oblique cases (Grikkja is the accusative, dative and genitive for one Greek).

Feminines:

The nominative singular ends in -a, the other singular cases end in -u.
The singular ends in -i in all cases. (If there is a plural, it may end in either -ir or -ar.)

Neuters:

They end in -a in the singular in all cases. The plural ends in -u (but the genitive plural in -na) without further alterations with the exception of hjarta (heart) which becomes hjörtu in the plural through u-umlaut. The genitive plural, however is hjartna showing a-breaking instead of u-breaking. Some borrowings may exhibit similar behaviour, e.g., singular drama, plural drömu. Most of these are words for organs.

An almost exhaustive list of neuter weak nouns follows:

- auga (eye)
- bjúga (a type of sausage)
- eista (testicle)
- eyra (ear)
- hjarta (heart)
- hnoða (a woollen ball, most often encountered in fairy-tales)
- lunga (lung)
- milta (spleen)
- nýra (kidney)

Then there are a small number of borrowings like firma, drama, þema etc. none of which require translation.

== See also ==
- Strong noun
- Icelandic language
