= Strong noun =

A strong noun is a phenomenon of more conservative Germanic languages like Icelandic, and also of Irish, marked in each by case or number markings.

== Icelandic ==
In the Icelandic language, a strong noun is one that falls into one of four categories, depending on the endings of the characteristic cases, i.e. the nominative and genitive singular and the nominative plural. For masculines this gives the following four-way split to be counted as strong:

The latter two cases end in -s and -ar.
The latter two cases end in -s or -ar and -ir.
The latter two cases end in -ar and -ir.
Irregular but not a weak noun.

For feminines this looks like:

The latter two cases end in -ar or -r and -ar.
The latter two cases end in -ar and -ir.
The latter two cases end in -ar or -ur and -ur or -r.
Irregular but not a weak noun.

Most neuters are strong, and end in -s in the genitive singular with the exception of fé, genitive fjár. Although strong neuters technically only belong to one category, it is a diverse group, so about a dozen paradigms are necessary to account for varieties and exceptions.

The weak neuters are so few, that a list suffices, to be found on the page for weak nouns.

== Irish ==
In the Irish language, a strong noun is one in which a noun maintains the same form of the plural in all cases, especially both the nominative and genitive plurals.

The strong-noun endings are -(a)í, -ta/-te, -the, -(e)acha, and (e)anna. Certain other nouns that take plain -a or -e may be strong if the nominative and genitive plural are the same. All nouns ending in vowels in Irish are considered strong.

== See also ==
- Weak noun
- Icelandic language
- Irish language

== Bibliography ==
- Björn Guðfinnsson (1958). Íslensk málfræði Námsgagnastofnun.
