= Agnes M. Sigurðardóttir =

Icelandic prelate (born 1954)

The Right Reverend Agnes M. Sigurðardóttir
- Bishop of Iceland
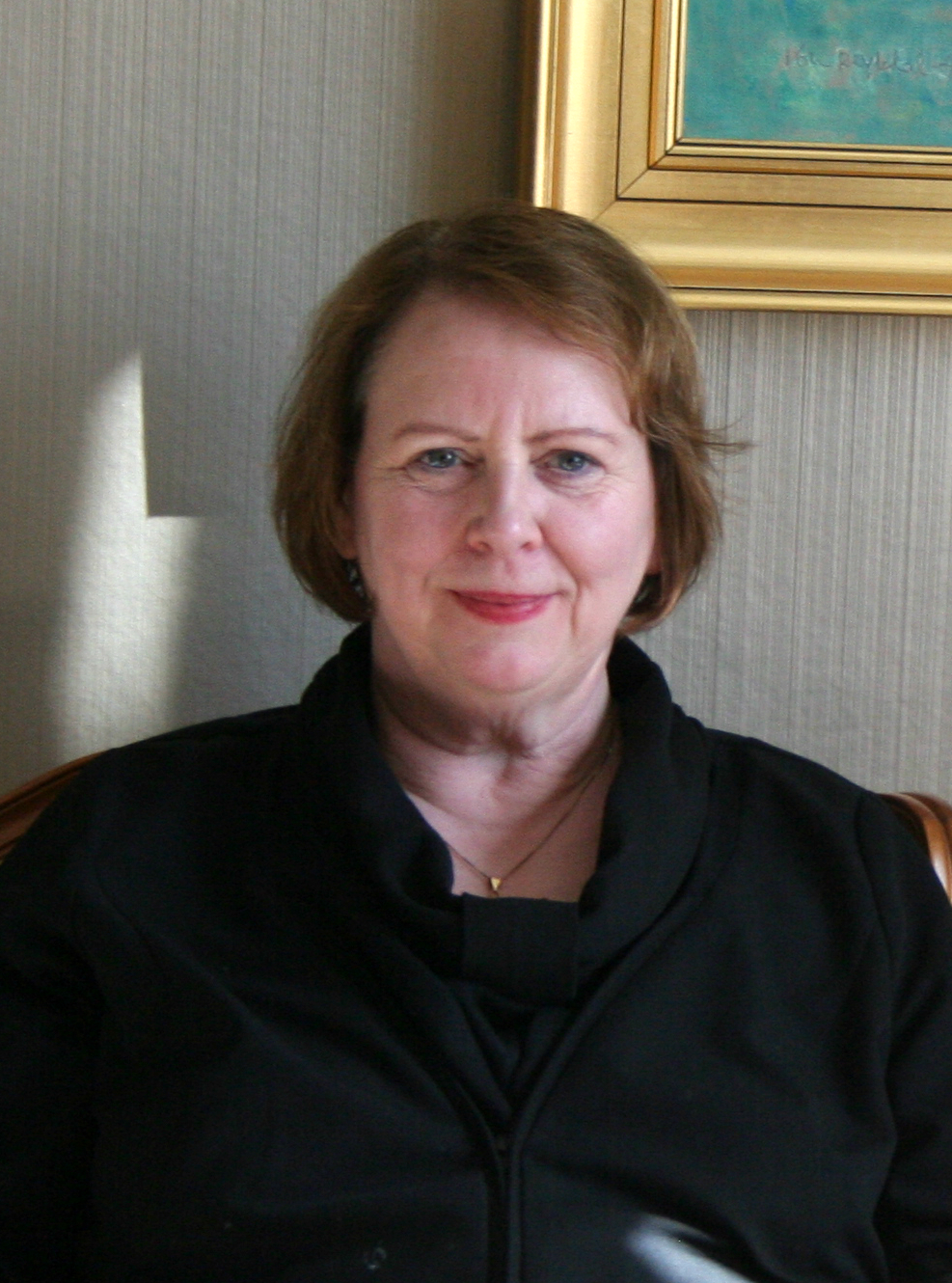
- Agnes in 2012
- Church: Church of Iceland
- Diocese: Iceland
- Predecessor: Karl Sigurbjörnsson
- Previous post: Dean of the Western Fjords

Orders
- Ordination: 20 September 1981
- Consecration: 24 June 2012 by Karl Sigurbjörnsson

Personal details
- Born: 19 October 1954 (age 72) Ísafjörður, Iceland

Ordination history of Agnes M. Sigurðardóttir
History
Episcopal consecration
- Principal consecrator: Karl Sigurbjörnsson
- Co-consecrators: Anders Wejryd; Michael Jackson; Kristján Valur Ingólfsson; Peter Skov-Jakobsen; David Chillingworth; Kari Mäkinen; Sofie Petersen

Agnes Margrétardóttir Sigurðardóttir (born 19 October 1954) is an Icelandic prelate who was the Bishop of Iceland from 2012 to 2024. She is the first woman to be elected a Bishop of the Church of Iceland, which happened in 2012; she took office as such in the same year.

== Biography ==
Agnes was born in Ísafjörður. She has the degree of Cand. theol., University of Iceland (1981). From 1999 and before her election, she served as the dean of the Western Fjords.

Agnes is divorced and has three children. She has been active in Iceland's music life, playing the piano and organ and singing in choirs.
