= Bishop of Iceland =

Leader of Iceland's Lutheran clergy

- Bishopric

Lutheran
- Incumbent; Guðrún Karls Helgudóttir

Information
- First holder: Geir Vídalín
- Established: 1801
- Diocese: Diocese of Iceland
- Cathedral: Reykjavík Cathedral

Website
- Website of the Diocese

The following is a list of Evangelical Lutheran bishops of Iceland. The first bishop of Iceland was Geir Vídalín who took office in 1801. As of 2024, 15 people have held the office of Bishop of Iceland.

== List ==
| No. | Bishop | Entered office | Left office |
|---|---|---|---|
| 1 | Geir Vídalín (1761–1823) | 1801 | 1823 |
| 2 | Steingrímur Jónsson (1769-1845) | 1824 | 1845 |
| 3 | Helgi G. Thordersen (1794–1867) | 1846 | 1866 |
| 4 | Pétur Pétursson (1808–1891) | 1866 | 1889 |
| 5 | Hallgrímur Sveinsson (1841–1909) | 1889 | 1908 |
| 6 | Þórhallur Bjarnarson (1855–1916) | 1908 | 1916 |
| 7 | Jón Helgason (1866–1942) | 1917 | 1939 |
| 8 | Sigurgeir Sigurðsson (1890–1953) | 1939 | 1953 |
| 9 | Ásmundur Guðmundsson (1888–1969) | 1954 | 1959 |
| 10 | Sigurbjörn Einarsson (1911–2008) | 1959 | 1981 |
| 11 | Pétur Sigurgeirsson (1919–2010) | 1981 | 1989 |
| 12 | Ólafur Skúlason (1929–2008) | 1989 | 1997 |
| 13 | Karl Sigurbjörnsson (1947–2024) | 1998 | 2012 |
| 14 | Agnes M. Sigurðardóttir (1954–) | 2012 | 2024 |
| 15 | Guðrún Karls Helgudóttir (1969–) | 2024 | Incumbent |

== See also ==
- List of Skálholt bishops
- List of Hólar bishops
