= Church of Iceland =

National church of Iceland

Evangelical Lutheran Church of Iceland
- Type: National church
- Classification: Christian
- Orientation: Lutheran
- Scripture: Bible
- Theology: Lutheran
- Polity: Episcopal
- Governance: General Synod
- Bishop of Iceland: Guðrún Karls Helgudóttir
- Associations: Lutheran World Federation, World Council of Churches, Conference of European Churches, Communion of Protestant Churches in Europe, Porvoo Communion
- Full communion: Lutheran World Federation
- Region: Iceland
- Headquarters: Reykjavík, Iceland
- Origin: 1540
- Separated from: Church of Denmark
- Members: 222,888 (2025)
- Publications: Kirkjuhúsið
- Official website: kirkjan.is (in Icelandic)

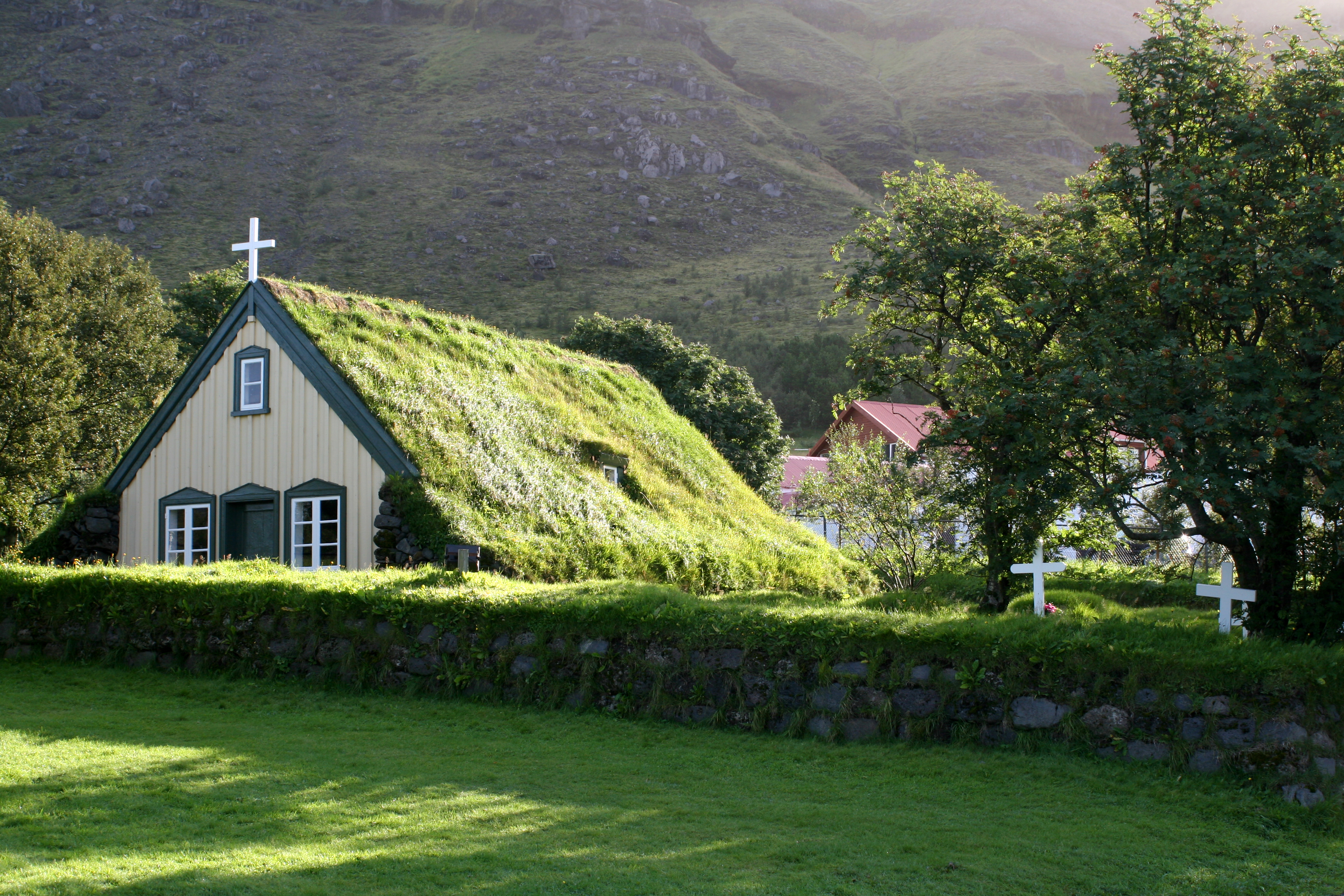
A small wood and turf church in Hof, Iceland

The Church of Iceland (Icelandic: Þjóðkirkjan, lit. 'The National Church'), officially the Evangelical Lutheran Church of Iceland (hin evangelíska lúterska kirkja), is the national church of Iceland. The church is Christian and professes the Lutheran faith. It is a member of the Lutheran World Federation, the Porvoo Communion, the Communion of Protestant Churches in Europe, and the World Council of Churches.

The church is organised as a single diocese headed by the Bishop of Iceland. The first woman to hold this position was Agnes M. Sigurðardóttir, appointed in 2012. She was succeeded by Guðrún Karls Helgudóttir in 2024. The church has two suffragan sees, Skálholt and Hólar, whose bishops are suffragans or assistant bishops to the Bishop of Iceland; unusually, each has a cathedral church despite not being in a separate diocese.

== History ==
The church has historical connections with the other Nordic churches including the Church of Sweden, Church of Norway, Church of Finland, and its former parent church, the Church of Denmark. All Nordic state churches are of the Lutheran Christian tradition.

== See also ==
- Church of Denmark
- Church of the Faroe Islands
- Evangelical Lutheran Church of Finland
- Church of Norway
- Church of Sweden
