= Bible translations into Icelandic =

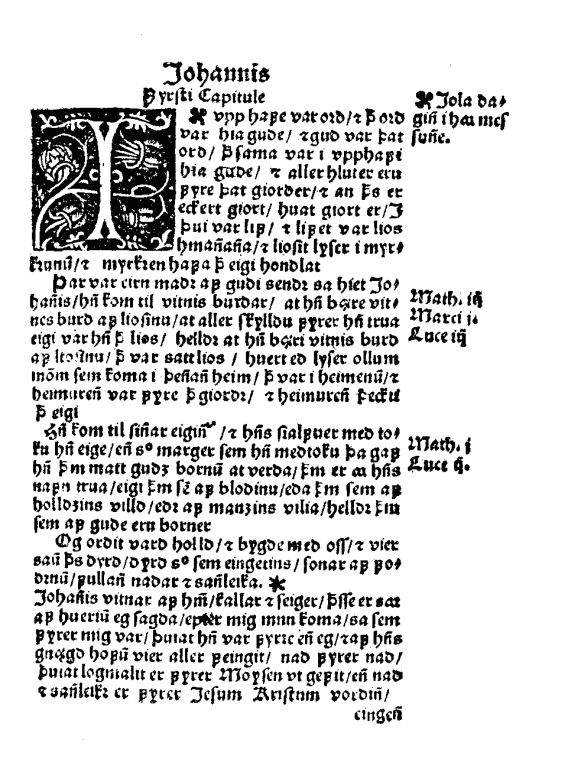
Beginning of the Gospel of John from Oddur Gottskálksson's 1540 translation of the New Testament into Icelandic

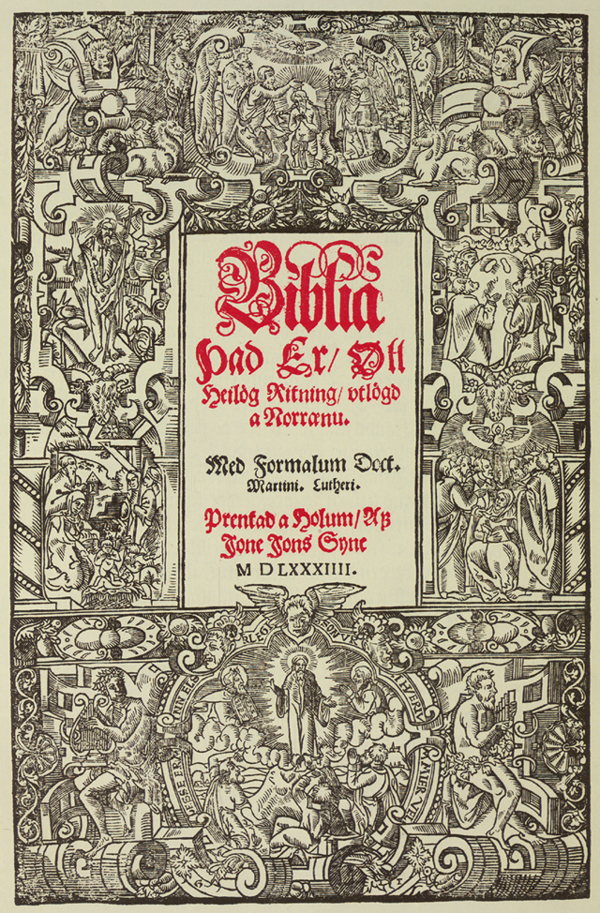
Title page of the elaborate printed bible of Guðbrandur Þorláksson, bishop, Hólar, 1584

The history of Bible translations into Icelandic began with the country's conversion to Christianity around 1000 CE but efforts accelerated with the Icelandic Reformation in the mid-16th century. Since then, 11 complete translations of the Bible have been completed into Icelandic. Currently, the Icelandic Bible Society oversees translation and production of Icelandic-language Bibles with the most recent full translation completed in 2007.

== Pre-Reformation ==
With the Christianization of Iceland, so-called þýðingar helgar (sacred translations) were written in Old Norse/Old Icelandic to help explain the new religion and practices to the populace. These included religious interpretations alongside translations of Bible stories. The oldest Icelandic biblical texts date to c. 1200 when the Old Icelandic Homily Book, which compiled sermons, lessons, and prayers. During the following century, more systematic efforts were made to translate sections of the Bible, eventually being collected into the Stjórn around 1350.

By the early 16th century, the only Icelandic translation available was Catholic Bishop Jón Arason's translations of the four Gospels, although copies of this work have not survived.

== Post-Reformation ==
When the Reformation reached Iceland in the mid-16th century, a full translation of the Bible into Icelandic was needed. This work began with a translation of the New Testament by Oddur Gottskálksson published in Roskilde in 1540 (text here). Oddur's translation followed the Latin Vulgate with reference to Martin Luther's 1552 German translation.

Guðbrandur Þorláksson, the Protestant bishop at Hólar, published the first complete translation, the Guðbrandsbiblía, in 1584. Guðbrandur's Old Testament translation was based on Luther's 1534 full German translation and Christian III's 1550 Danish translation. The New Testament used Oddur's translation with corrections. It is believed that Oddur translated the Psalms and Gissur Einarsson translated the Book of Proverbs and Book of Sirach. It is possible Guðbrandur himself translated other books of the Old Testament.

Afterwards, a number of other translations followed, such the 1644 Þorláksbiblía overseen by Bishop Þorlákur Skúlason and printer Halldór Ásmundsson in Hólar and the 1747 Waysenhússbiblía printed by Det Kongelige Vajsenhus in Copenhagen. In 1813, in the same city, the British Bible Society published the Grútarbiblía (or Hendersonsbiblía), just two years before the founding of the Icelandic Bible Society by the British Bible Society's Ebenezer Henderson.

A new translation, the Viðeyjarbiblía, was released in 1841 and revised in 1863 by Pétur Pétursson and Sigurður Melsteð, who compared it with the Greek and Hebrew originals and with the Norwegian, Danish, English and French versions. This edition (just the New Testament and Psalms) was edited by Eiríkur Magnússon and reprinted in 1866 in two editions: a single volume with the New Testament and Psalms and a set with the full Old and New Testaments. Both the 1863 and 1866 editions were printed by the British Bible Society at Oxford. These translations were used for the 1903 illustrated New Testament of the Scripture Gift Mission (London & Akureyri). By 1906, the British Bible Society was printing in Reykjavík a new New Testament translation based on the original texts by Haraldur Níelsson and, in 1908, the entire Bible.

The current publisher of the Icelandic Bible is the Icelandic Bible Society, which was founded on 10 July 1815 with the goal of making the Bible widely available and accessible in Iceland. In 1859 it printed the so-called Reykjavíkurbiblía, essentially the Viðeyjarbiblía from 18 years earlier. By 1899, the society was printing the Old Testament translations of Þórir Kr. Þórðarson, which were used into the early 21st century. The latest full translation, a new complete translation by Guðrún Guðlaugsdóttir, was published in 2007.

== List of translations ==
In total, 11 Icelandic versions of the Bible have been published with revisions made with each new version.

Translations of the full Bible:

- Guðbrandsbiblía, Hólar 1584
- Þorláksbiblía, Hólar 1637–1644
- Steinsbiblía, Hólar 1728 (1734)
- Waysenhússbiblía, Copenhagen 1747
- Grútarbiblía, (Hendersonsbiblía), Copenhagen 1813
- Viðeyjarbiblía, Viðey 1841
- Reykjavíkurbiblía, Reykjavík 1859
- Lundúnabiblía, London 1866
- Biblía 20. aldar, 1908-1912 Reykjavík (reprinted)
- Biblían 1981, Reykjavík 1981
- Biblía 21. aldar, Reykjavík 2007

New Testament translations include:

- Nýja testamenti Odds Gottskálkssonar Roskilde, Denmark 1540
- Nýja testamenti Guðbrands, Hólar 1609
- Waysenhúss-Nýja testamenti, Copenhagen 1746 and 1750
- Nýja testamenti, Copenhagen 1807
- Nýja testamentið, Viðey 1825 and 1827
- Nýja testamentið, Reykjavík 1851
- Nýja testamentið, Oxford 1863 and 1866
- Nýja testamentið, Akureyri and London 1903
- Nýja testamentið (Ný Þýðing), Reykjavík 1906 and 1914 (reprinted)

== Comparison of text ==
Translation	John 3:16
Hið Nýa Testament Jesu Christi (Oddur Gottskálksson, 1540)	Því að svo elskaði Guð heiminn að hann gaf út sinn eingetinn son til þess að allir þeir á hann trúa fyrirfærust eigi, heldur að þeir hafi eilíft líf.
Lundúnabiblían (Pétur Pétursson & Sigurður Melsteð, 1863/1866)	Því svo elskaði Guð heiminn, að hann gaf sinn eingetinn Son, til þess að hver, sem á hann trúir, ekki glatist, heldur hafi eilift lif.
Nýja Testamentið (Ný Þýðing) (Haraldur Níelsson & Brezka Biblíufélag, 1906)	Því að svo elskaði Guð heiminn, að hann gaf son sinn eingetinn, til þess að hver sem á hann trúir glatist ekki, heldur hafi eilíft líf.
Biblía 21. aldar (Guðrún Guðlaugsdóttir, 2007)	Því svo elskaði Guð heiminn að hann gaf einkason sinn til þess að hver sem á hann trúir glatist ekki heldur hafi eilíft líf.
