= Guðbrandsbiblía =

First translation of the Bible in Icelandic language (1584)

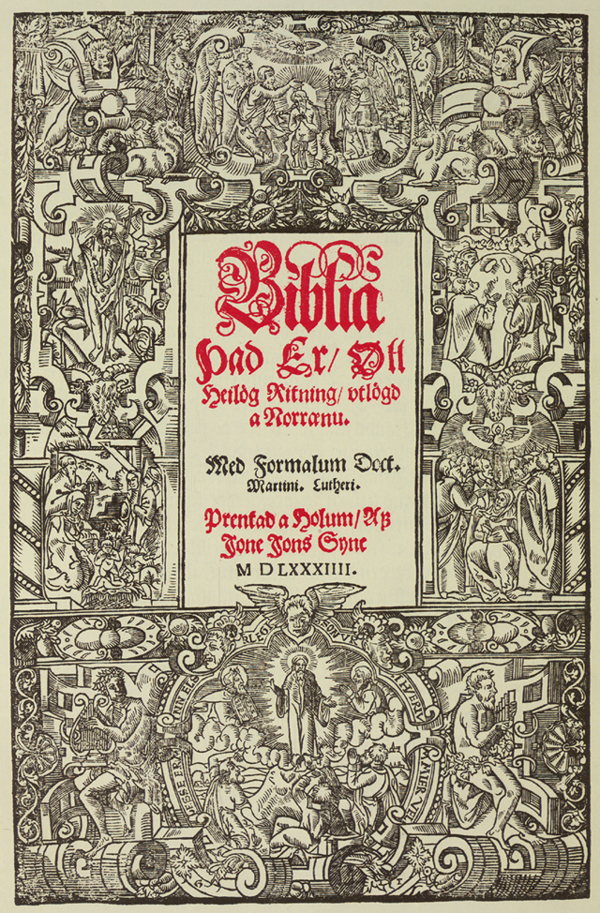
- Genesis 1:1–3 Í upphafi skapaði Guð himin og jörð. Og jörðin var eyði og tóm og myrkur var yfir undirdjúpinu. Og Guðs andi færðist yfir vötnin. Og Guð sagði: „Verði ljós!“ Og þar varð ljós. John 3:16 Svo elskaði Guð heiminn að hann gaf út sinn eingetinn son til þess að allir þeir sem á hann trúa fyrirfarist eigi heldur að þeir hafi eilíft líf.

The Guðbrand's Bible (Guðbrandsbiblía [ˈkvʏðˌpran(t)sˌpɪpliːa]; full title: Biblia þad er Øll heilog ritning, vtlögd a norrænu. Med formalum doct. Martini Lutheri. Prentad a Holum/Af Jone Jons Syne) was the first translation of the full Bible into the Icelandic language.

The translation was published in 1584 by Guðbrandur Þorláksson, Lutheran bishop of Hólar. The Old Testament translation was based on Martin Luther's 1534 full German translation and Christian III's 1550 Danish translation. The New Testament used Oddur Gottskálksson's 1540 translation with corrections. It is believed that Oddur translated the Psalms and Gissur Einarsson translated the Book of Proverbs and Book of Sirach. It is possible Guðbrandur himself translated other books of the Old Testament.
