= Eggert Hannesson =

Icelandic lawspeaker (1515–1583)

Eggert Hannesson (?1515-83) was a hirðstjóri (seniormost position under the king in the island) and lawspeaker and lived in Saurbæ, otherwise known as Bær á Rauðasandi, a major farm in Barðastrandarsýsla.

Eggert was the son of leading Westfjorders: Hannes Eggertsson, the hirðstjóri in Núpur in Dýrafjörður, who was apparently of Norwegian descent, and his wife Guðrún, a daughter of Björn Guðnason, a sýslumaður in Ögur. Eggert had a sister, Katrín, who married Bishop Gissur Einarsson, the first Lutheran bishop in Iceland.

In his youth, Eggert served Ögmundur Pálsson, Bishop of Skálholt, and would have gone with him to Germany and Norway on his missions in the years 1538–39. Later, he was in the service of Gissur Einarsson and went with him when we went abroad for consecration in Copenhagen in 1542. He was sýslumaður in the Westfjords in 1544 and lived at first at Núpur. He was hirðstjóri 1551-53 and Lawspeaker for the south and east until 1556, and for the north and west 1556–68, after which he was a sýslumaður and steward of the land of Helgafellsklaustur.

Eggert was the richest man in Iceland of his time, and indeed the most powerful. Among his manuscripts was the celebrated Eggertsbók (Reykjavík, Stofnun Árna Magnússonar, AM 556a-b 4to), which contains the earliest surviving text of Gísla saga. On one occasion while Eggert lived at Saurbær, he was seized by English pirates and held for a whole month on board their ship until a high ransom was paid. In 1580 Eggert moved to Hamburg, where he died.

Eggert's first wife was Sesselja Jónsdóttir; he later married Steinunn Jónsdóttir. His children were Björn, died accidentally from gunfire, Thorleif, lost at sea, & Jón murti, found guilty of murder or manslaying and fled the country to Hamborg where he spent his life and had descendants.

Preceded by Otte Stigsen Hvide	Hirðstjóri; 1551-1553	Succeeded by Poul Huitfeldt
Preceded by Erlendur Þorvarðarson	Lögmaður sunnan og austan 1553-1555	Succeeded by Páll Vigfússon
Preceded by Oddur Gottskálksson	Lögmaður norðan og vestan 1556-1568	Succeeded by Ormur Sturluson
