= Ögmundur =

Ögmundur is an Icelandic masculine given name. Its variant is Øgmundur. Notable people with the name are as follows:

- Ögmundur Jónasson (born 1948), Icelandic politician
- Ögmundur Kristinsson, multiple people
- Ögmundur Pálsson (c. 1475–1541), Icelandic Roman Catholic prelate
