= Hannesson =

Hannesson is an Icelandic patronymic, literally meaning "son of Hannes". Notable people with the name include:

- Eggert Hannesson, 16th-century Icelandic hirðstjóri and lawspeaker
- Guðbjartur Hannesson (1950–2015), Icelandic politician
- Hannes Marino Hannesson (1884–1958), Canadian politician
- Pálmi Hannesson (1898–1956), Icelandic naturalist and rector of Menntaskólinn í Reykjavík
