= Amy Johnston (medievalist) =

English medievalist (d. 1925)

Amy Johnston (née Leslie, d. 1925) was a British medievalist specialising in the history of the Northern Isles who served on the board of the Viking Society for Northern Research for 23 years.

A member of the Viking Society since 1894, Amy Leslie served as its Hon. Convener in 1901–4, Hon. Secretary in 1904–24, and Hon. Editor of Saga-Book and Year Book 1914–25. In 1902 she portrayed Auðr Vésteinsdóttir in a Society reading of Gísla saga.

In September 1905 she married architect Alfred Wintle Johnston. She and her husband were editors of the Society’s series Old-Lore Miscellany, producing eight volumes between 1907 and 1920. They also edited short series of Orkney and Shetland Records and Caithness and Sunderland Records.

Amy died in 1925.
