= Grettis saga =

Icelandic saga

Grettis saga Ásmundarsonar (modern Icelandic pronunciation: [ˈkrɛhtɪs ˈsaːɣa ˈauːsˌmʏntarˌsɔːnar̥], reconstructed Old Norse pronunciation: [ˈɡrɛtːɪs ˈsaɣa ˈɒːsˌmʊndarˌsɔnar]), also known as Grettla, Grettir's Saga or The Saga of Grettir the Strong, is one of the Icelanders' sagas. It details the life of Grettir Ásmundarson, a bellicose Icelandic outlaw, and is set in the eleventh century.

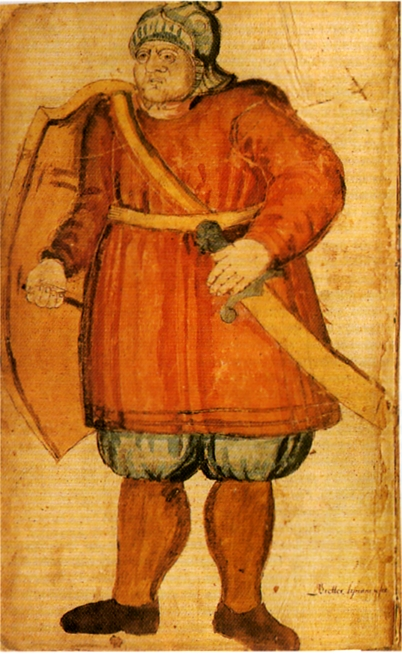
Grettir is ready to fight in this illustration from a 17th-century Icelandic manuscript.

== Overview ==
Grettis saga is considered one of the Sagas of Icelanders (Íslendingasögur), which were written down in the thirteenth and fourteenth centuries and record stories of events that supposedly took place between the ninth and the eleventh centuries in Iceland. The earliest manuscript of Grettis saga was written down some time just before 1400 CE, and the saga is thought to have been composed in its current form in the fourteenth century, making it a relatively late addition to the genre.

The author is unknown but it is believed that the saga may have been based on a previous account of Grettir's life written by Sturla Þórðarson. Whoever the author was, the author shows an awareness of the Sagas of Icelanders tradition by making references to other sagas and borrowing themes from the larger cultural milieu of the Germanic peoples that appear independently in other texts like the Old English Beowulf.

The saga can be split into three major sections: Chapters 1–13, Chapters 14–85, and Chapters 86–93. The first and last sections of the saga focus on Grettir's family rather than on Grettir.

Chapters 1–13 primarily focus on how Grettir's viking great-grandfather Ǫnundr Tree-foot escaped Norway to settle in Iceland after fighting in the Battle of Hafrsfjord against the first king of Norway Harald Fairhair. Chapters 14–85 primarily focus on the life, condemnation, and death of Grettir. Chapters 86–93 focus on Grettir's half-brother Þorsteinn Drómundr's journey to the court of Constantinople to take revenge and, incidentally, find courtly love before spending the latter portion of his life in a monastic cell in Rome.

Both Grettir's viking/raider great-grandfather and his chivalry-practicing half-brother succeed whereas Grettir's quest to become a monster-slaying hero of old results in him becoming an outlaw. Christianity became the religion in Iceland around 1000 CE, and some scholars believe this changing morality explains why Grettir's fate is different than his pagan great-grandfather's before conversion and his pious, Christian half-brother's fate after conversion.

Originally, the ill-tempered Grettir experienced some success, but his life takes a turn for the worse after he encounters the undead shepherd Glámr in chapter 35. As a result of Glámr's curse, Grettir becomes disastrously unlucky, only grows weaker/never stronger, becomes afraid of the dark, and is doomed to loneliness, becoming an outlaw, and meeting an early death. While in Norway in chapter 38, Grettir accidentally sets fire to a hut, killing its occupants. In chapter 46, the Althing back in the Icelandic Commonwealth votes that Grettir is an outlaw because of the deaths this fire caused. This outlaw status forces Grettir to live on the edge of society and opens him up to being hunted by others. He is repeatedly betrayed by other outlaws and, after living 19 years as an outlaw, he dies a hunted man on the lonely island of Drangey in chapter 82. In chapter 77, it is stated that Grettir would have ceased being an outlaw after 20 years.

== Summary ==
=== Chapters 1–13 ===
Chapters 1–13 take place before Grettir's birth and focus on his father, Ásmundr, his grandfather, Þorgrímr Grey-head, and his great-grandfather Ǫnundr. Grettir's great-grandfather Ǫnundr had been a viking/raider. In chapter two, Ǫnundr lost his leg below the knee and became Ǫnundr Tree-foot, while fighting from a ship against the Norwegian king Harald Fairhair at the Battle of Hafrsfjord. King Harald won the battle and united Norway into one kingdom. In chapter 3, those who fought King Harald fled Norway for Britain and Ireland. At one point, Ǫnundr Tree-leg fought a battle against Kjarval, who was king around Dublin. In chapter 7, Ǫnundr tree-foot visits southern Norway to assist kin. In chapter 8, he leaves Norway and arrives in Iceland to settle for good in chapter 9. Ǫnundr dies and is buried in tumulus in chapter 11, after which the saga's focus shifts to his son Þorgrímr Grey-head and his son Ásmundr Grey-hair. Ásmundr fathers Þorsteinn Drómundr while visiting Norway in Chapter 13 and then returns to Iceland.

=== Chapters 14–85 ===
Grettir's life is told from beginning to end. Chapter 14 describes Grettir's immediate family. Ásmundr Grey-hair and his wife Ásdís have two boys: (1) the eldest brother, Atli, is quiet and gentle, and (2) Grettir, is rebellious, bad-tempered, and mischievous. He is described as red haired, somewhat freckled, and broad around the eyes. They also have two daughters: (3) Þórdís and (4) Rannveig. In this chapter, it is stated the Grettir's father did not care for him much but that his mother loved him a lot. It is also revealed that Grettir grew strong and that he has a fondness for poetry. His father gives him tasks around the farmstead such as taking care of geese, but Grettir believes such work to be beneath him. Ásmundr believes Grettir will become a brawler and a ruffian.

In chapter 16, Grettir receives his first sentence for outlawry. While still very young, Grettir kills a man because he thinks he has taken his food bag. Despite attempts to pay compensation to the family similar to weregild, he is temporarily banished from Iceland and sentenced to lesser-outlawry for three years. He asks his father for a sword before he leaves, which his father refuses, but his mother Ásdís gives him a family heirloom sword from her family line in chapter 17. He then leaves for Norway for the first time after his father accords him passage on a ship due to friendship with its captain.

In chapter 18, Grettir fights his first creature, a reanimated undead or draugr of the man named Kárr inn gamli (Kar the Old). (Note: Grettir later refers to Kárr as a draugr when he recites a poem to explain he obtained the treasured weapon.) Kárr was there guarding treasure in his own funeral mound/tumulus from looters. Grettir triumphs using the sword Jǫkulsnautr (‘Jokul's Gift’, presumably passed down from his maternal great-grandfather Jǫkull Ingimundarson, son of Ingimundr Þorsteinsson who figures in the Vatnsdœla saga). Treasures are taken from the mound after Grettir's triumph, including an heirloom sword, presumably Kársnautr (‘Karr's-loom’). (Note: This sword name Kársnautr only appears later in Ch. 84 (or Kap. 82 in Boer's edition). However, the sword is present in the tale from Ch. 18 (p. 49) onward according to the index.) He has other successful adventures in Norway as well, killing bears and berserkers. He then has to flee Norway to go back to Iceland after he kills people for an insult in chapters 23 and 24.

Grettir comes back to Iceland. In Chapters 32–33 a farmer named Þórhall is losing shepherds, as his pasture is haunted by a wight. On the advice of a local elder named Skapti, Þórhall hires a Swedish shepherd named Glámr, hoping that the shepherd's extraordinary strength and size will allow him to defy the wight. At first, Glámr is successful, but after refusing to fast on Yule-tide, he is found dead in the snow, having driven the evil creature away at the cost of his own life. The villagers attempt to move Glámr to the church for burial but are unable to, and he is buried where he lies. Not long after, Glámr himself rises as a revenant and begins haunting the area. (Note: Sometimes Glámr is referred to as a draugr by commentators, but actually, Glámr is never referred to as one in the text (though he is called a "troll"). Ármann Jakobsson suggests that like the vampire, the undeadness was transmitted to him after an attack by whatever was haunting the farm.)

In Chapter 35, Grettir fights and destroys Glámr, but the revenant uses his last breath to lay a curse on him. Glámr's curse is what leads Grettir in a different direction. As a result of Glámr's curse, Grettir becomes disastrously unlucky, only grows weaker/never stronger, becomes afraid of the dark, and is doomed to loneliness, becoming an outlaw, and an early death.

While in Norway for the second time in chapter 38, Grettir accidentally kills a hut full of people by unintentionally lighting it on fire. His older brother, Atli at the family farm is killed by a man named Thorbjorn in chapter 45. In chapter 46, the Althing back in the Icelandic Commonwealth votes that Grettir is an outlaw because of the deaths the fire caused. Grettir returns home to Iceland the following chapter, 47, to learn this information for the first time. This outlaw status forces Grettir to live on the edge of society and opens him up to being hunted by others and being betrayed by other outlaws.

Grettir lives in various places running from enemies and slaying more monsters. In Chapter 69 he returns home to the farm at Bjarg and sees his mother. She sends him off with his 15 year old brother Illugi and they head off to spend the rest of the saga on the island of Drangey off the northern tip of Iceland. Part of the reason for this is that the island has steep cliffs and can only be climbed up on with the help of a ladder that can be withdrawn. Grettir eventually becomes the longest-surviving outlaw in Icelandic history. After spending over 19 years as an outlaw, his friends and family ask for his banishment to be lifted, arguing that a man could not spend more than 20 years as an outlaw according to the law (in fact, there was no such law in medieval Iceland). In chapter 77, after a debate at the assembly, it is decided that the outlawry will be lifted when he has completed the 20 years but not before. His enemies make one last effort, using sorcery to cause him to wound himself and finally defeat him, atop the cliff-sided, lonely, fortress-like Drangey off the northern tip of Iceland where he was staying with another brother of his named Illugi, and his slave Glaumr. Grettir's enemies succeed in killing him in chapter 82. Assuming that the tales of the saga bear any relationship to historical realities, Grettir would have died "some time between 1030 and 1040".

=== Chapters 86–93 ===
His half-brother, Þorsteinn Drómundr, later avenges him in a semi-comic scene in Constantinople, where the Norse served as Varangians. While in Constantinople, he falls in love with a married woman named Spes, who helps him. After Þorsteinn Drómundr completes his mission the two of them decide to spend the rest of their lives in monastic cells in Rome.

== Legacy ==
=== Place-names ===
Grettir Ásmundarson was reported to have been from Bjarg in Miðfjörður. At Bjarg, Grettir Ásmundarson could always find refuge with his mother Ásdís. Many place names in the neighbourhood of Bjarg and indeed throughout the county bear the name of the outlaw e.g. Grettishaf, Grettistak and Grettishöfði at Arnarvatn.

=== Grettisfærsla ===
The late fifteenth-century manuscript Eggertsbók contains the sole surviving text of Grettisfærsla, a poem concerning a character called Grettir which is mentioned in chapter 52 of Grettis saga. The poem is notable for its thematic focus on sex and the "indiscriminate sexuality" of its protagonist with both men and women, and even animals, expressed in direct, non-euphemistic language.

=== Rímur ===
Grettis saga inspired a number of Icelandic rímur: 15th century: Grettis rímur (8 rímur, anonymous, attested in Kollsbók) 1656: Grettis rímur (14 rímur, Jón Guðmundsson í Rauðseyjum) 1658: Grettis rímur (20 rímur, Kolbeinn Grímsson) 17th century: Grettis rímur (lost, Jón Guðmundsson í Hellu) 1828: Grettis rímur (44 rímur, Magnús Jónsson í Magnússkógum) 1889: Ríma um síðasta fund Grettis Ásmundssonar og móður hans, Ásdísar á Bjargi (1 ríma, Oddur Jónsson) 1930: Gláms rímur (6 rímur and epilogue, Sigfús Sigfússon )

=== Post-1900 culture ===
Garfield is named Grettir in Iceland, because he is rufous, a little broad and unwilling to conform to society's norms. A memorial was erected to his mother Ásdís at Bjarg in 1974. The memorial displays a relief from Grettis saga made by Icelandic artist Halldór Pétursson.

Grettir is celebrated in the long poem Eclogue from Iceland in the 1938 collection The Earth Compels by Irish poet Louis MacNeice, who had developed a love of Norse mythology while at school at Marlborough College. In it, the ghost of Grettir speaks with two men, Craven and Ryan, who have been 'hounded' from a decadent and war-threatened Europe "whose voice calls in the sirens of destroyers". He urges them to recover their underlying human values, and to assert, as he has, "the sanctity of the individual will". He tells them to return home as an act of duty, which he calls – remembering his own defiant choice to be an outlaw – "Your hazard, your act of defiance and hymn of hate, hatred of hatred, assertion of human values" and (in the poem's final words) "your only chance".

The Australian composer Percy Grainger described the Grettis Saga as the "strongest single artistic influence" in his life.

The saga was adapted in 2017 as the basis for a novel set in Sheffield by Tony Williams.

"Grettir’s last stand at Drangey" is mentioned in John K. Samson's 2011 song "Letter in Icelandic from the Ninette San".

== Modern English translations ==
- Eiríkur Magnússon; Morris, William (trr.) (1869). Grettis Saga. The Story of Grettir the Strong, translated from the Icelandic. London: F. S. Ellis.
- Baring-Gould, Sabine (1889). Grettir the Outlaw: A Story of Iceland. New York: Burt [Retold for a young audience]
- The Saga of Grettir the Strong. Translated by George Ainslie Hight. J. M. Dent. 1914.
- Foote, Peter, ed. (1972). Saga of Grettir the Strong. Translated by G.A. Hight. Everyman's Library.
- Grettir's Saga. Translated by Denton Fox; Hermann Pálsson. Toronto: University of Toronto Press. 1974.
- Faulkes, Anthony (2004). Three Icelandic Outlaw Sagas: The Saga of Gísli, The Saga of Grettir, The Saga of Hord. London: Viking Society for Northern Research.
- Thorsson, Örnólfur, ed. (2005). The Saga of Grettir the Strong. Translated by Bernard Scudder. New York: Penguin Books.
- Grettir's Saga. Translated by Jesse Byock. Oxford: Oxford University Press. 2009.

== Bibliography ==
- Boer, Richard Constant, ed. (1900), Grettis saga Ásmundarsonar, Halle an der Saale: Max Niemeyer [The only attempt at a critical edition, based on a partial survey of the mss; the edited and normalised text of the prose and the heavily emended verse material is obsolete and unreliable, and should not be used for quotation]
- Guðni Jónsson, ed. (1936). Grettis saga Ásmundarsonar, Bandamanna saga, Odds þáttr Ófeigssonar. Íslenzk fornrit 7. Reykjavík: Hið íslenzka fornritafélag. [The default standard modern edition of the saga; not a detailed critical edition]
- Hume, Kathryn (1974). 'The Thematic Design of "Grettis Saga"'. Journal of English and Germanic Philology 73:4, pp. 469–86
- Hastrup, Kirsten (1986). 'Tracing Tradition—an Anthropological Perspective on Grettis saga Ásmundarsonar'. In Lindow, John, Lars Lönnroth, and Gerd Wolfgang Weber, eds. 1986. Structure and Meaning in Old Norse Literature: New Approaches to Textual Analysis and Literary Criticism. The Viking Collection 3. Odense: Odense Univ. Press, pp. 281–313.
- Örnólfur Thorsson, ed. (1994). Grettis saga: með formála, viðbæti, skýringum og skrám. Sígildar sögur, 4. Reykjavík: Mál og Menning [Modern Icelandic edition of the saga, with extensive notes]
- Guðvarður Már Gunnlaugsson (2000). '“Grettir vondum vættum, veitti hel og þreytti”, Grettir Ásmundarson og vinsældir Grettis sögu’. Gripla 11, 37-78
- Poole, Russell (2003). ‘“Lof en eigi háð?” The Riddle of Grettis Saga Verse 14’. Saga-Book 27, pp. 25–47
- Poole, Russell (2004). "Myth, Psychology, and Society in Grettis saga", Alvíssmál 11, 3–16.
- Bonner, Maria (2015). 'Grettir's First Escapades: How To Challenge Your Father And Get Away With It — A Case Study In Historical Dialogue Analysis.' In: Frederic Amory in Memoriam. Old Norse-Icelandic Studies. Ed. John Lindow & George Clarke. Berkeley, Los Angeles: North Pinewood Press. pp. 184–212. ISBN 978-0-692-52016-1
- Ármann Jakobsson (2011). "Vampires and watchmen: Categorizing the mediaeval Icelandic undead". Journal of English and Germanic Philology. 110 (3): 281–300. doi:10.5406/jenglgermphil.110.3.0281. S2CID 162278413.
- Grove, Jonathan (2022). 'Grettis saga Ásmundarson'. In: Skaldic Poetry of the Scandinavian Middle Ages. Volume 5: Poetry in Sagas of Icelanders. Edited by Margaret Clunies Ross, Kari Ellen Gade, and Tarrin Wills. Turnhout: Brepols. pp. 619–808 [New critical edition of the poetry in the saga, with translations and explanatory notes]
