= Waysenhússbiblía =

1747 Icelandic Bible translation

Waysenhússbiblía, also referred to as the Vajsenhússbiblía, was the fourth complete Icelandic translation of the Bible, printed in 1747 by the Kongelige Vajsenhus's print shop in Copenhagen, Denmark. Waysenhús is the Icelandic version of vajsenhus. In 1727, the Vajsenhus was granted exclusive rights by Frederick IV of Denmark to publish the Bible in Denmark–Norway.

== Production ==
Halldór Brynjólfsson, who became bishop of Hólar in 1746, had begun translating the New Testament from Danish and planned to publish it, but Bishop Ludvig Harboe suggested it would be better for the entire Bible to be published in Icelandic. The project abandoned Halldór's translation, choosing instead to base the new version on the Þorláksbiblía with some corrections to the text.

== Publication ==
The New Testament was released in August 1746 as an inexpensive duodecimo edition, which at a half Danish rigsdaler would be affordable to the poor. At the same time a larger quarto edition of the New Testament was prepared. In October 1747, the Old Testament was completed in the same format. The full Bible numbered 1,742 pages and 1,000 copies were produced. The cost of the finished book was 1 rigsdaler unbound or 2 rigsdaler bound, thanks to a subsidy from the churches of Iceland.

== Reprint ==
Demand for the Waysenhússbiblía was high and in 1750 an additional 2,000 copies of the duodecimo New Testament were reprinted in the same format.
