= Icelandic Bible Society =

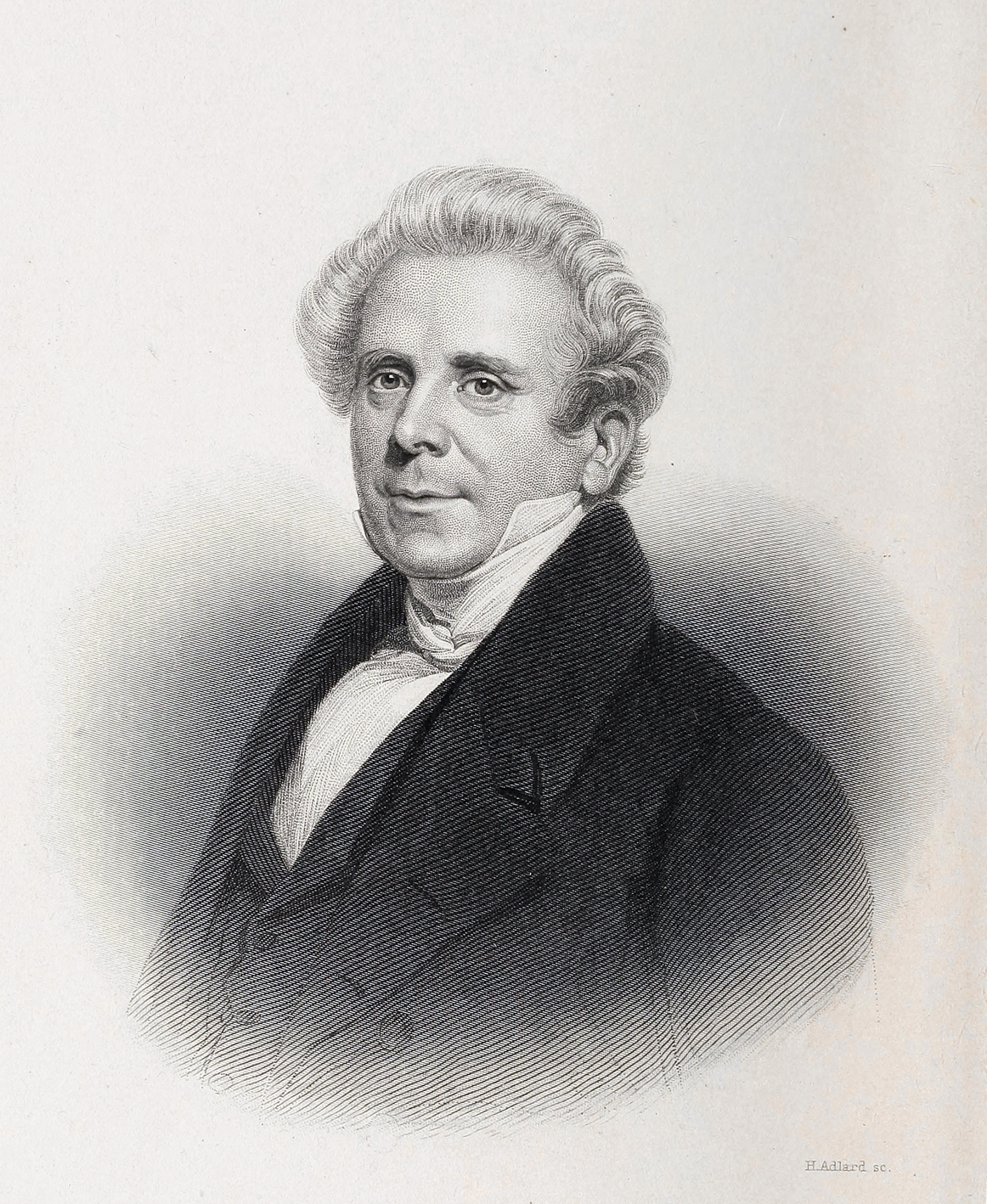
Rev. Ebenezer Henderson (1784 – 1858)

The Icelandic Bible Society (Icelandic: Hið íslenska Biblíufélag) is an association that was founded on July 10, 1815, to work on the publication and dissemination of the Bible in Icelandic. The Society was founded by Scottish minister, Ebenezer Henderson, who was traveling to Iceland at the time at the behest of the British and Foreign Bible Society.

The association is the oldest operating association in Iceland.
