= Auðr Vésteinsdóttir =

Saga character

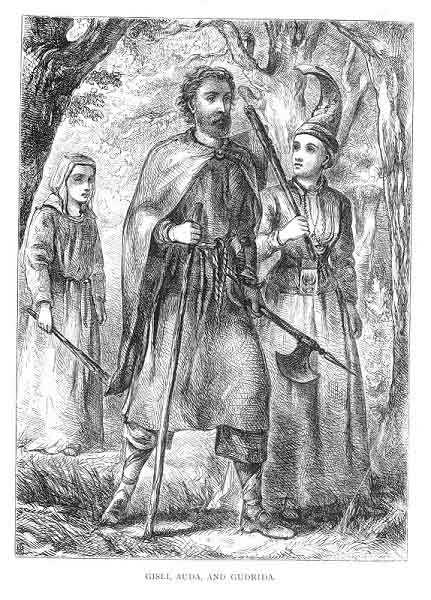
Aud with her family, illustrated in 1866 translation of Gísla saga by G. W. DaSent.

Auðr Vésteinsdóttir (anglicised as Aud) is a character in Gísla saga súrssonar. The loyal wife of the protagonist, Gísli, she harbours him during his outlawry, protects her nephews from him, and responds violently to attempts by his enemies to bribe her or to attack Gísli. Scholars have highlighted her heroic strength of character and the stability of her and Gísli’s marriage.

== Gísla saga ==
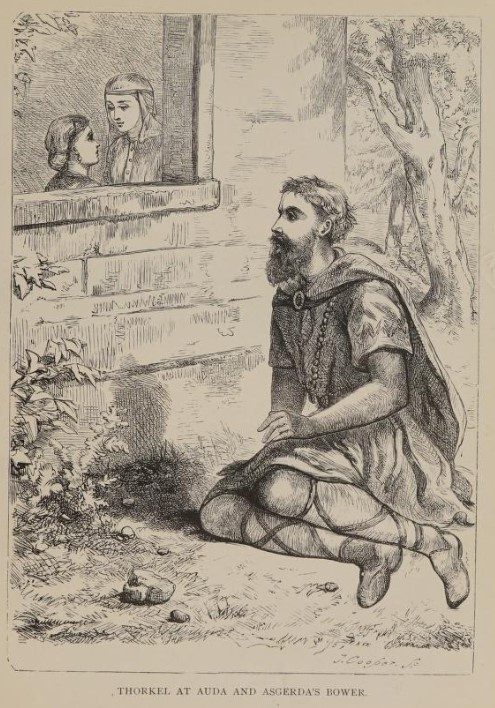
Thorkel overhearing the conversation between Auðr and Ásgerðr, illustrated in DaSent's translation.

Auðr is the daughter of Vésteinn and the sister of Vésteinn Vésteinsson. She marries Gísli súrsson and lives with him and his brother Þorkell at their farm, Hol. Together they care for a foster-daughter, Gúðríðr.

The main feud of the saga begins when Þorkell overhears his wife, Ásgerðr, talking with Auðr about their previous romantic entanglements. Gísli's brother-in-law Þorgrímr (or perhaps Þorkell) murders Vésteinn, and Gísli kills Þorgrímr in retribution, for which he is outlawed.

Moving to a newly built home at Geirþjófsfjörður, Auðr manages the household during Gísli's outlawry and sometimes harbours him there. She is the addressee of much of Gísli's later poetry, where he describes the symbolic dreams he has to her.

At one point during Gísli’s outlawry, Auðr is approached for help by her nephews, who have killed Þorkell. She sends them away to prevent Gísli from killing them in revenge for his brother.

Gísli’s main opponent, Eyjólfr grái, attempts to bribe Auðr to give up Gísli with a bag of silver coins. She takes the silver and strikes him in the face with it, declaring that she will never betray Gísli. Eyjolfr attempts to kill Auðr but is prevented by his companion.

Finally, Auðr and Gúðríðr defend Gísli when he is attacked by Eyjolfr and his men, striking Eyjolfr on the arm with a club. Gísli is eventually killed in the battle.

After the death of her husband, Auðr travels with Gúðríðr and her nephews to Norway, and then to Hedeby, where they convert to Christianity and go on pilgrimage to Rome.

== Reception ==
Auðr is noted for her role as interlocutor in Gísli's poetry, where she is compared and conflated with the prophetic 'good dream-woman' who appears in his poems. He also composes several stanzas in honour of her, expressing his confidence that she will never betray him and his praise at her defence against Eyjólfr.

Auðr and Gísli's loving relationship is highlighted: her response to her and Ásgerðr's compromising conversation is to explain the situation to Gísli and ask for his advice, whereas Ásgerðr intimidates her husband into dropping the matter by threatening to divorce him. Gísli's love for Auðr means that he does not want to be separated from her for long during his outlawry. Auðr, and especially the scene where she prevents Gísli from killing her nephews, are interpreted as Gísli's last ties to humanity and community.

Like Freydís Eiríksdóttir, Auðr and her sister-in-law Þórdís are noted as women saga characters who personally use violence: Auðr strikes Eyjólfr twice and Þórdís attacks him with a sword.

== In popular culture ==
Auðr was portrayed by Amy Leslie in a 1902 reading of Gísla Saga by the Viking Society.

She was portrayed by Ragnheiður Steindórsdóttir in Útlaginn (Outlaw: The Saga of Gisli), a 1981 Icelandic film adaptation of Gísla saga. Auðr serves as the film's narrator.
