= Oddur Gottskálksson's New Testament =

Oddur Gottskálksson's translation of the New Testament into Icelandic

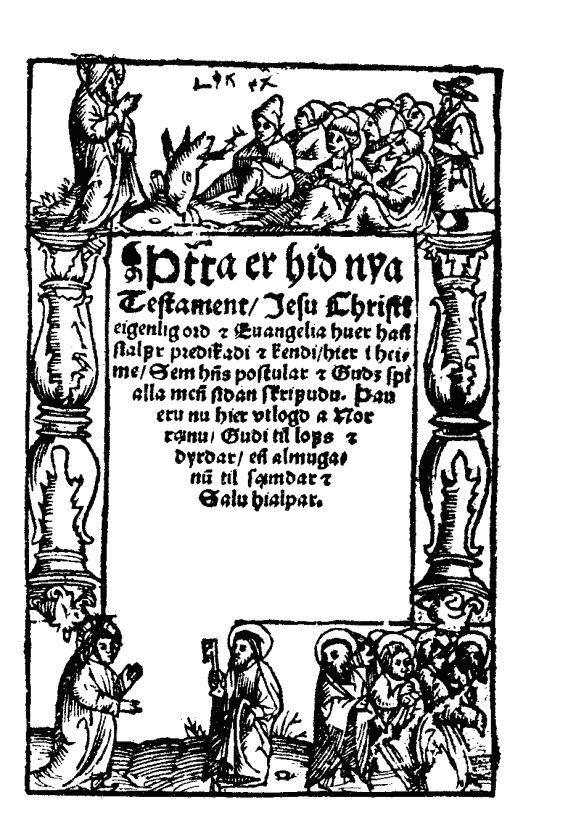
The title page of Oddur Gottskálksson's translation of the New Testament into Icelandic.

Oddur Gottskálksson's New Testament (Icelandic: Nýja testamenti Odds Gottskálkssonar; full title: Þetta er hið nýja Testament Jesu Christi eiginleg orð og Evangelia hver hann sjálfur predikaði og kenndi hér i heimi sem hans postular og Guð spjalla menn síðan skrifuðu) is a translation of the New Testament into Icelandic. It is the oldest preserved book printed in the Icelandic language.

== History ==
Oddur Gottskálksson likely began translating the New Testament in Skálholt in 1534 or 1535, working in a cowshed to hide his work from the Roman Catholic bishop Ögmundur Pálsson, whom Oddur worked for as a scribe. In spring 1539, Oddur travelled to Denmark and presented King Christian III with a copy of his translation. On 9 November of that year, Christian III approved its printing after having scholars compare it to the Latin text. The printing was completed in Roskilde, Denmark, on 12 April 1540 as a 330-page octavo small format. It is not known how many copies were printed, but Oddur intended for every priest in Iceland to receive a copy.

== Influence ==
Oddur's translation is believed to be made primarily from a 1530 edition of Martin Luther's German translation with comparison to the Latin Vulgate and perhaps Erasmus of Rotterdam's translation from Greek. Oddur included Luther's prefaces to each of the books, except the Book of Revelation, as well as Luther's marginal notes.

The 1540 New Testament includes indicators of the transition from Old Icelandic to a more modern form of the language, although it is heavily influenced by the Latin Vulgate. It marked an official recognition by the Danish church of Icelandic as a separate language and influenced the style of future Bible translations into Icelandic.
