= Outlaw: The Saga of Gisli =

1981 Icelandic film by Ágúst Guðmundsson

- Video case
- Directed by: Ágúst Guðmundsson
- Written by: Ágúst Guðmundsson
- Produced by: Jón Hermannsson
- Cinematography: Sigurður Sverrir Pálsson
- Edited by: William River
- Music by: Áskell Másson
- Release date: 31 October 1981
- Running time: 100 minutes
- Country: Iceland
- Language: Icelandic

Outlaw: The Saga of Gisli (Icelandic: Útlaginn) is a 1981 Icelandic film adaptation of the Gísla saga, the story of a blood feud set in 8th-century Iceland. It was directed by Ágúst Guðmundsson.

The film was released on 17 February 1984 to critical acclaim in Sweden, and then in West Germany. Written and directed by Ágúst Guðmundsson, the theatrical version of the Saga of Gisli Sursson was praised as a culturally accurate representation of the time period.

The film was selected as the Icelandic entry for the Best Foreign Language Film at the 54th Academy Awards, but was not accepted as a nominee.

== Plot summary ==
This Icelandic Saga begins with Gisli, Thorgrim, Thorkel, and Vestein making a blood pact to protect one another. Controversy breaks out when one of the men, Thorgrim, refuses to complete the pact because he does not want any involvement with Vestein. Thorgrim claims that taking on Vestein as a brother is taking on more trouble than he can handle. The scene ends with the men storming off from one another and the blood oath incomplete. The plot begins to unfold when Thorkel hears his wife tell Aud, Gisli's wife, that she had amorous feelings for Vestein before she married Thorkel, leading Thorkel to suspect his wife was unfaithful.

As the saga continues, Vestein is killed one night in Gisli's home by a masked man. Gisli rushes into the house and pulls the spear from Vestein's dead body thereby ensuring that he will avenge Vestein's murder. Gisli, with some investigation of his own, concludes that Thorgrim is responsible for the death of Vestein. Therefore, he convinces one of Thorgrim's servants to leave the door to Thorgrim's house open one night. Gisli enters the house and stabs Thorgrim with the same spear that Thorgrim supposedly used to kill Vestein. A group of Thorgrim's servants race to Gisli's home to inquire if anyone strange has come by but they have no luck. After the funeral Bork, Thorgrim's brother, marries Thorgrim's widow, Thordis, who is also Gisli's sister. Thordis then tells her new husband that she believes Gisli is responsible for the death of her first husband. In addition, she tells Bork that he must kill Gisli in order to get revenge for the murder of his brother and she will marry him. As a result, some of Bork's men travel to a sorcerer to convince him to place a curse on the Thorgrim's murderer.

The sorcerer interferes with Gisli's dreams so that he has nightmares. Gisli, throughout the saga, is confronted with dreams of an evil woman and a good woman. These women play a crucial role in his daily life and the dreams seem to reveal the intentions of the women. These women are his sister, Thordis, and his wife, Aud. Gisli then flees his home, just before Bork and his men arrive and harass his wife and daughter. Cursed by the sorcerer, Gisli runs from the gang of men that is after him and is almost captured on numerous occasions. One example of his great escapes is when one of Bork's men come to an island and discovers that Gisli is there hiding with a poor farmer and his wife. When Gisli finds out that his enemies know where he stays he decides to act like the halfwit, who occasionally sits on the lawn, in order to escape from his pursuers. On this same occurrence he escapes another time by lying under a woman's mattress while the gang of men search the house.

Another great escape is when Gisli decides to hide in a cave near his home and is one day discovered by one of the men. As this is happening, Vestein's two sons dress up as girls and kill Thorkel, Gisli's brother, who they believe was partially responsible for the death of their father. They run to Gisli's wife, Vestein's sister, for help but she refuses and tells the children to run away before Gisli returns. Eyjolf, one of Bork's henchmen, along with the rest of the gang, finds Gisli. Gisli, tired of fleeing from the men, fights to his death, killing many of Bork's henchmen. Surprisingly, Thordis feels guilty for encouraging Bork to kill her brother after she learns Gisli is dead. As a result of her guilt, when Eyjolf visits Bork, Thordis attempts to stab him with a knife to avenge her brother's death. In the saga's conclusion, Thordis divorces Bork in front of Eyjolf and the other house guests.

== Cast and characters ==
Character	Actor	Information
Gisli	Arnar Jónsson	Protagonist who is forced into seeking vengeance after the death of his brother-in law, Vestein.
Aud	Ragnheiður Steindórsdóttir	Gisli's wife. Vestein's sister. Stays loyal to her husband even when faced with her own death.
Thorgrim	Benedikt Sigurðarson	Brother-in-law to Gisli and suspected murderer of Vestein. Refused to make the oath with Vestein because he felt it would cause him more trouble and stress.
Thorkel	Þráinn Karlsson	Brother of Gisli whose wife's interest in Vestein is believed to indirectly lead to his death .
Asgerd	Kristin Kristjansdottir	Wife of Thorkel who has a crush on Vestein.
Vestein	Kristján Jóhann Jónsson	Brother-in-law to Gisli who is murdered in his sleep.
Eyjolf	Helgi Skúlason	Leader of the group of men who hunt Gisli.
Thordis	Tinna Gunnlaugsdóttir	Wife to Thorgrim and sister to Gisli. Urges Bork to avenge the death of his brother Thorgrim by killing Gisli.
Bork	Bjarni Steingrímsson	Brother to Thorgrim who marries Thordis shortly after his brother's death. Is talked into seeking vengeance for his brother's death by Thordis.
Helgi	Sveinbjorn Matthiasson	One of Eyjolf's Men.

== Relation to source ==
There are slight deviations throughout the film relative to the text of the Gísla saga. The role of Gisli's dreams seems unimportant throughout the course of the film until the final battle between Gisli and his hunters, but in the saga his dreams played a bigger role in predicting his fate. Also, the saga did not give faces to the women portrayed in Gisli's dreams. The film, however, depicts the good dream woman as Gisli's wife and the bad dream woman as his sister. This may have been done in the film to ensure that the audience realized the critical roles that the women played in the course of events in the story.

In the text, the character of Gisli was depicted as a larger than life character who “died with so many and such great wounds that it was an amazement to all". This assessment of Gisli's death leads the reader to believe that Gisli was in fact a humongous man with an irrefutable spirit. In the movie however, Gisli was depicted as a man of normal stature with the will to overcome the obstacles placed before him and to fight through the challenges he had.

== See also ==
- Gísla saga
- List of historical drama films
- List of submissions to the 54th Academy Awards for Best Foreign Language Film
- List of Icelandic submissions for the Academy Award for Best Foreign Language Film
