= Helskór =

Mythical shoes for the dead in Norse mythology

In Norse mythology, helskór ("hel-shoes") were purportedly placed on the dead so that they could walk to Valhalla.

The custom is mentioned in Gísla saga Súrssonar (14) when Vésteinn is buried:

And when they had heaped up the howe, and were going to lay the body in it, Thorgrim the priest goes up to Gisli, and says, “’Tis the custom, brother-in-law, to bind the hellshoe on men, so that they may walk on them to Valhalla, and I will now do that by Vestein.”

—The story of Gisli the Outlaw, Dasent's translation

The Norse tradition preserved in Gisla saga Surssonar in regard to the importance for the dead to be provided with shoes reappears as a popular tradition in several places That Hel-shoes were to be had for those who were not supplied with them, but still deserved them, is probably a genuine mythological idea. Visio Godeschalci describes a journey to the underworld made by a Holstein peasant named Godeskalk, who belonged to the generation immediately preceding the one converted to Christianity. There he saw an immensely large and beautiful linden-tree hanging full of shoes, which were handed down to such dead travellers as had exercised mercy during their lives. When the dead had passed this tree they had to cross a heath two miles (3 km) wide, thickly grown with thorns, and then they came to a river full of irons with sharp edges. The unjust had to wade through this river, and suffered immensely. They were cut and mangled in every limb; but when they reached the other strand, their bodies were the same as they had been when they began crossing the river. (Similarly, in the Eddic poem Sólarljóð (42), a dying skald hears the roaring of subterranean streams mixed with blood). The just are able to cross the river by putting their feet on boards a foot wide and fourteen feet long, which floated on the water. This is the first day's journey. On the second day they come to a point where the road forked into three ways - one to heaven, one to hell, and one between these realms.
