= Bracken Ridge State High School =

Secondary school in Brisbane, Australia

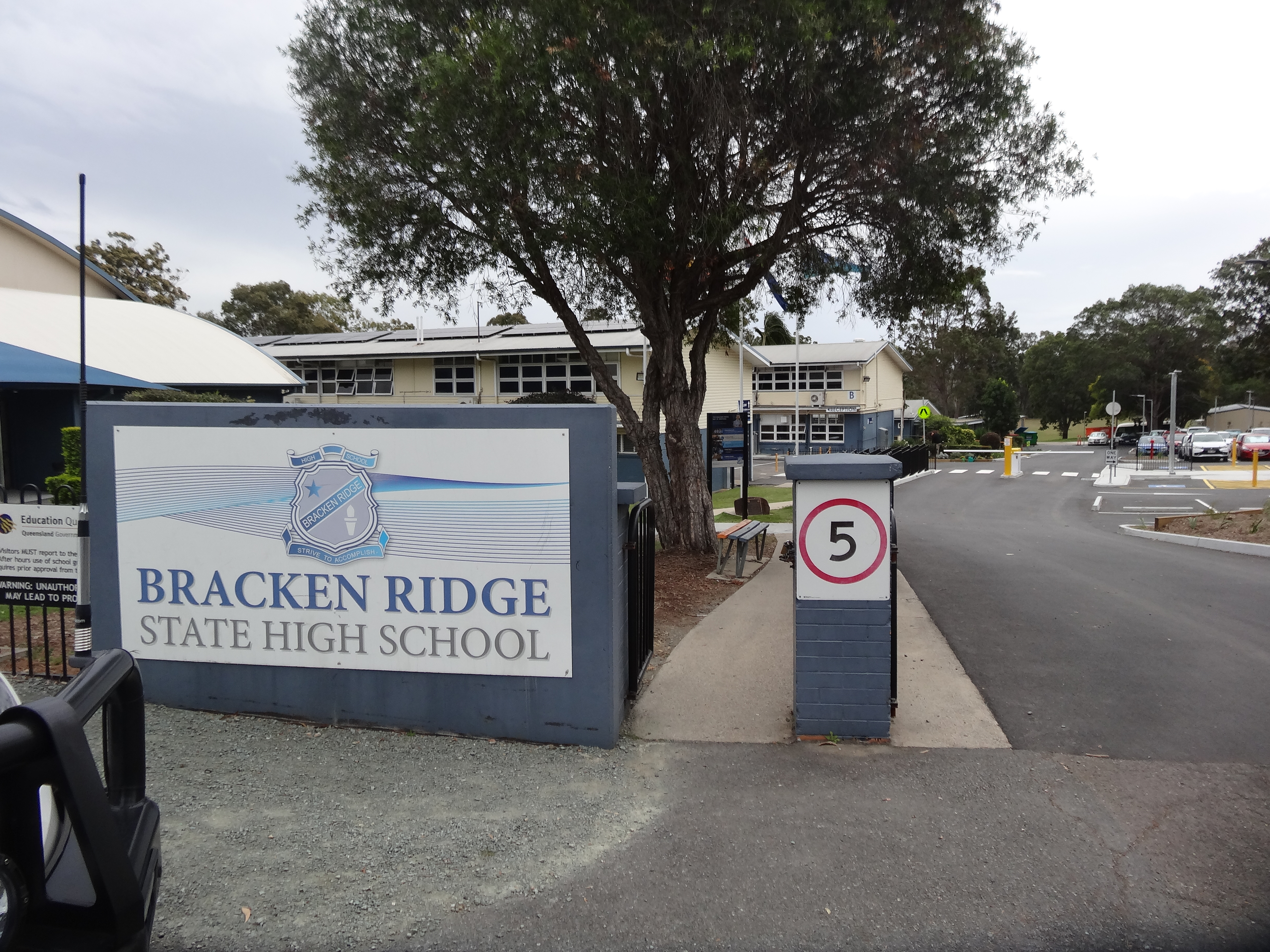
- Main Entrance, 2023

Location
- 68 Barfoot Street; Bracken Ridge, Brisbane, Queensland, 4017; Australia; 27.30744°S 153.04392°E

Information
- Former name: Nashville State High School
- Type: State secondary day school
- Motto: Strive To Accomplish
- Religious affiliation: Non-denominational
- Established: 1967
- Authority: Department of Education (Queensland)
- Principal: Michelle Lyons
- Staff: 63 (Teaching); 32 (Non-Teaching)
- Year levels: Year 7 – Year 12
- Gender: Coeducational
- Enrolment: 626 (August 2025)
- Language: English
- Campus type: Urban
- Colours: Navy blue; Sky blue; White
- Website: brackenridgeshs.eq.edu.au

Bracken Ridge State High School (BRSHS) is a public co-educational secondary school located in the Brisbane suburb of Bracken Ridge (Queensland, Australia), serving the suburbs of Brighton, Bracken Ridge, Nashville, Sandgate, Shorncliffe, and Bald Hills. It is administered by the Queensland Department of Education. The school is located within the Bracken Ridge ward of Brisbane City Council.

== History ==
The school opened on 23 January 1967, under the name Nashville State High School, which changed to its current name on 25 September 2000.

In 2018, the school developed Australia's first "off the grid" classroom, a classroom using just renewable energy around the clock. The project was run by Hivve Technologies Pty Ltd and received an Australian government grant of more than $370,000 through the Australian Renewable Energy Agency.

The school celebrated its 50th anniversary on 1–2 September 2017.

== Staff demographics ==
=== Staff ===
In 2024, the school had 63 teachers (59.1 full-time equivalent) and 32 non-teaching staff (23.0 full-time equivalent).

=== Principals ===
The school's first principal was Noel Rollings, and, as of 2026, the current principal is Michelle Lyons. The prior principals have included:

Past Principals
Tenure		Principal	Ref
Initial	Final	Principal	Ref
2022	Current	Michelle T. Lyons	
2020	2022	Ross W. Bailey	
2015	2019	Roger Atkins	
2011	2015	Jeffrey E. Hennessey†	
2007	2011	David G. Friis	

† During 2014, Regina Garrick (Deputy Principal) took on the role as acting principal.

Principals prior to this include Jeff J. Major.

== Student demographics ==
Until 2014, the school catered for students from year 8 to year 12, however, the school has catered for students from year 7 to year 12 from 2015 to the current day.

In 2025, the school had 626 students enrolled in the school, with a maximum student enrolment capacity of 827 students. Enrolments trends for recent years have included:

Student enrolment trends
Year	Years						Boys	Girls	Total	School Capacity	Ref
Year	7	8	9	10	11	12	Boys	Girls	Total	School Capacity	Ref
1991	-	88	77	94	97	80	-	-	436	-	
1992	-	84	87	84	83	93	-	-	431	-	
1993	-	73	86	79	77	71	-	-	386	-	
1994	-	82	74	82	61	63	-	-	362	-	
1995	-	73	82	80	67	48	-	-	350	-	
1996	-	97	71	85	65	61	-	-	379	-	
1997	-	92	100	84	73	53	-	-	402	-	
1998	-	100	99	105	65	61	-	-	379	-	
1999	-	123	94	108	101	53	-	-	479	-	
2000	-	112	123	96	90	84	-	-	505	-	
2001	-	119	119	120	83	78	-	-	519	-	
2002	-	132	116	124	108	75	-	-	555	-	
2003	-	116	131	119	112	103	-	-	581	-	
2004	-	112	112	134	110	88	-	-	556	-	
2005	-	120	100	118	111	90	-	-	539	-	
2006	-	144	120	105	120	83	-	-	572	-	
2007	-	144	142	125	107	94	-	-	612	-	
2008	-	127	136	139	127	86.6	-	-	615.6	-	
2009	-	110	130	140	145	85	-	-	610	-	
2010	-	-	-	-	-	-	277	265	542	-	
2011	-	-	-	-	-	-	250	242	492	-	
2012	-	-	-	-	-	-	262	225	487	-	
2013	-	-	-	-	-	-	267	233	500	-	
2014	-	-	-	-	-	-	231	220	451	-	
Addition of year 7
2015	-	-	-	-	-	-	249	218	467	-	
2016	-	-	-	-	-	-	266	217	483	-	
2017	-	-	-	-	-	-	266	218	484	-	
2018	104	116	98	91	49	62	263	257	520	-	
2019	122	114	119	88	82	43	290	278	568	-	
2020	133	124	116	116	86	69	344	300	644	718	
2021	127	123	119	108	100	80	345	312	657	718	
2022	120	131	117	105	93	89	337	318	655	718	
2023	116	120	127	108	87	82	329	311	640	718	
2024	138	117	121	112	76	70	325	309	634	718	
2025	TBA	TBA	TBA	TBA	TBA	TBA	329	297	626	718	
2026	TBA	TBA	TBA	TBA	TBA	TBA	TBA	TBA	TBA	827	

In 2025, Indigenous enrolments accounted for a total of 12%, and 13% of students had a Languages Other Than English background. The trend has been:

Multicultural Composition
Year	Indigenous (%)	Language Background other than English (LBOTE) (%)	Ref
2014	8	5	
2015	6	9	
2016	7	8	
2017	7	9	
2018	8	9	
2019	7	9	
2020	8	9	
2021	9	10	
2022	9	10	
2023	10	9	
2024	12	10	
2025	12	13	
2026	TBA	TBA	

== Notable alumni ==
Notable alumni
Student	Achievement	Ref
Trent Dalton	Novelist and journalist	
Jeremy Neale	Singer and songwriter	
Kári Gíslason	Literature professor and author	

== See also ==
- Education in Queensland
- History of state education in Queensland
- List of schools in Greater Brisbane
- List of schools in Queensland
- Lists of schools in Australia
