= Grettisfærsla =

Old Icelandic poem

Grettisfærsla ('The Handing on of Grettir') is an Old Icelandic poem, preserved in a fragmentary state only in the manuscript Eggertsbók. The poem concerns a character called Grettir and is referred to in chapter 52 of Grettis saga. The poem is notable for its thematic focus on sex and the "indiscriminate sexuality" of its outlaw protagonist, expressed in direct, non-euphemistic language.
