= Kári Gíslason =

Icelandic-Australian writer and academic

- Born: 1972 (age 53–54); Reykjavík, Iceland
- Education: University of Queensland, Árni Magnússon Institute
- Occupations: Writer, academic
- Writing career
- Language: English, Icelandic
- Notable works: The Promise of Iceland, The Ash Burner, Saga Land, The Sorrow Stone, Running with Pirates

Kári Gíslason is an Icelandic-Australian writer and academic. He is a Professor in the School of Creative Arts at the Queensland University of Technology. Much of Gíslason's writing focuses on Icelandic sagas and Iceland in general, but he has also published other travel and culture-focused writing.

== Family and early life ==
Gíslason was born in 1972 in Reykjavík, Iceland to an English mother who had moved to Australia during her youth and an Icelandic father. His father had been in an affair with Gíslason's mother and also had a wife and children; one of Gíslason's half-brothers, Ólafur, later died in a car crash. As a result of the affair, Gíslason's existence was kept hidden from his father's family. Gíslason's biological parents split when he was a small child.

As a child, Gíslason worked as a newspaper hawker in Reykjavík before moving to England with his mother, and then to Queensland, Australia several years later.

He was a student at Brisbane's Nashville State High School, now known as Bracken Ridge State High School. After Gíslason left secondary school, he travelled to Iceland to meet with his biological father, and eventually made contact with his half-siblings.

== Writing ==
Gíslason's first book-length work was The Promise of Iceland (University of Queensland Press, 2011), a memoir focusing on his childhood family situation.

This was followed by The Ash Burner (UQP, 2012), a novel set in Australia.

In 2017, Gíslason published Saga Land: The island of stories at the edge of the world (ABC Books/HarperCollins) with co-author Richard Fidler. The book contains travel memoir material, Gíslason's recounting of his childhood and family situation, and retellings of Icelandic sagas.

The Sorrow Stone (UQP, 2022) is a retelling of the story of a character in Gísla saga, Disa (Þórdís Súrsdóttir), who is forced to flee across Iceland with her son Sindri (Snorri Goði) after a revenge stabbing.

Running with Pirates (UQP, 2024) is a travel memoir set in Corfu, Greece, telling the story of Gíslason and a friend named Paul travelling to Corfu, where they attempt to find work in the village of Karousades, and form a close alliance with a man known as The Pirate.

Gíslason's short-form travel writing has been published in numerous Australian outlets, including the Escape section of The Sunday Telegraph, The Courier-Mail and The Australian.

== Education and academic career ==
Gíslason obtained a PhD from the University of Queensland in 2003, and has held teaching posts at the University of Iceland, the University of Tübingen, Bond University, the University of Queensland and the Queensland University of Technology. He has also worked as a secondary school teacher in Iceland.

He also holds a Bachelor of Laws, a Bachelor of Arts and a Master of Arts from the University of Queensland, and conducted saga research at the Árni Magnússon Institute during his Australia-based studies.
