= Ebenezer Henderson (writer) =

Scottish historian and science writer

Ebenezer Henderson (25 February 1809 – 2 November 1879) was a Scottish historian and science writer. His major work was The Annals of Dunfermline.

== Life ==
Henderson was born in Dunfermline on 25 February 1809; he was ninth of ten children of John Henderson, a watch and clock maker, and his wife Janet. His uncle was the missionary Ebenezer Henderson. He learned his father's business, but was particularly interested in scientific pursuits, producing by 1827 an orrery and an astronomical clock.

Between 1829 and 1863 he lived in England, mainly in Liverpool and London. His nominal post at first was clerk and assistant to his brother, a tanner in St Helens, Merseyside, but for a period he was curator of the Liverpool Astronomical Institution and Observatory, where he also lectured. Henderson wrote in popular science journals, and continued his astronomical studies, becoming a member of thirteen scientific societies in England. On 9 September 1839 he married Betsy Coldstream Brody.

In 1850 he was highly commended by George Biddell Airy, François Arago and others for a mechanism designed to show and check sidereal time. He devoted much time on the archaeological and historical notes that ultimately developed into The Annals of Dunfermline. In 1856 he achieved the recognition of Dunfermline as a city. The freedom of Elgin was conferred upon Henderson in 1858, and the freedom of Dunfermline in 1859.

Henderson became a member of five Scottish scientific societies, and wrote papers both for these and for English societies.

In 1866 he settled in Muckhart, at that time in Perthshire. In his latter years he was instrumental in restoring the old market cross of Dunfermline (1868), and "Queen Margaret's Stone", on the Dunfermline and Queensferry road, for which he wrote the inscription.

Henderson died in Muckhart on 2 November 1879. He had no children.

== Publications ==
Besides smaller works, Henderson published

- Historical Treatise on Horology (1836)
- Treatise on Astronomy, which reached a third edition in 1848
- Life of James Ferguson, F.R.S., in a brief autobiographical account and further extended Memoir (1867)
- The Annals of Dunfermline and Vicinity, from the earliest authentic period to the present time, A.D. 1069–1878 (1879)
