= Eggertsbók =

15th-century Icelandic manuscript

Eggertsbók (Reykjavík, Stofnun Árna Magnússonar, AM 556a-b 4to) is a fragmentary Icelandic manuscript, produced in the last quarter of the fifteenth century; its provenance is currently unknown. The manuscript now survives bound in two separate parts, now known as 'a' and 'b'. However, it is likely that originally the 'b' section came first.

The manuscript is named after its earliest clearly identifiable owner, Eggert Hannesson (c. 1515–83).

Best known as the earliest manuscript of Gísla saga Súrssonar, the manuscript is also the earliest (if incomplete) witness to Jarlmanns saga ok Hermanns and Sigrgarðs saga frækna, and the only witness to the poem Grettisfærsla.

== Contents ==
As catalogued at Handrit.is, the manuscript contains the following texts:

=== AM 556b 4to ===
- Mágus saga jarls — Bragða-Mágus saga (1r-24v)
- Jarlmanns saga og Hermanns (25r-35r)
- Þorsteins saga Víkingssonar (35r-46v)

=== AM 556a 4to ===
- Sigurgarðs saga frækna — Saga af Sigurgarði hinum frækna (1r-5r)
- Grettis saga (5r-52r)
- Grettisfærsla (52r-53r)
- Gísla saga Súrssonar (53r-70r)
- Harðar saga og Hólmverja (70r-88r)
