= Tony Williams (author) =

British poet and novelist

Tony Williams (Anthony David Henry Williams) is a British poet and novelist, and an academic teacher of creative writing. He is currently employed at Northumbria University. His work has received a number of awards.

== Select bibliography ==
=== PhD ===
- "Contemporary Pastoral: Sean O Brien, Peter Didsbury, Michael Hofmann; and Original Poetry Collection" (Sheffield Hallam University, 2009)

=== Poetry ===
- Williams, Tony (2014) The Midlands. Nine Arches Press, Rugby. ISBN 978-0992758936
- Williams, Tony (2011) All the Rooms of Uncle's Head. Nine Arches Press, Rugby. ISBN 9780956551474. Poetry Book Society's Pamphlet Choice for Winter 2011.
- Williams, Tony (2009) The Corner of Arundel Lane and Charles Street. Salt Publishing, London. ISBN 9781844719266. Shortlisted for the Aldeburgh First Collection Prize, the Portico Prize for Literature and the Michael Murphy Memorial Prize.

=== Short stories ===
- Williams, Tony (2012) All the Bananas I've Never Eaten: Tales of Love and Loneliness. Salt Publishing, Norfolk, UK. ISBN 9781844713219. Best Short Story Collection in the 2013 Saboteur Awards.

=== Novels ===
- Williams, Tony (2017) Nutcase. Salt Publishing, London. ISBN 978-1-78463-106-2
- Williams, Tony (2023) Cole the Magnificent. Salt Publishing, London. ISBN 978-1-78463-278-6
