= Þórdís Súrsdóttir =

10th-century Icelandic woman and saga character

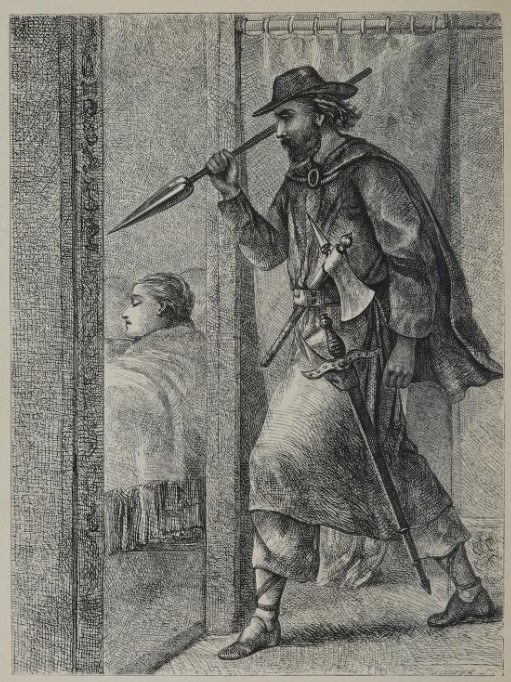
According to Gísla saga, Þórdís was in bed with her husband Þórgrímr when Gísli killed him.

Þórdís Súrsdóttir (anglicised as Thordis Sursdottir) was a tenth-century Icelandic woman who appears as a character in Gísla saga. She is noted for her depiction as a Viking Age woman who wields a sword.

== Gísla saga ==
Þórdís is the daughter of Þórbjörn súr and the sister of Gísli, the saga protagonist, and Þórkell. Growing up in Norway, Þórdís has two suitors who want to marry her, but Gísli kills them both at the instigation of their father, causing a feud. The family gains its byname súr (‘whey’) when they escape their burning house by throwing whey on the flames.

Escaping Norway, the family settles in Iceland, where Þórdís marries Þórgrímr, a local chieftain. They have a son, Snorri goði, who becomes a prominent chieftain and features in several sagas himself.

When Gísli kills Þórgrímr, Þórdís marries his brother, Börkr inn digri (‘the Stout’). Þórdís overhears Gísli reciting a poem in which he confesses that he murdered Þórgrímr. She memorises the poem and later repeats it to Börkr, who retaliates by having Gísli outlawed.

Börkr hires a man named Eyjólfr grái (‘the Grey’) to track down and kill Gísli, which he eventually succeeds in doing. Eyjólfr visits Börkr and Þórdís to share the news. Þórdís receives him coldly. While serving dinner, she seizes Gísli’s sword and attempts to stab Eyjólfr with it, striking him in the leg before being restrained by Börkr. She announces herself divorced from Börkr and goes to live at her own farm, Þórdísarstaðir.

== Eyrbyggja saga ==
Eyrbyggja saga briefly retells the incidents in Gísla saga, with a focus on Þórdís’ son Snorri. According to this saga, she was the manager of Snorri’s farm at Helgafell, and she and Börkr also had a daughter, Þúriðr.

According to Eyrbyggja saga, the bones of Þórdís and of her son Snorri were dug up in the 1180s during the moving of a church at Tunga, and reburied under the new church.

== Reception ==
As a woman whose loyalties are torn between her husband(s) and brothers, Þórdís has been compared to Gúðrún gjúkadóttir of the Sigurðr legend. Gísli composes a verse comparing Þórdís unfavourably to Gúðrún when she betrays Gísli to her husband. However, like Gúðrún, Þórdís chooses loyalty to her brother over her second husband when she attacks Eyjólfr and divorces Börkr.

The scene where Þórdís interprets Gísli’s poem is a rare depiction of how medieval people interacted with, memorised, and interpreted the cryptic verses of skaldic poetry. Although her delay in repeating it to Börkr could imply that it was done unwillingly, Börkr treats it, like Hildigunnr’s whetting of Flósi in Njáls saga, as 'cold counsel' – inciting words from women which could lead to death in the cause of maintaining honour.

Þórdís also takes violence into her own hands when she perceives men as acting in disappointing ways – in this case, because Börkr approves of Eyjólfr's killing Gísli. Börkr and Eyjólfr hold Þórdís' attack on Eyjólfr accountable to compensation (which Börkr pays). Her divorcing Börkr is a ‘toned-down’ form of revenge.

== In popular culture ==
Þórdís is portrayed by Tinna Gunnlaugsdóttir in the 1981 Icelandic film Útlaginn (Outlaw: The Saga of Gisli).

Kári Gíslason's 2022 novel The Sorrow Stone reimagines the story of Þórdís, here called Disa.
