= Den Danske Salmebog =

Danish Lutheran hymnal

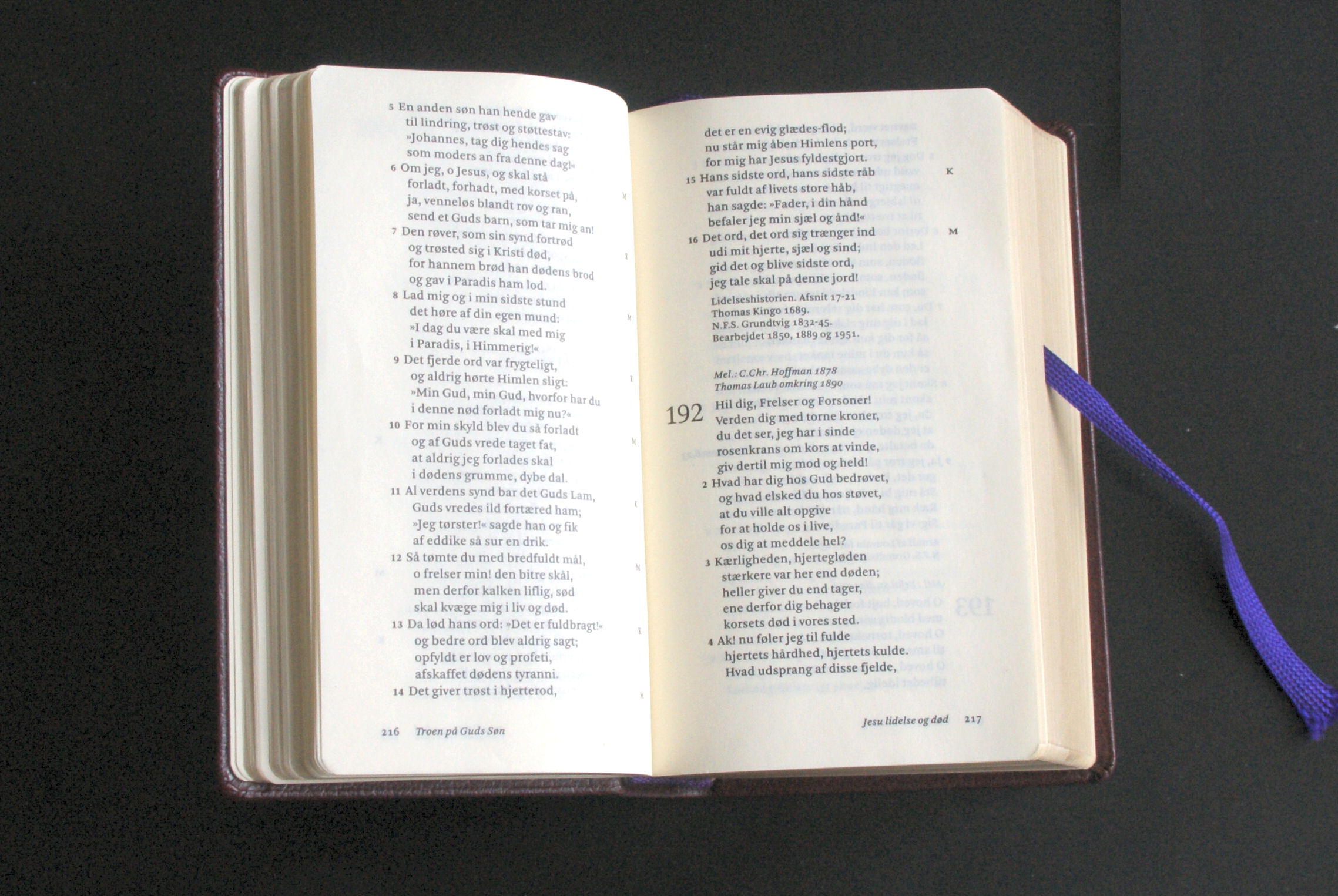
Den danske Salmebog

Den Danske Salmebog (The Danish Psalm Book or The Danish Hymnal) is a book of 791 hymns used by the Church of Denmark. It has been published in several editions, the latest issued in 2003. As well as hymns, it contains the Church's Church Order, an altar book, prayers and excerpts from Luther's Small Catechism.

== Chapters ==
- 1-14: General hymns
- 15-51: Faith in God the Father
- 52-279: Faith in the Son of God
- 280-317: Faith in God the Holy Spirit
- 318-374: The Holy Catholic Church
- 375-486: The Communion of Saints
- 487-523: The Forgiveness of Sins
- 524-575: Flesh Resurrection and Eternal Life
- 576-698: Christian Life
- 699-791: Human Life
