= Ögmundur Kristinsson =

Ögmundur Kristinsson may refer to:

- Ögmundur Kristinsson (footballer, born 1953), Icelandic footballer, see List of Iceland international footballers
- Ögmundur Kristinsson (footballer, born 1989), Icelandic footballer
