= Det Kongelige Vajsenhus =

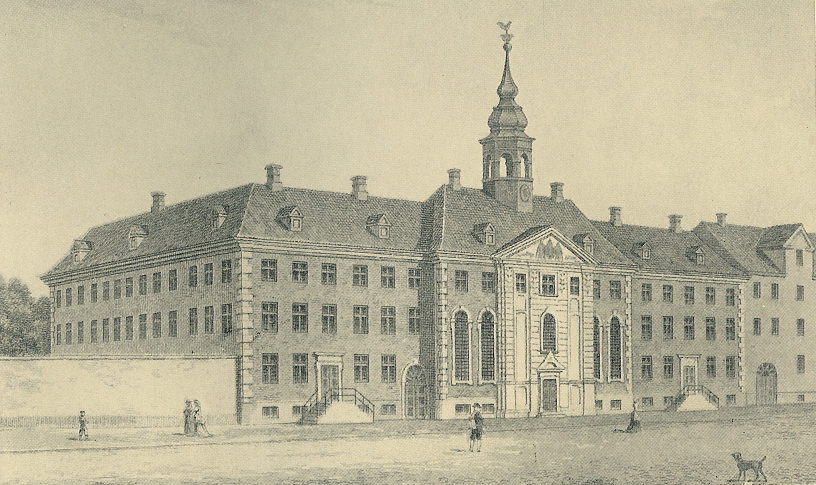
Waisenhuset in 1765–1795.

Det Kongelige Vajsenhus (The Royal Orphanage) is a private primary school in Copenhagen in Denmark. The school has around 300 students and 25 teachers. The school has the right to print Den Danske Salmebog (The Danish Psalmbook). The school was originally a combined orphanage and school, founded by Frederick IV of Denmark in 1727, and the institution was given a number of privileges, such as the right to manage a factory and a book printing shop. From 1740, it had the right to print Bibles and psalmbooks (the profit from which goes towards scholarships for some of the school's students), and during the 18th century, it was a center for Pietism in Denmark.

== History ==
In 1727 Frederick IV ordered the College of Missions to contribute materials for the opening of an orphanage in Copenhagen, and donated the buildings of the former chivalric academy in Nytorv (where the court is now located) to the project. The orphanage opened on the 11th of October, with a wide variety of privileges provided by the king, such as operating a factory and a pharmacy, as well as the printing and trading of books. During the Copenhagen Fire of 1728, the building was burnt, and a new building was built in its place.

In the late 1720s the pietist Enewold Ewald was the priest of the Vajsenhus, bringing in the influence of the Moravian Church, and the orphanage became the site of many prayer sessions. In 1740, the Vajsenhus was granted the right to print and issue the bible and the Danish Psalmbook. The Vajsenhus burnt again in the Copenhagen Fire of 1795, and the different activities of the Vajsenhus were disbursed to different places. In 1875, the school was moved to its current location in Nørre Farimagsgade. A competition was held to design the new building, which was won by Carl Ferdinand Rasmussen, who was inspired by the Florentine Renaissance.
