= Oddur Gottskálksson =

16th-century translator of the Icelandic Bible

- Born: c. 1495/96; Hólar, Iceland
- Died: 1556 (aged 41–42); Laxá í Kjós, Iceland
- Occupation: jurist
- Known for: First translation of the New Testament into Icelandic

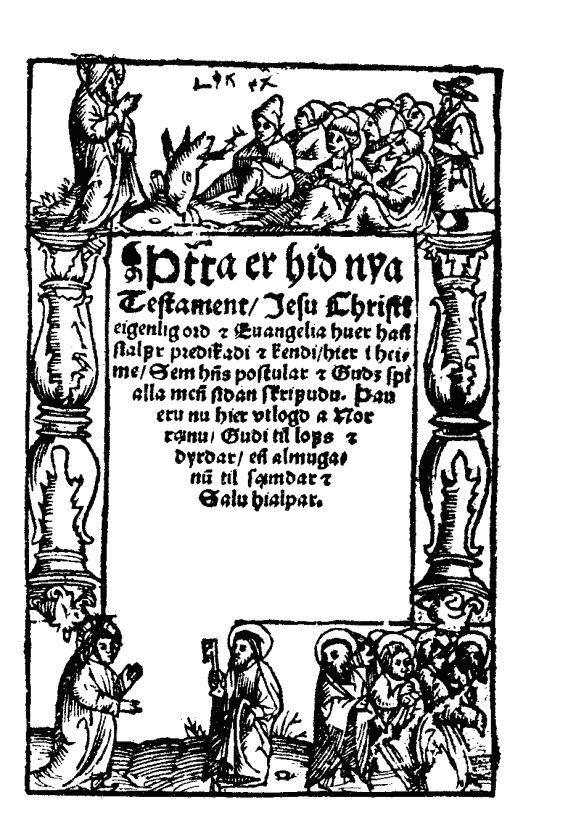
Title page of Oddur Gottskálksson's 1540 translation of the New Testament into Icelandic

Oddur Gottskálksson (1495/1496 – 1556) was the translator of the first book printed in Icelandic, the New Testament.

Oddur was born in Hólar where his father, Gottskálk grimmi Nikulásson was bishop. After his father died in 1520, Oddur was sent to live with his paternal family in Bergen, Norway. When he was a young adult, he went to study in Germany, where he became acquainted with the ideas of the Protestant Reformation. Before 1535, he returned to Iceland to serve as a scribe for the Catholic Bishop of Skálholt, Ögmundur Pálsson. It was there that he befriended Gissur Einarsson and other Reform-minded clergy and began his translation of the New Testament.

According to Oddur's own account, he did his translation work secretly in a barn: "Jesus, Our Redeemer, was laid in a donkey's crib, but now I lay in a barn to put his Word in my native language." Oddur's translation of the New Testament was published with the approval of King Christian III and the Church of Denmark in 1540, marking the acknowledgement by the church of the Icelandic language.

By 1554, Oddur had been elected as a jurist (lögmaður) for the north and west of Iceland, serving until his death in 1556. Oddur drowned while crossing the Laxá í Kjós river.
