= Ebenezer Henderson =

Scottish minister and missionary

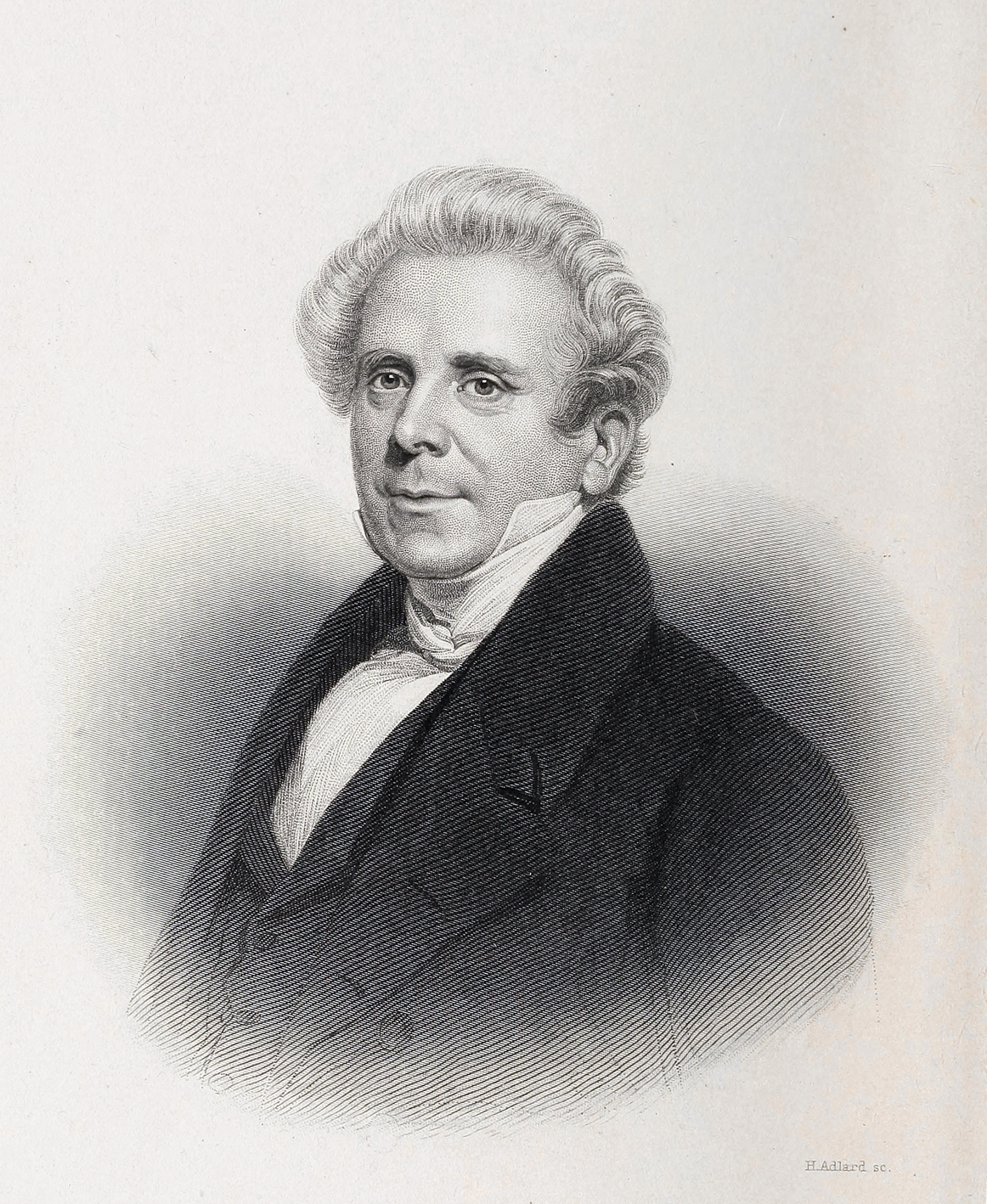
Ebenezer Henderson

Ebenezer Henderson (17 November 1784 – 17 May 1858) was a Scottish minister and missionary. He spent the early part of his life in Scandinavia, was an accomplished linguist and translator.

== Life ==
Born at the Linn near Dunfermline, Henderson was the youngest son of an agricultural labourer, and after three years schooling spent some time at watchmaking and as a shoemaker's apprentice. In 1803 he joined Robert Haldane's theological seminary, and in 1805 was selected to accompany the Rev. John Paterson to India; but - as the East India Company would not allow British vessels to convey missionaries to India - Henderson and his colleague went to Denmark to await the chance of a passage to Serampur, then a Danish port.

Being unexpectedly delayed, and having begun to preach in Copenhagen, they ultimately decided to settle in Denmark, supporting themselves through teaching English language classes. In 1806 Henderson became pastor at Elsinore. From this time until about 1817 he was engaged in encouraging the distribution of Bibles in the Scandinavian countries, and in the course of his labors he visited Sweden and Lapland (1807–1808), Iceland (1814–1815) and the mainland of Denmark and part of Germany (1816). During most of this time he was an agent of the British and Foreign Bible Society.

On 6 October 1811 he formed the first Congregational church in Sweden. In 1818, after a visit to England, he travelled in company with Paterson through Russia as far south as Tiflis, but, instead of settling as was proposed at Astrakhan, he retraced his steps, having resigned his connection with the Bible Society owing to his disapproval of a translation of the Scriptures, which had been made in Turkish.

In 1822 he was invited by Prince Alexander (Galitzin) to assist the Russian Bible Society in translating the Scriptures into various languages spoken in the Russian empire. After twenty years of foreign labour Henderson returned to England, and in 1825 was appointed tutor of the Mission College, Gosport.

In 1830 he succeeded Dr William Harrison as theological lecturer and professor of Oriental languages in Highbury Congregational College. In 1850, on the amalgamation of the colleges of Homerton, Coward and Highbury, he retired on a pension. From 1852 to 1853 he was pastor of Sheen Vale chapel at Mortlake.

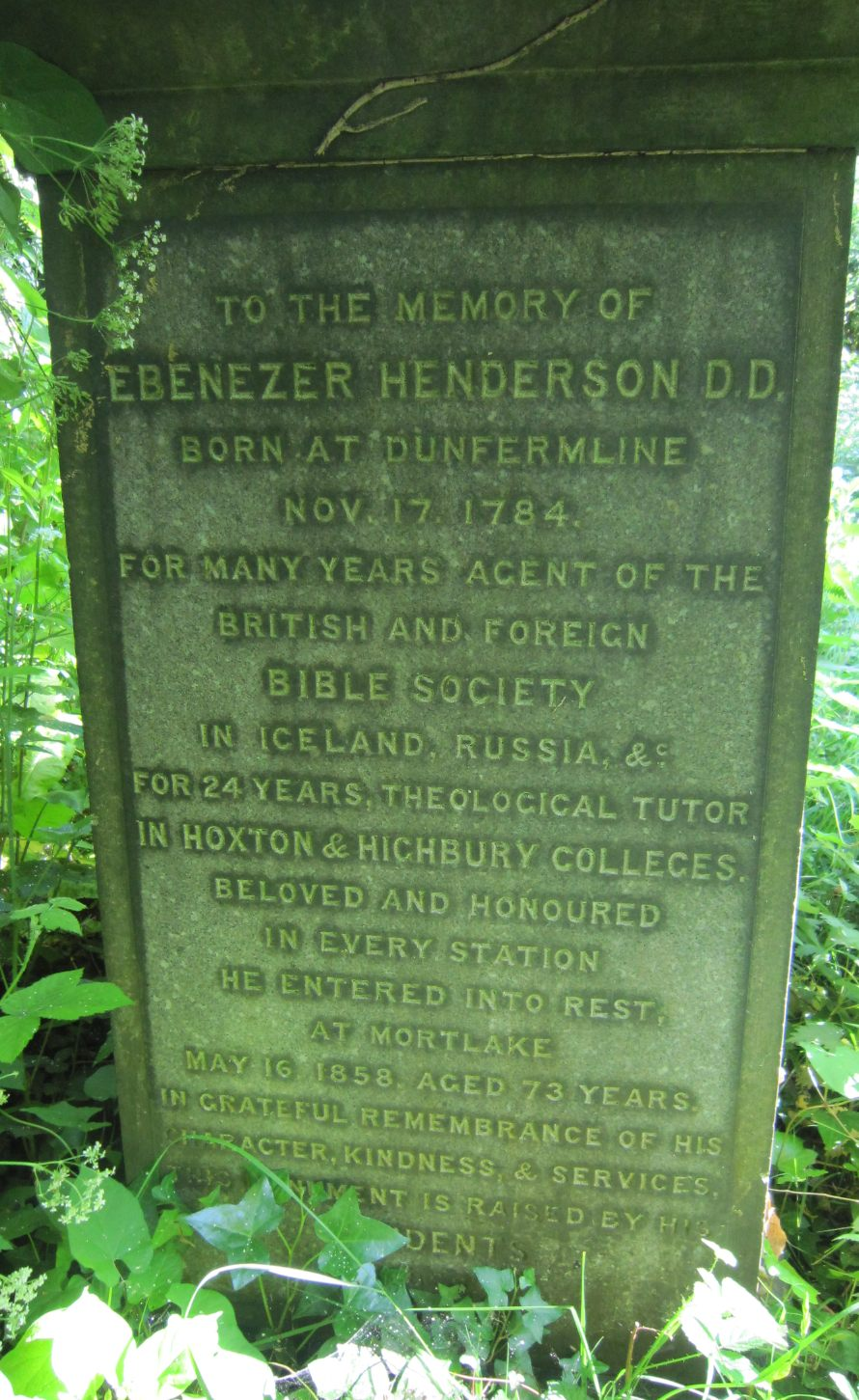
Memorial to Ebenezer Henderson at Abney Park Cemetery

Henderson was acquainted with Scandinavian languages, Hebrew, Syriac, Ethiopic, Russian, Arabic, Tatar, Persian, Turkish, Armenian, Manchu, Mongolian and Coptic. He organized the first Bible Society in Denmark (1814), and paved the way for several others. In 1817 he was nominated by the Scandinavian Literary Society a corresponding member; and in 1840 he was made DD by the university of Copenhagen. He was honorary secretary for life of the Religious Tract Society, and one of the first promoters of the British Society for the Propagation of the Gospel Among the Jews.

== Death ==
Henderson died at Mortlake. He is buried at Abney Park Cemetery in Stoke Newington, London, where his memorial records some of his achievements.

== Works ==
Henderson's main works are:

- Iceland, or the Journal of a Residence in that Island (2 vols, 1818)
- Biblical Researches and Travels in Russia (1826)
- Elements of Biblical Criticism and Interpretation (1830)
- The Great Mystery of Godliness Incontrovertible; Or, Sir Isaac Newton and the Socinians Foiled in the Attempt to Prove a Corruption in the Text, 1 Tim. III. 16 (1830)
- Divine Inspiration: Or, The Supernatural Influence Exerted in the Communication of Divine Truth and its Special Bearing Upon the Composition of the Sacred Scriptures (1836)
- The Vaudoir, a Tour of the Valleys of Piedmont (1845)
- The Book of the Prophet Ezekiel: Translated from the Original Hebrew; with a Commentary, Critical, Philological and Exegetical By Ebenezer Henderson (1855)
- The Book of the Prophet Jeremiah and that of the Lamentations Translated from the Original Hebrew, with a Commentary, Critical, Philological, and Exegetical By Ebenezer Henderson (1868)
- The Book of the Twelve Minor Prophets, Translated from the Original Hebrew With a Commentary, Critical, Philological, and Exegetical By Ebenezer Henderson (1868)
- A Theological Dictionary Containing Definitions of All Religious and Ecclesiastical Terms, with an Impartial Account of All the Principal Denominations which... By Charles Buck, Ebenezer Henderson (1833)
- The Conversion of the Jews: A Lecture, by Ebenezer Henderson (1840)

His last work was a translation of the Book of Isaiah (1857).

== See also ==
- Ebenezer Henderson (1809–1879), his nephew
