= Gissur Einarsson =

Icelandic bishop

Gissur Einarsson (c. 1512 – 24 March 1548; Modern Icelandic: [ˈcɪsːˌʏːr ˈeiːnˌar̥sˌsɔːn]) was a bishop in Skálholt from 1540 to his death, and the first Lutheran bishop in Iceland.

Gissur was the son of Einar Sigvaldason on Hraun í Landbroti and of Gunnhildur Jónsdóttir. He was the nephew of Halldóra Sigvaldadóttir. He attended Skálholt's school where he was instructed by bishop Ögmundur Pálsson and went to study further at Hamburg, where he discovered Protestantism. He was made a priest shortly after he came back to Iceland, and Ögmundur chose him as his successor in 1539. The king ratified this decision the following year, yet he was not formally made into bishop until 1542, in Copenhagen.

On October 7, 1543, Gissur married Katrín Hannessdóttir, sister of Eggert Hannesson.

Preceded by Ögmundur Pálsson	Bishop of Skálholt; 1540–1548	Succeeded by Marteinn Einarsson
