= Gísla saga =

Icelandic saga

Coordinates: 65.876829°N 23.635798°W

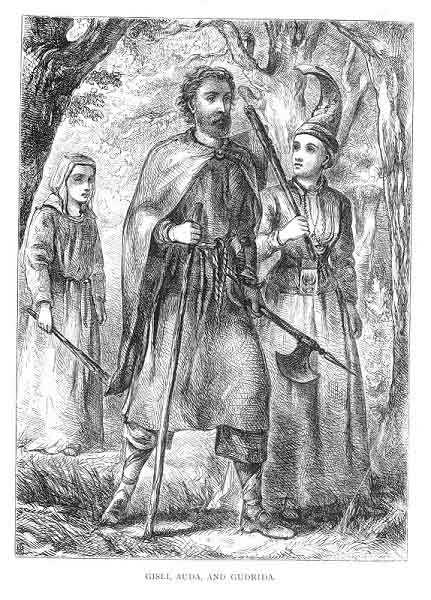
Gisli, wife Aud, and foster-daughter Gudrid. — Illustration by C. E. St. John Mildmay, in George Webbe Dasent's 1866 translation.

Gísla saga Súrssonar (Icelandic pronunciation: [ˈcistla ˈsaːɣa ˈsur̥sɔnar̥], The saga of Gísli the Outlaw) is one of the sagas of Icelanders. It tells the story of Gísli, a tragic hero who must kill one of his brothers-in-law to avenge another brother-in-law. Gisli is forced to stay on the run for thirteen years before he is hunted down and killed. The events depicted in the saga took place between 860 and 980.

== Manuscripts and dating ==
Gísla saga survives in thirty-three manuscripts and fragments from the Middle Ages down to the twentieth century. It is generally thought to have been composed in written form in the first half of the thirteenth century, but the earliest manuscript, the fragment Reykjavík, Stofnun Árna Magnússonar, AM 445 c I 4to, is from around 1400 and the earliest extensive text in AM 556a 4to, from the later fifteenth. The saga is generally thought to exist in three main versions originating in the Middle Ages:

- the 'fragmentary version' (attested by AM 445 c I 4to, often known in scholarship as version 'B' for 'brot' ['fragment'])
- the 'shorter version' (attested primarily in AM 556a 4to, Eggertsbók, often referred to in scholarship as 'E' for 'eldri' ['earlier'] or 'M' for 'minni' ['shorter'], and from which most other manuscripts seem to be descended)
- the 'longer version' (attested primarily in two eighteenth-century scholarly transcripts of a lost medieval manuscript known as the 'Membrana regia deperdita': AM 149 fol and Copenhagen, Det kongelige bibliotek, NKS 1181 fol. This version is often referred to as 'Y' for 'yngri' ['later'] or 'S' for 'større' ['longer']. Only two other manuscripts contain this version.).

The longer version differs from the shorter mainly in having a profoundly different (and longer) version of the opening sequence of the saga's narrative, set in Norway. The parts set in Iceland are substantially similar.

There is a consensus that the written archetype of Gísla saga was composed in the thirteenth century, with voices tending towards the middle of the century, and most commentators preferring 1225×50. However, there is little hard evidence to support this.

== Synopsis ==
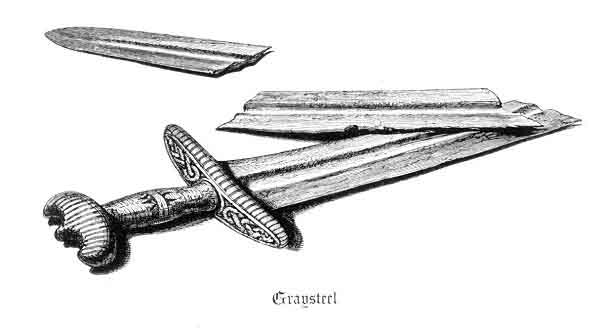
The broken sword Grásiða

Cursed heirloom sword

In the opening chapter set in Norway, Gisli Thorkelsson is an uncle and namesake of the saga's title character. This Gisli avenges his elder brother Ari, defeating a berserker with a sword of assured victory named Grásiða (Grey-blade, Grey-flank, Graysteel). But he refuses to return the sword borrowed from his wife's thrall Kol, and the ensuing squabble results in the death of both men and a broken sword. The thrall lays a curse against the family on this sword in the longer version.

Brothers’ feud in Norway

The estate at Surnadal then passes from (Ari and Gisli Thorkelsson) to Thorbjorn Thorkelsson Sur, whose son Gisli Sursson is the title hero.

Gisli and his elder brother Thorkel develop a strained relationship over whether to support Bard, a man seducing their elder sister Thordis. Gisli kills Bard, and Thorkel incites the dead man's relative Skeggi the Dueller (Hólmgang-Skeggi) to take revenge and stand as suitor for Thordis. The dueller challenges Kolbjorn who has become Thordis's new preferred suitor, but Gisli fights the duel instead and prevails over Skeggi who has a ringing sword named Gunnlogi (Battle-flame).

Even though Gisli spared the dueller's life, the dueller's sons forcibly recruit Kolbjorn, and the band sets fire to the hero's family house. Thorbjorn earns his nickname Súr ("Whey", "Soursop") by dousing fire using the whey in the stables. Gisli and Thorkel retaliate by exterminating the perpetrators.

Brothers divided again in Iceland

Around 952, the hero's family leave Norway and move to the Westfjords of Iceland. The siblings marry: Gisli marries Aud, sister of Vestein Vesteinsson; Thorkel marries a woman named Asgerd; and Thordis marries Thorgrim Thorsteinsson the Godi. They live as neighbors, the brothers at Hol, and Thorgrim at Saebol.

While attending a thing (an assembly), the hero's close-knit group learns that a wise man named Gest has predicted discord among them (the "Haukdal men") in three years. To forestall this, Gisli, Thorkel, Thorgrim (brother-in-law to both), and Vestein (Gisli's brothers-in-law) decide to enter a pact of blood brotherhood (Fóstbræðralag, "foster brotherhood"). However, Thorgrim has a change of heart and the pact is not completed. From this moment on the characters’ actions seem to be largely controlled by fate as they head down a tragic path.

A chain of dreadful events is set into motion when Thorkel is eavesdropping and overhears his wife Asgerd and Gisli's wife Aud talking about their past loves. Thorkel learns that his wife was actually fond of Vestein before she married. Gisli too learns from his wife that she had been fond of Thorgrim the Godi prior to marriage. Thorkel reacts to the news more badly than Gisli, and first lashes out at his wife by refusing to let her sleep in the same bed as him, which is immediately quashed by her who threatens him with divorce.

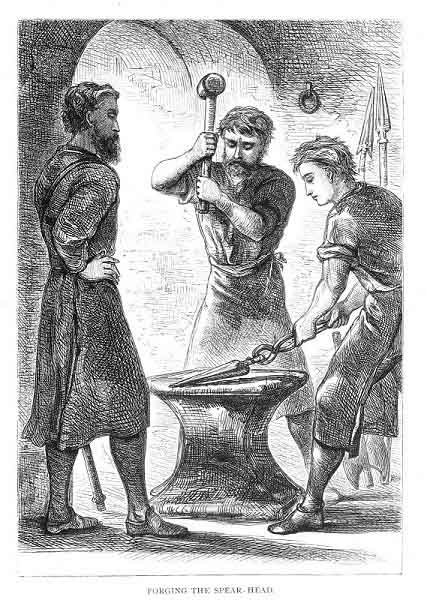
The Forging of the Spear

Thorkel then decides he must part company with his brother, and take up farming with Thorgrim, demanding a division of their assets. Thorkel will relinquish the land and farm, but will claim movable assets, including the broken heirloom sword Grásiða. Thorkel and Thorgrim have the sword reforged as a spear, with the assistance of a black magician and blacksmith named Thorgrim Nef (Nose, or Bottlenose). (Note: In Dasent's version, Thorgrim the Godi forges the spear, rather than "Thorgrim Bottlenose".)

Vestein's doom

Thorkel now in league with Thorgrim discuss various things, perhaps even planning Vestein's murder.

Vestein returns from abroad and is reported to be heading for Gisli's home. Gisli sends his farmhands to warn Vestein away, entrusting his messengers with a special coin he crafted as a token of dire danger. But Vestein refuses to heed the warning. Along the way Vestein meets more people who tell him to be on guard. At Saebol (Thorgrim and Thorkel's farm), the boy Geirmund tells him not to tarry and go straight to Gisli (this boy lived with Gisli and Thorkel, until the brothers split their assets). The boy refuses to admit seeing Vestein.

While lodging at the home of Gisli and Aud, Vestein is discovered stabbed to death by a spear. The saga states that the custom obligated the person who extracted the murder weapon to carry out vengeance, and Gisli takes the spear (Grásiða). (Note: Not explicitly identified as Grásiða here (Ch. 13), but later (Ch. 16) he is in possession of it and uses it in vengeance.) No witness saw the murderer, but Gisli has been haunted by dreams for several nights, and is convinced he knows the murderer. Gisli will later kill Thorgrim, but there are some psychological developments in the wake of Vestein's death.

Appearances of guilt

Gisli sent his foster daughter Gudrid (Geirmund's sister) to Saebol to see what was happening, and discovered that Thorgrim, Thorkel and the rest are fully armed, prepared for a fight. Thorkel commented on Vesteinn's death that there was a time when that would have been "regarded as news indeed". Thorkel also insisted on knowing if Aud is griefstricken, posing the question twice to Gisli; this has been analyzed as petty bit of schadenfreude on Thorkel's part.

Thorgrim on the other hand said in the girl Gudrid's presence that respect must be paid to Vestein's death, and in fact played the role of placing the "Hel-shoes" (helskór) onto Vestein's body to prepare it for interment in the burial mound. However, during the subsequent ball-games (knattleikr) in which he was bested by Gisli, he leered towards Vestein's mound and recited in verse that the sound of spear biting into the man caused him no anguish, which has been construed to be Thorgrim gloating over Vestein's death and taunting Gisli to take revenge if he dares.

Despite these innuendoes, it has been commented that shorter version of the saga does not make absolutely clear if Thorgrim had been the one who actually stabbed Vestein to death, even though he is definitely the culprit in the longer version. (Note: Anne Holtsmark advanced the theory that Thorkel was meant to be regarded as the real killer.)

Gisli kills Thorgrim

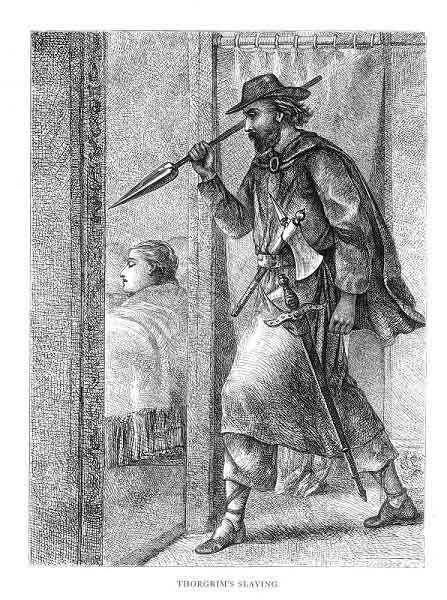
Gisli about to slay Thorgrim with Grásiða

In order to avenge the death of Vestein, a man to whom he is bound, Gisli murders Thorgrim and escapes into the night without being discovered. However, Thordis, Gisli’s widowed sister, suspects that Gisli must have murdered her husband, and tells her new husband, Thorgrim's brother Bork. Bork is persuaded to pursue a lawsuit of outlawry, rather than attempt to kill Gisli at once. Once Gisli is outlawed he constantly runs from a group of men who wish to find and murder him, led by Bork. This task proves to be more difficult than perceived, as they are unable to locate Gisli in his various hiding places. While Gisli is on the run, Vestein's two sons decide to seek their own vengeance for their father's murder. The two boys murder Thorkel. Both Bork and Gisli wish to avenge the death, but others, relatives of Vestein such as Gisli's wife Aud, discourage it and nothing is done. Gisli says that it is just as well that he has not met nor will ever meet the lads. The lads' fates are mentioned on the last page of the saga.

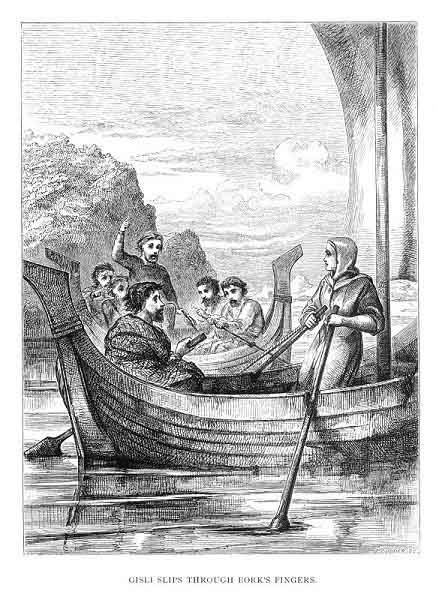
Gisli slips through Bork's fingers.

Aud, Gisli’s wife, remains loyal throughout the saga and refuses to divulge the location of her husband, even when Eyjolf offers her three hundred silver pieces, help in remarriage and reminds her of her current hard life at Geirthjofsfjordhur. Gisli's dreams of a mysterious woman pouring blood on him continue to plague him, and eventually he is not able to run from his problems or the people who are hunting him. After Gisli is discovered, Aud and their foster-daughter Gudrid fight side-by-side with Gisli until he is killed in a final, strenuous battle. Even after Gisli is dead, he is still honoured and respected for being a loyal and honest man. The saga notes that his final blow was just as strong as his first. Once Gisli faces his death, Thordis experiences remorse for his murder and stabs Eyjolf in the leg. After Bork wrenches the sword out of her hand and attempts to calm the group, Thordis declares herself divorced from Bork and leaves the house. Aud, Vestein's sons, and three others leave Iceland. Aud converts to the Christian faith and with Gunhillda, the widow of Vestein, takes a pilgrimage to Rome, never to return to Iceland.

== Themes ==
Gísla saga is a classic outlaw saga that is centered on the internal struggles of Gisli. As Gisli's fate unfolds, he experiences conflicting passions of love, hate, and complex emotional bonds. Differing from the typical family saga, it uses the common theme of vengeance to divide loyalties within family instead of strengthening familial bonds. More than most sagas, Gísla saga makes use of motifs from the Eddaic poems, in particular by referring to Guðrún Gjúkadóttir to represent old ways of vengeance and family honor.

In contrast to the heroic Gisli is his elder brother Thorkel, one of whose major flaws is pointed out to be that of laziness. When the brothers divide their property Thorkel concedes that he is making Gisli perform all the work of running the farm., and when Thorkel eavesdrops on his wife, this is because he was lazily warming himself at the house while everyone else was laboring hard during the busiest time at the farm. The longer version explicitly calls Thorkel lazy, and adds he is a dandy preoccupied more with fashionable attire than labor.

== Popular culture ==
Gísla saga served as inspiration for both Maurice Hewlett's novel The Outlaw (1919) and Kári Gíslason's The Sorrow Stone (2022). The saga was also adapted to film by Ágúst Guðmundsson in his Útlaginn (1981).
