= Ögmundur Pálsson =

Roman Catholic bishop

Ögmundur Pálsson, O.E.S.A. (c. 1475 – 13 July 1541; Modern Icelandic: [ˈœɣˌmʏntʏr ˈpʰaulsˌsɔːn]) was an Icelandic Roman Catholic prelate, who was the last Catholic bishop of the Icelandic diocese of Skálholt, from 1521 until 1540.

He was the son of Páll Guðmundsson and Margrét Ögmundardóttir. Served as Abbot in Augustinian Abbey in Viðey from 1515 to 1519. And in 1519 was elected as bishop and consecrated in 1521 in Trondheim.

He died on his way to Denmark.

== See also ==
- List of Skálholt bishops

Catholic Church titles
Preceded by Stefán Jónsson	Bishop of Skálholt; 1521–1540	Succeeded by suppressed
