= 1550 =

1550 in various calendars
- Gregorian calendar: 1550; MDL
- Ab urbe condita: 2303
- Armenian calendar: 999; ԹՎ ՋՂԹ
- Assyrian calendar: 6300
- Balinese saka calendar: 1471–1472
- Bengali calendar: 956–957
- Berber calendar: 2500
- English Regnal year: 3 Edw. 6 – 4 Edw. 6
- Buddhist calendar: 2094
- Burmese calendar: 912
- Byzantine calendar: 7058–7059
- Chinese calendar: 己酉年 (Earth Rooster); 4247 or 4040 — to — 庚戌年 (Metal Dog); 4248 or 4041
- Coptic calendar: 1266–1267
- Discordian calendar: 2716
- Ethiopian calendar: 1542–1543
- Hebrew calendar: 5310–5311
- Hindu calendars
- Vikram Samvat: 1606–1607
- Shaka Samvat: 1471–1472
- Kali Yuga: 4650–4651
- Holocene calendar: 11550
- Igbo calendar: 550–551
- Iranian calendar: 928–929
- Islamic calendar: 956–957
- Japanese calendar: Tenbun 19 (天文１９年)
- Javanese calendar: 1468–1469
- Julian calendar: 1550; MDL
- Korean calendar: 3883
- Minguo calendar: 362 before ROC 民前362年
- Nanakshahi calendar: 82
- Thai solar calendar: 2092–2093
- Tibetan calendar: ས་མོ་བྱ་ལོ་ (female Earth-Bird); 1676 or 1295 or 523 — to — ལྕགས་ཕོ་ཁྱི་ལོ་ (male Iron-Dog); 1677 or 1296 or 524

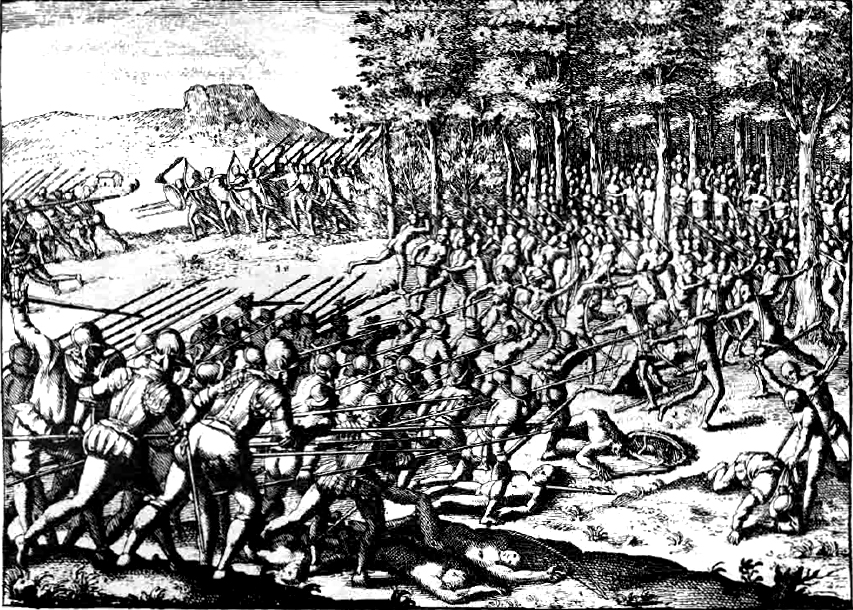
March 12: The Battle of Penco takes place in Chile between the armies of Spain and of the indigenous Mapuche people.

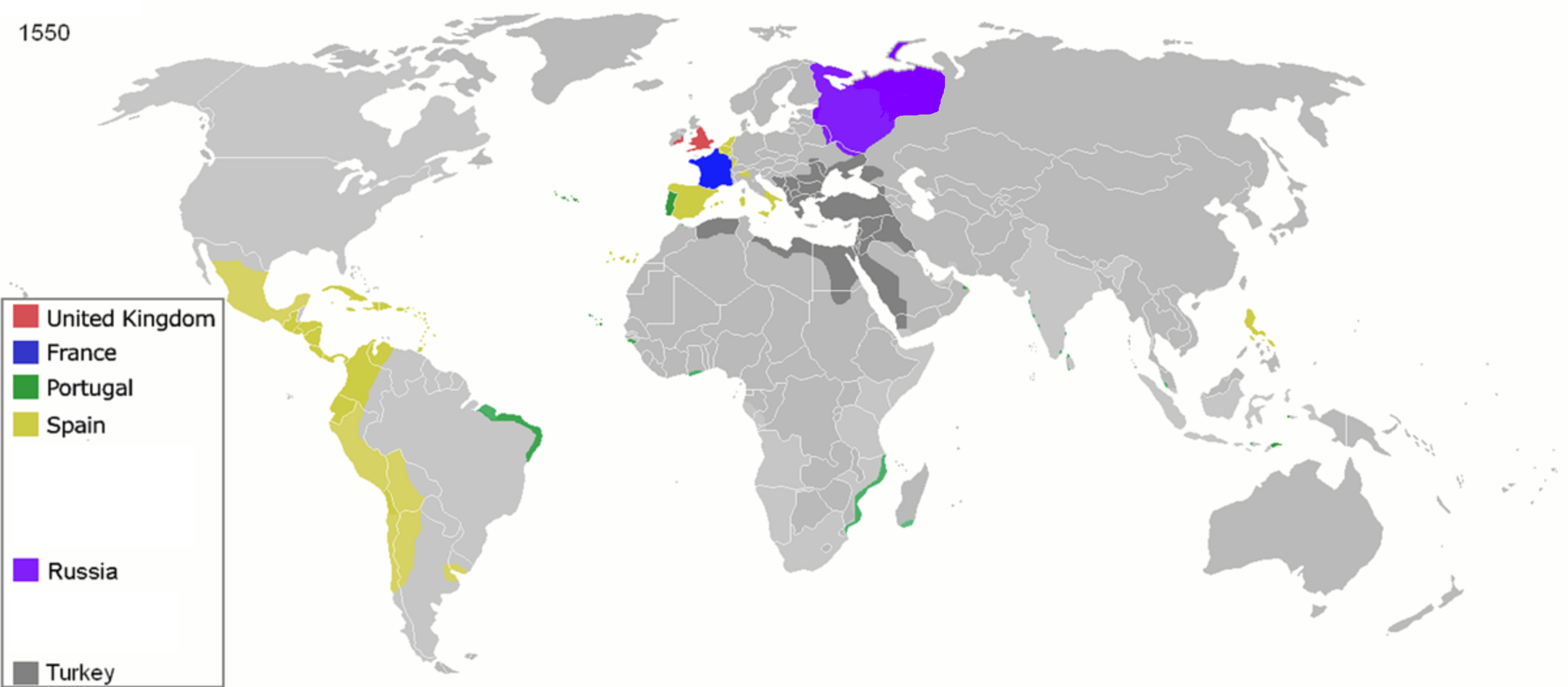
Colonisation of the New World in 1550

Year 1550 (MDL) was a common year starting on Wednesday of the Julian calendar.

== Events ==
=== January–March ===
- January 6 – Spanish Captain Hernando de Santana founds the city of Valledupar, in modern-day Colombia.
- February 7 – After a 10-week conclave in Rome to elect a new Pope, Giovanni Maria Ciocchi del Monte, Bishop of Palestrina, is selected on the 61st ballot after Reginald Pole of England falls two votes short of winning. Ciocchi del Monte takes the name Pope Julius III and is crowned the next day, succeeding the late Pope Paul III.
- February 25 – (10th day of 2nd month of Tenbun 19) In Oita, Ōita Prefecture, an attack within the Ōtomo clan of Japanese samurai takes place after clan leader Ōtomo Yoshikazu seeks to disinherit his oldest son and to make his third son, Ōtomo Shioichimaru, as his designated successor. Supporters of the oldest son, Ōtomo Yoshishige, invade Yoshikazu's home and kill Shioichimaru and four other family members.
- March 12
  - Arauco War: Battle of Penco – Several hundred Spanish and indigenous troops under the command of Pedro de Valdivia defeat an army of 60,000 Mapuche in modern-day Chile.
  - Acapulco is founded by 30 families sent from Mexico City.
- March 24 – "Rough Wooing": England and France sign the Treaty of Boulogne, by which England withdraws from Boulogne in France and returns territorial gains in Scotland.
- March 29 – Sherborne School in England is refounded by King Edward VI.

=== April–June ===
- April 16 – The Valladolid debate on the rights and treatment of indigenous peoples of the Americas by their Spanish conquerors opens at the Colegio de San Gregorio in Valladolid, Castile.
- April 30 – King Tabinshwehti of Burma is assassinated by two of his bodyguards while he is on a hunting trip. The two swordsmen, sent by Smim Sawhtut, Governor of Sittaung, behead the King, and a civil war begins as major governors rebel against the new Burmese King Bayinnaung.
- May 6 – Italian Protestant Michelangelo Florio, jailed since 1548 before being brought to trial for and sentenced to death for heresy, escapes from prison and is able flee to France.
- May 15 – The vestments controversy is resolved in the Church of England with a compromise on the style of clothing worn by Anglican priests. John Hopper is allowed ordination as the Bishop of Gloucester without being required to wear Anglican vestments, but must not forbid anyone in his bishopric from wearing the vestments if they wish.
- May 20 – The Spanish Catalan city of Cullera is plundered by the Ottoman Empire General Dragut Reis, and most of its inhabitants are sold into slavery in Algeria.
- June 12 – The city of Helsinki (now in Finland but known as Helsingfors in Sweden at this time) is founded by King Gustav I of Sweden.
- June 28 – Capture of Mahdia (1550): The Spanish Armada arrives in North Africa to begin the process of capturing the fortress of Mahdia (now in Tunisia) from control of the Ottoman Empire.

=== July–September ===
- July 21 – The Society of Jesus (Jesuits) is approved by Pope Julius III.
- July 25 – Capture of Mahdia (1550): Troops commanded by Ottoman General Turgut Reis make a counterattack on the Spanish invaders, led by General Andrea Doria. Both sides sustain heavy losses, and the Spanish succeed in forcing the Ottomans to retreat inside Mahdia.
- August 5 – The University of Santa Catalina is authorized in Spain by a canonical bull from Pope Julius III.
- September 2 (5th waning of Tawthalin 912 ME) – King Bayinnaung of Burma begins a four-month siege of the former Burmese capital, Toungoo, occupied by the king's rebellious brother Minkhaung.
- September 10 – Spanish troops, commanded by Genoa's General Andrea Doria, capture the Tunisian fortress of Mahdia from the Ottoman Empire after fighting that began on June 28.

=== October–December ===
- October 2 – Battle of Sauðafell in Iceland: Daði Guðmundsson of Snóksdalur defeats the forces of Catholic Bishop Jón Arason, resulting in Iceland becoming fully Protestant. Arason is captured; he is executed, along with his two sons, on November 7.
- October 16 – Altan Khan crosses the Great Wall of China and besieges Beijing, burning the suburbs.
- November 25 – Luis de Velasco becomes the second Viceroy of New Spain, which encompasses all Spanish territory in North America and Central America. Velasco succeeds Antonio de Mendoza, the first Viceroy, who has been ordered to become the Viceroy of Peru.
- December 29 – Bhuvanaikabahu VII, King of Kotte on most of the island of Sri Lanka, is assassinated by a gunman hired by the government of Portuguese India.

=== Date unknown ===
- The summit level canal between the Alster and the Trave in Germany ceases to be navigable.
- The first grammatical description of the French language is published by Louis Maigret.
- The first book in Slovene, Catechismus, written by Protestant reformer Primož Trubar, is printed in Schwäbisch Hall, Holy Roman Empire.
- Nostradamus' first almanac is written.
- Approximate date – The discovery of silver at Guanajuato in Mexico stimulates silver rushes.

== Births ==
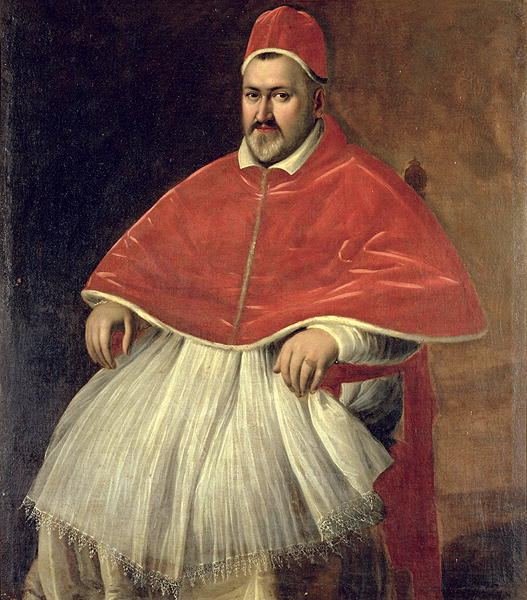
Pope Paul V

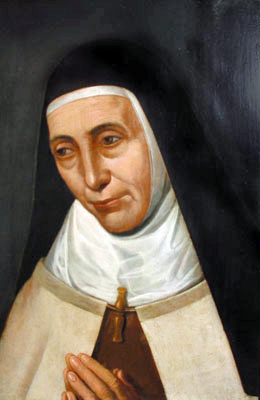
Anne of Saint Bartholomew

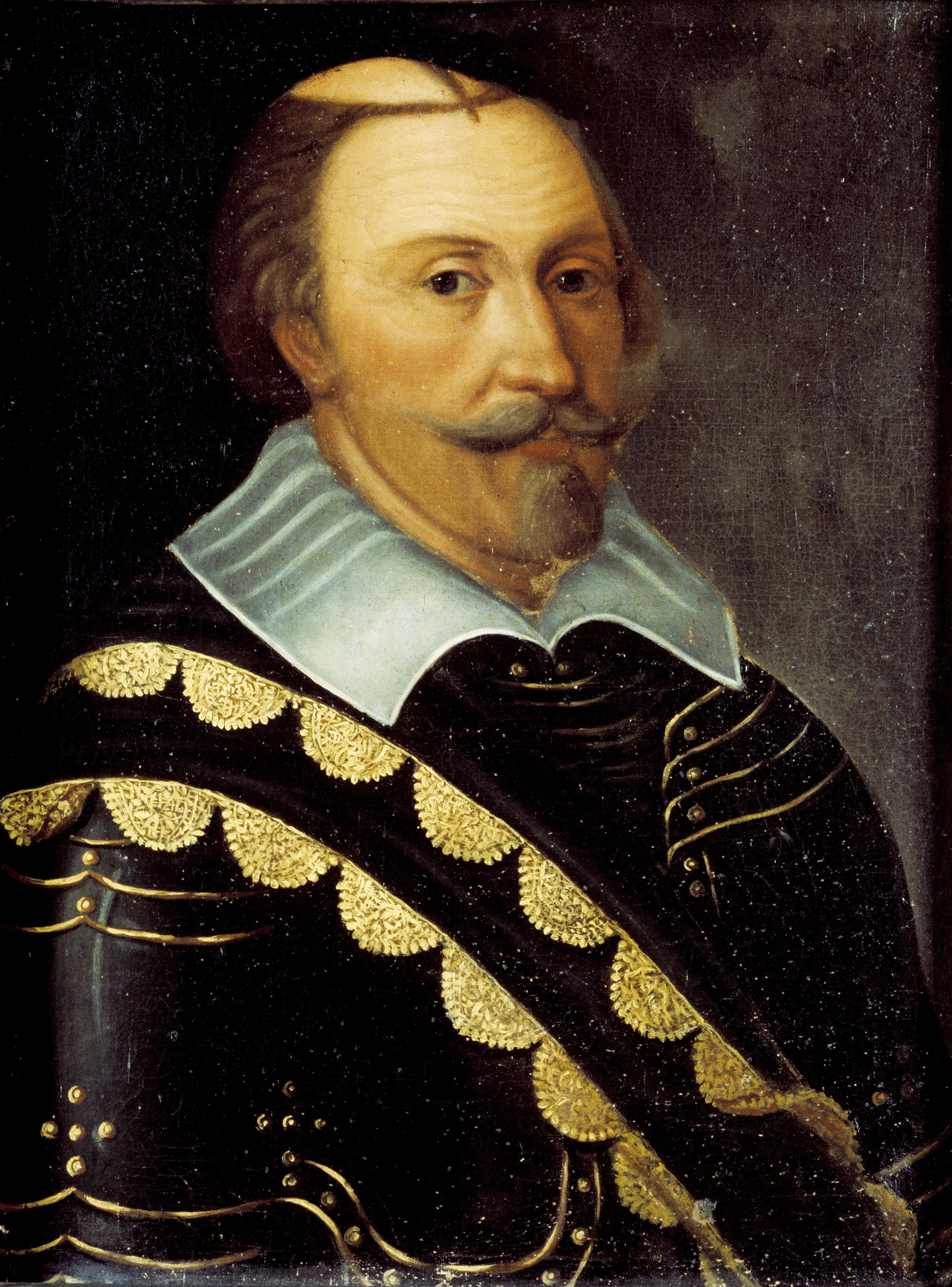
King Charles IX of Sweden

- January 18 – Tsugaru Tamenobu, Japanese daimyō (d. 1607)
- February 1 John Napier, Scottish mathematician (d. 1617)
- February 17 – Philip of Hohenlohe-Neuenstein, Dutch army commander (d. 1606)
- February 22 – Charles de Ligne, 2nd Prince of Arenberg (d. 1616)
- March 6 – Michelangelo Naccherino, Italian sculptor (d. 1622)
- March 8 – William Drury, English politician (d. 1590)
- April 5 – Andrés Pacheco, Spanish churchman and theologian (d. 1626)
- April 9 – Giulio Pace, Italian philosopher (d. 1635)
- April 12 – Edward de Vere, 17th Earl of Oxford, Lord Great Chamberlain of England (d. 1604)
- April 16 – Francis Anthony, English apothecary and physician (d. 1623)
- April 18 – Alessandro Pieroni, Italian painter (d. 1607)
- May 8 – John I, Count Palatine of Zweibrücken (d. 1604)
- May 25 – Camillus de Lellis, Italian saint and nurse (d. 1614)
- June 16 – Marie Eleonore of Cleves, Duchess consort of Prussia (1573–1608) (d. 1608)
- June 27 – King Charles IX of France (d. 1574)
- June 28 – Johannes van den Driesche, Flemish Protestant clergyman and scholar (d. 1616)
- July 3 – Jacobus Gallus, Slovenian composer (d. 1591)
- August 6 – Enrico Caetani, Italian Catholic cardinal (d. 1599)
- August 8 – Petrus Gudelinus, Belgian jurist (d. 1619)
- September 10 – Alonso de Guzmán El Bueno, 7th Duke of Medina Sidonia, commander of the Spanish Armada (d. 1615)
- September 17 – Pope Paul V (d. 1621)
- September 29 – Joachim Frederick of Brieg, Duke of Wołów (1586–1602) (d. 1602)
- September 30 – Michael Maestlin, German astronomer and mathematician (d. 1631)
- October 1 – Anne of Saint Bartholomew, Spanish Discalced Carmelite nun (d. 1626)
- October 4 – King Charles IX of Sweden (d. 1611)
- October 8 – Antonio Zapata y Cisneros, Spanish cardinal (d. 1635)
- October 25 – Ralph Sherwin, English Roman Catholic priest (martyred 1581)
- October 28 – Stanislaus Kostka, Polish saint (d. 1568)
- November 1 – Henry of Saxe-Lauenburg, Prince-Archbishop of Bremen, Prince-Bishop of Osnabruck and Paderborn (d. 1585)
- November 6 – Karin Månsdotter, Swedish queen (d. 1612)
- December 2 – Antonio Fernández de Córdoba y Cardona, Spanish diplomat (d. 1606)
- December 6 – Orazio Vecchi, Italian composer (d. 1605)
- December 7 – Lithuanian noble Barbara Radziwiłł, wife of Sigismund II Augustus, King of Poland and Duke of Lithuania since 1547, has an elaborate coronation in Kraków as Queen consort and Grand Duchess, five months before her death at the age of 30.
- December 21
  - Aegidius Hunnius, German theologian (d. 1603)
  - Man Singh I, Mughal noble (d. 1614)
- December 22 – Cesare Cremonini, Italian philosopher (d. 1631)
- December 28 – Vicente Espinel, Spanish writer (d. 1624)
- December 28 – Abu al-Abbas Ahmad III, the Sultan of Ifriqiya (now Tunisia), signs a six-year treaty with Spain.
- December 29 – García de Silva Figueroa, Spanish diplomat and traveller (d. 1624)
- December 31 – Henri I, Duke of Guise (d. 1588)
- date unknown
  - Jacob ben Isaac Ashkenazi, Polish Jewish author (d. 1625)
  - Willem Barentsz, Dutch navigator and explorer (d. 1597)
  - Anselmus de Boodt, Belgian mineralogist and physician (d. 1632)
  - Matthijs Bril, Flemish painter (d. 1583)
  - Helena Antonia, Austrian court dwarf (d. 1595)
  - Sarsa Dengel, Emperor of Ethiopia (d. 1597)
  - Hugh O'Neill, Earl of Tyrone, Irish rebel (d. 1616)
- probable
  - Robert Balfour, Scottish philosopher (d. 1625)
  - Henry Barrowe, English Puritan and Separatist (d. 1593)
  - Emilio de' Cavalieri, Italian composer (d. 1602)
  - Cornelis Corneliszoon, Dutch inventor of the sawmill (d. c. 1600)
  - Philip Henslowe, English theatrical entrepreneur (d. 1616)
  - Brianda Pereira, Azorean Portuguese heroine (d. 1620)

== Deaths ==
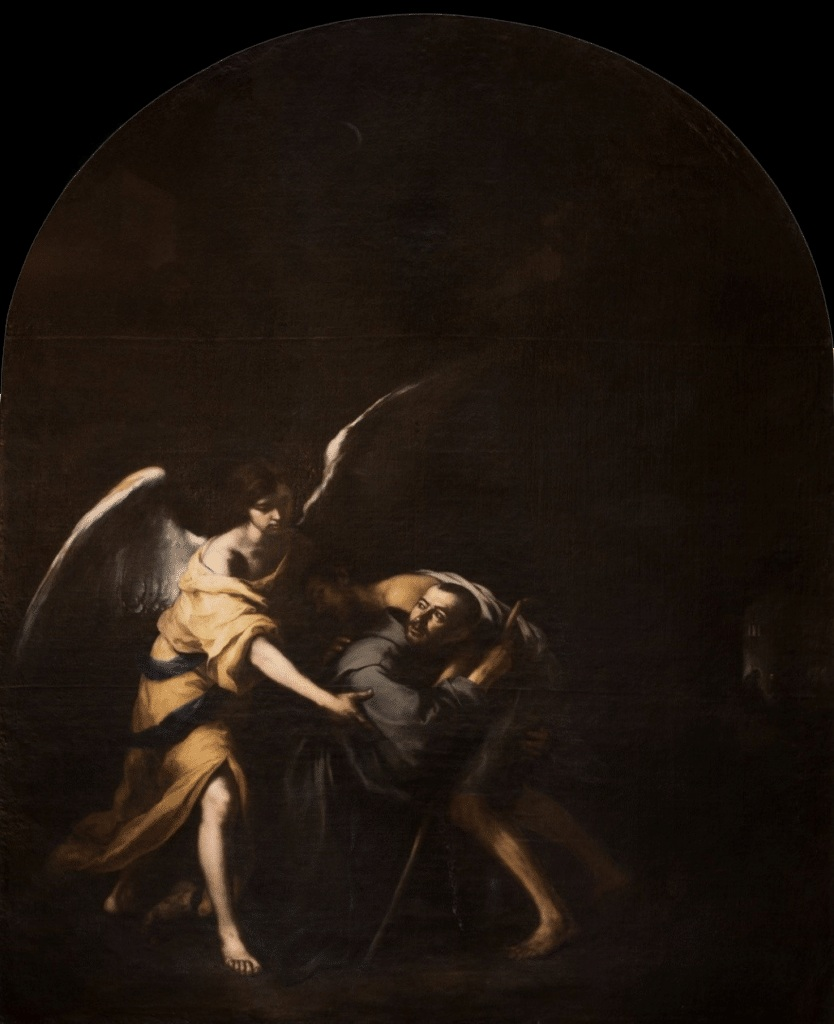
Saint John of God

- January 12 – Andrea Alciato, Italian jurist and writer (b. 1492)
- January 22 – Jamsheed Quli Qutb Shah, second ruler of Golconda
- January 28 – Magnus III of Mecklenburg-Schwerin, Lutheran administrator of the Prince-Bishopric of Schwerin (b. 1509)
- February 22 – Francesco III Gonzaga, Duke of Mantua (b. 1533)
- March 7 – William IV of Bavaria (b. 1493)
- March 8 – John of God, Spanish friar and saint (b. 1495)
- April 12 – Claude, Duke of Guise, French soldier (b. 1496)
- April 13 – Innocenzo Cybo, Italian Catholic cardinal (b. 1491)
- April 30 – King Tabinshwehti of Burma (b. 1516)
- May 18 – Jean, Cardinal of Lorraine, French churchman (b. 1498)
- May 20 – Ashikaga Yoshiharu, Japanese shōgun (b. 1511)
- June 13 – Veronica Gambara, Italian poet (b. 1485)
- July 19 (probable date) – Jacopo Bonfadio, Italian historian, executed (b. c. 1508)
- July 22 – Jorge de Lencastre, Duke of Coimbra (b. 1481)
- July 30 – Thomas Wriothesley, 1st Earl of Southampton, English politician (b. 1505)
- August 18 – Antonio Ferramolino, Italian architect and military engineer
- October 20 – Ferdinand, Duke of Calabria (b. 1488)
- October 23 – Tiedemann Giese, Polish Catholic bishop (b. 1480)
- October 24 – Louis of Valois, French prince (b. 1549)
- October 26 – Samuel Maciejowski, Polish Catholic bishop (b. 1499)
- November 6 – Ulrich, Duke of Württemberg (b. 1487)
- November 7 – Jón Arason, last Catholic bishop of Iceland (b. 1484)
- December 6 – Pieter Coecke van Aelst, Flemish painter (b. 1502)
- December 8 – Gian Giorgio Trissino, Italian humanist, poet, dramatist and diplomat (b. 1478)
- December 29 – Bhuvanaikabahu VII, King of Kotte (b. 1468)
- date unknown – Aq Kubek of Astrakhan, ruler of Astrakhan Khanate
