= Einar Snorrason Ölduhryggjarskáld =

Icelandic poet

Einar Snorrason
- Born: Miklaholtshrepur, Iceland
- Died: 1538
- Other name: Einar Ölduhryggjarskáld
- Occupations: Priest, poet

Einar Snorrason (died 1538), called Einar Ölduhryggjarskáld (lit. 'Einar the Moraine Poet'), was a 16th-century Icelandic priest and poet whose family played a significant role in the Icelandic Reformation.

Although definitive records do not exist, Einar is believed to be the son of a farmer, Snorra Sveinssonar, and born in Miklaholtshrepur in northwest Iceland. It is recorded that in 1497 Einar was ordained as a priest and settled at Stað á Ölduhrygg. He became a well known enough poet for Bishop Jón Arason to refer to him the greatest living poet in the west of Iceland, however none of his work remains. (Note: Icelandic: Öld segir afbragð skálda // Einar prest fyrir vestan. People say the greatest of poets // is priest Einar from the west. lit. 'People call the Reverend Einar to the west the paragon of poets.')

Einar's companion was Guðrún Oddsdóttir, the niece of Sveinn spaki Pétursson, the Bishop of Skálholt. Their sons were Pétur and Brandur Einarsson, known as Gleraugna-Pétur and Moldar-Brandur respectively; both became sheriffs. He also had at least two children with Ingiríði Jónsdóttur, a sister of Bishop Stefán Jónsson. Their son, Marteinn Einarsson, became the second Lutheran bishop of Iceland, while their daughter, Guðrún, married wealthy landowner Daði Guðmundsson.

Einar's sons and son-in-law all clashed with Catholic Bishop Jón Arason during the Icelandic Reformation, culminating with Daði capturing Jón and his sons at the Battle of Sauðafell.
