= Marteinn Einarsson =

Icelandic bishop

’Marteinn Einarsson (died 7 October 1576) was bishop of Skálholt from 1548 to 1556. He was the second Lutheran bishop and was directly involved in the Icelandic Reformation.

== Early life ==
Marteinn was born in Staðarstaður on the Snæfellsnes peninsula to the poet Einar Ölduhryggjarskáld and Ingiríður Jónsdóttir. Marteinn's family had a tradition of serving as priests. His father, Einar, was a priest in Staðarstaður from about 1500 until his death in 1538, and Ingiríður's brother, Stefán Jónsson, had served as bishop of Skálholt from 1491 to 1518. Marteinn's siblings included the sýslumenn Pétur and Brandur Einarsson, known as Gleraugna-Pétur and Moldar-Brandur respectively, as well as a sister, Guðrún, the wife of the magistrate Daði Guðmundsson.

Marteinn spent nine years studying in England, where another of his sisters lived after marrying an Englishman, before returning to Iceland to work as a merchant in Grindavík.

== Bishop ==
In 1533, Marteinn became a priest, serving in Staðarstaður after his father's death. He was an early supporter of the Reformation, and in 1548, Marteinn was elected bishop of Skálholt after the death of Gissur Einarsson, the first Lutheran bishop in Iceland. Despite an effort by the Catholic bishop Jón Arason, the primary opponent of the spread of Protestantism in Iceland, to have Sigvarður Halldórsson named bishop instead, Marteinn was consecrated in Denmark as bishop of Skálholt on 7 April 1549.

Upon his return to Iceland that summer, Marteinn was arrested by Jón's sons, Ara and Björn Jónsson, who detained him at Ara's farm at Möðrufell. Marteinn remained detained until after the Battle of Sauðafell in 1550, where Daði Guðmundsson defeated Jón Arason, ending organized Catholic resistance to the Reformation, at which time he formally took control of the bishopric of Skálholt.

In 1555, Marteinn published the first Icelandic hymnal, Lítið Psálmakver. Marteinn served as bishop until 1557, when he resigned in protest of claims by the king decision to appropriate church tithes. He returned to Staðarstaður where he served as a priest until his retirement in 1569.

== Personal life ==
Marteinn was married to Ingibjörg, whose father's name is unknown. They had four sons and two daughters. Marteinn lived out his retirement in Álftanes á Mýrum where he published a collection of psalms and was considered a good painter, although none of his paintings are known to survive. He died in 1576.

== Fiction ==
Marteinn appears in Ólafur Gunnarsson's 2003 historical novel Öxin og jörðin (translated into English as The Ax and the Earth), which is set amid Jón Arason's struggle against the Icelandic Reformation.

Preceded by Gissur Einarsson	Bishop of Skálholt; 1548–1556	Succeeded by Gísli Jónsson
