= Anna Vigfúsdóttir á Stóru-Borg =

16th-century Icelandic noblewoman

Anna Vigfúsdóttir
- Other name: Anna á Stóra-Borg
- Occupation: Landowner
- Known for: Relationship with Hjalti Magnússon
- Spouse: Hjalti Magnússon
- Children: 8, including Magnús Hjaltason
- Parent(s): Vigfús Erlendsson, Guðrún Jónsdóttir
- Relatives: Páll Vigfússon (brother), Guðríður Vigfúsdóttir (sister), Kristín Vigfúsdóttir (sister)

Anna Vigfúsdóttir (died c. 1571), known as Anna of Stóra-Borg (Anna á Stóra-Borg) or Anna from Stóraborg (Anna frá Stóruborg) was an Icelandic noblewoman in the 16th century. She was famous for her love with the shepherd Hjalti Magnusson and her long feud with her brother, the lawyer Páll, who tried to prevent them from marrying. Anna and Hjalti's story is the subject of the 1914 novel Anna frá Stóruborg by Jón Trausti.

== Family ==
Anna was from one of Iceland's most aristocratic families. Her father was Vigfús Erlendsson, a lawyer and the seneschal of Hlíðarendi in Fljótshlíð, and whose great-grandfather was Loftur ríki (the rich) Guttormsson. Anna's mother was Guðrún, the illegitimate daughter of Páll Jónsson, sýslumaður of Skarð, and therefore a close relative of Björn Guðnason of Ögur as well as many other wealthy Icelanders.

Anna's brother was Páll Vigfússon, a lawyer. Her sister Guðríður married Sæmundur ríki ("the rich") Eiríksson of Ás in Holta- og Landsveit, one of the richest chieftains of southern Iceland. Her sister Kristín became the mistress of Reverend Magnús of Grenjaðarstaður, the son of Bishop Jón Arason.

== Anna and Hjalti's relationship ==
Anna, who was said to have been proud and spirited, built a farmstead at the base of Eyjafjöll mountain across from Stóra-Borg (also called Stóruborg), which she had inherited along with many other assets after her father died in 1521, where she lived alone. Allegedly, many wealthy men had asked to marry her, but she rejected them all.

Hjalti Magnússon was from a poor family and sources say that he had been a young shepherd in Stóra-Borg. The story goes that, one time he returned home with the sheep, cold and wet, while the farmhands were out haymaking. The farmhands dared him to demonstrate his manliness by going to the bed of the woman of the house in his current state and they promised him a reward for doing it. He then went to the house and told Anna everything. She invited him into her bed and called the farmhands to show them, demanding that they make good on their dare and pay Hjalti. Hjalti frequently stayed the night in her bed from then on and Anna soon became pregnant. She had many children with Hjalti, who was nicknamed Barna-Hjalti, which literally translates as "children-Hjalti," suggesting he was known for his large brood of children.

According to the novel by Jón Trausti, Hjlati was a youth of 15 years old while Anna was around 30 when their relationship began, but there are no sources attesting to such a large age difference.

=== Conflict with Páll Vigfússon ===
Anna's brother, the lawyer Páll Vigfússon, was a straight-laced man and tried to reprimand his sister and separate her from Hjalti. When that did not succeed, he tried to arrest Hjalti to have him killed. Hjalti is said to have been a strong man and very athletic, characteristics that would have served him well in attempts to evade Páll. At first, Anna hid Hjalti in Skiphellir, a cave near Stóra-Borg, and he went there whenever there was a risk of Páll showing up. One time, Páll arrived unexpectedly, and it is said that Anna hid Hjalti in her clothing chest.

Ultimately, Anna did not consider Skiphellir to be a good enough hiding place and, with help from the residents of nearby farms, she was able to get the farmer in Fit at the foot of Eyjafjöll, to hide Hjalti in Fitjarhellir, which is now called Paradísarhellir (Paradise Cave), where he stayed for years on end, although he did stay in Stóra-Borg with Anna and their children when it was safe.

=== Reconciliation ===
Hjalti was a man of valor and it is said that he had once rescued Páll when he fell off his horse in the Markarfljót river when it was running high. He saved Páll then dashed off before he was able to realize who was responsible. After that, Páll is supposed to have relented. It is also said that Anna had sent her adolescent sons to Páll to ask him to reconcile with Hjalti. What is known for certain is that eventually, Páll saw to it that they would be able to marry, under the condition that they had paid a fine for having their eight children. It is uncertain when this took place, but it would have been a little before the 1568 Stóridómur. Later on, Anna and Hjalti lived in Teigur, a farmstead in Fljótshlíð. They were both still alive in 1570 but, by 1572, Anna had died.

Páll died without children in 1569 and the children of his sisters, Guðríður and Anna, inherited his assets. Árni Gíslason, sýslumaður of Hlíðarendi, was married to Guðrídur's only daughter and contested the right of Hjalti and Anna's children to inherit. However, in 1571, the Alþingi's ruled that, seeing that Páll had recognized their marriage and that they had paid the fines for their children in full, the children were to be considered eligible to inherit according to the old laws, which differed from the laws adopted under Stóridómur.

Anna and Hjalti had many descendants, and the most well known of them was Magnús Hjaltason, a lawyer in Teigur, who is often mentioned in judgments and sources from the last quarter of the 16th century until 1609.

== The Jón Trausti novel ==
In 1914, the author Jón Trausti published the novel Anna frá Stóruborg (Anna from Stóraborg), which is based on sources and accounts about the lives of Anna and Hjalti, their love, and the conflict with Páll.
