= Loftur Þorsteinsson =

Loftur Þorsteinsson (born 1702 – fl. 1722) was an Icelander known as Galdra-Loftur for his supposed mastery of Old Norse sorcery (galdr). He was the subject of many folk sagas about his alleged magical performances.

Loftur was born near Hvammsfjörður in the northwest of Iceland. His father, Þorsteinn Jónsson, was a falconer at Vörðufell, and his mother was Ásta Loftsdóttir. In 1716, Loftur became a student at the Latin school at Hólar. During his time there, he developed an interest in galdr. According to legend, Loftur tried (and failed) to obtain the legendary grimoire (book of spells) Rauðskinna, which was supposedly buried in 1520 with its author, Bishop Gottskálk grimmi Nikulásson. Loftur left the Hólar school in 1722 — sources vary as to whether he graduated or was expelled — but what happened in his life after that is uncertain.

According to one legend, Loftur was driven insane by his failure to acquire the Rauðskinna and was placed under the care of a priest in Staðarstaður. He later took to sea in an old rowboat and disappeared, presumably drowned.

== Galdra-Loftur ==
Loftur is the subject of the play Galdra-Loftur (Danish: Ønsket; English: The Wish or Loftur the Magician) by Jóhann Sigurjónsson. The play portrays Loftur as a Faust-like ambitious scholar seeking power and knowledge through sorcery. The play was first performed on December 26, 1914, in Reyjavík and published in Danish and Icelandic in 1915.

== Other sources ==
- Páll Eggert Ólason (1948) Íslenskar æviskrár (Hið íslenska bókmenntafélag)
