= Loftur =

Loftur is an Icelandic masculine given name. Notable people with the name include:

- Loftur Þorsteinsson (born 1702, fl. 1722), Icelandic person known for his supposed mastery of Old Norse sorcery
- Loftur Sæmundsson (died 1163), Icelandic chieftain
- Jón Loftur Árnason (born 1960), Icelandic chess grandmaster
