= Vilborg Auður Ísleifsdóttir-Bickel =

Icelandic historian (born 1945)

- Born: 1945 (age 80–81); Reykjavík, Iceland
- Scientific career
- Fields: History, Reformation
- Thesis: Die Einführung der Reformation in Island 1537–1565: Die Revolution von oben (1995)

Vilborg Auður Ísleifsdóttir-Bickel (born 1945) is an Icelandic historian whose research focus centers on the Reformation in Iceland.

== Academic career ==
Vilborg Auður Ísleifsdóttir-Bickel studied history at the University of Iceland and the Johannes Gutenberg University Mainz. In 1995, she obtained her PhD in Mainz with a doctoral thesis on the socio-economic and cultural impacts of the Icelandic Reformation. Her research specifically highlights the structural challenges of the Church Ordinance from 1537 and the poor relief following the dissolution of monasteries during the period from 1537 to 1565. Her scholarly work is recognized internationally and widely cited in historical research on early modern Scandinavia.

== Humanitarian work ==
In addition to her academic pursuits, she has been deeply involved in humanitarian efforts since the 1990s. In response to the Bosnian War, she co-founded the humanitarian organization BISER ("Tear") in Wiesbaden alongside physician Helga Brenneis. The organization established three women's support centers in Sarajevo, Travnik, and Tuzla, providing medical, psychological, and vocational training for war-traumatized women.

== Awards ==
- 2011: Elisabeth Norgall Award for her outstanding commitment to the victims of the Bosnian War.
- 2021: Order of Merit of the Federal Republic of Germany (Verdienstkreuz am Bande) for her decades-long dedication to supporting traumatized women and refugees.

== Selected publications ==
- Die Einführung der Reformation in Island 1537–1565: Die Revolution von oben. Peter Lang, Frankfurt am Main 1996, ISBN 978-3-631-50001-9 (Doctoral thesis, University of Mainz 1995).
- Siðbreytingin á Íslandi 1537–1565: Byltinging að ofan. Hið íslenska bókmenntafélag, Reykjavík 1997, ISBN 978-9979-804-98-7 (in Icelandic).
- Habenichtse und Landstreicher. Zur mittelalterlichen und frühneuzeitlichen Armenfürsorge in Island und deren Zusammenbruch [Have-nots and Vagabonds: On Medieval and Early Modern Poor Relief in Iceland and Its Collapse]. In: Medium Aevum Quotidianum. Vol. 52, Krems 2005, pp. 62–88 (Open access PDF) (in German).
- Byltinging að ofan. Stjórnskipunarsaga 16. aldar. Hið íslenska bókmenntafélag, Reykjavík 2013, ISBN 978-9979-66-287-7 (in Icelandic).
- Die Einführung der Reformation in Island 1537–1565: Die Geburt eines frühmodernen Staates. wbg Academic, Darmstadt 2021, ISBN 978-3-534-40429-2 (in German).
- The Revolution from the Top in Iceland 1537–1565: The Birth of an Early Modern State. 2025, ISBN 978-3-000-82823-2.
