= Anne of Saint Bartholomew =

Spanish Discalced Carmelite (1550-1626)

Blessed Anne of Saint Bartholomew OCD
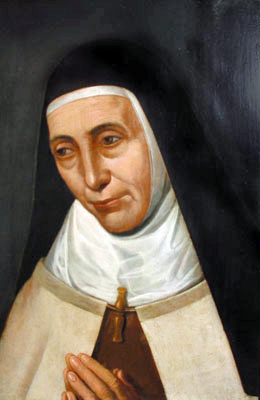
- Portrait c. 1600

Virgin
- Born: 1 October 1550; Almendral de la Cañada, Old Castile, Crown of Castile
- Died: 7 June 1626 (aged 75); Antwerp
- Venerated in: Roman Catholic Church
- Beatified: 6 May 1917, Saint Peter's Basilica by Pope Benedict XV
- Feast: 7 June
- Patronage: Antwerp

Anne of Saint Bartholomew (Spanish: Ana de San Bartolomé; born Ana García Manzanas; 1 October 1550 – 7 June 1626) was a Spanish Discalced Carmelite and companion to Teresa of Ávila who established new monasteries in France and the Low Countries. Anne sometimes struggled with her superiors as she set about setting new convents and holding her position as a prioress. She later settled in the Spanish Netherlands and opened a house, remaining there until her death in 1626. Pope Benedict XV beatified her in 1917.

== Life ==
Ana García Manzanas was born in Almendral de la Cañada on 1 October 1550 as the seventh child to Ferdinand García and Maria Mancanas. That date of her birth she was also baptized in the parish church of His Holiness the Savior. Together with her three brothers and three sisters she was raised to be close to God which she learnt from her pious parents. The entire household - on a frequent basis - attended Mass and recited rosaries together. Her father had a priest teach the children the doctrine of the faith while her mother opened their home to the poor and adopted orphans to raise as her own.

In her childhood she loved the paintings that depicted the Passion of the Lord, and she wanted to be associated with his suffering, so she gave her food to beggars and often walked barefoot along stone paths. In 1559 her mother died, and in 1560 her father died in that she described as being flung into her "deepest affliction". When she was of the proper age her older siblings wanted her to enter into marriage, though in her heart she desired to become a nun. Her older brothers tried to test her will through giving her the difficult task of sharing the work of the laborers at the fields in the hopes that she would renounce her calling. Once her brothers did this she started avoiding speaking to men and giving them the chance to speak to her so as to defend herself from marriage since she wanted to be married to God. The brothers felt that she was too tenderhearted to live in the austere mode of life in a monastic life, and they thought that she would join but would soon leave and thus burden the household with dishonor. Anne experienced visions and apparitions that made her unwilling to give up her dream, though on one occasion had a frightful apparition of a giant demon that scared her to the point of illness. Her relatives became quite concerned for her wellbeing and so took her to a hermitage dedicated to Saint Bartholomew to make a novena. Once Manzanas arrived outside the hermitage she was at once seized with paralysis and when her relatives carried her in - and not long after entering - she found herself cured of this sudden affliction.

Anne later entered the convent on 2 November 1570 as a secular member of the Discalced Carmelites, the first secular that the foundress Teresa of Ávila accepted; she later made her religious vows on 15 August 1572. For the next decade she filled the post of an infirmarian. Once Teresa broke her left arm at Christmas in 1577 she became her almost inseparable companion and caregiver as well as an aid; it was she in whose arms Teresa died at Alba de Tormes on 4 October 1582. The nun made a short visit to Madrid after her friend's death.

Following the death of the foundress, she returned to Ávila and took part in the foundation of a convent at Ocana (1595) while she was one of the seven nuns selected for the introduction of the order into the Kingdom of France on 15 October 1604. The French superiors - desirous of sending her as a prioress to Pontoise - obliged her to pass from the state of a secular sister to that of a choir nun. So unusual a step met with the disapproval of her companions but, as the foundress had once foretold, she offered no resistance. Anne had also been forewarned that the same step would cause her great sufferings.

Her priorship at Pontoise was from January to September 1605, and she later acted in that role in Paris from October 1605 to April 1608. Her priorship also took her to Tours from May 1608 to 1611, all of which brought her great trials, not the least of which were differences with her superiors. The expiration of her last term of office saw her return to Paris, though she was warned in a vision and so proceeded to the Flanders in October 1611. There she founded and became prioress of a convent in Antwerp on 27 October 1612 which she governed to the end of her life. Twice she was instrumental in delivering the town from the hands of Protestant forces.

Anne died on 7 June 1626.

=== Works ===
Her writings, which include historical, autobiographical, and doctrinal works, poetry, and numerous letters, have been published as part of the series Monumenta historica carmeli teresiani Her autobiography has been translated into French and English, among other languages.

== Beatification ==
The beatification process culminated on 29 June 1735 after Pope Clement XII confirmed that Anne lived a life of heroic virtue and named her as Venerable. Two miracles attributed to her were investigated, and their approval would lead to her beatification:

- The first miracle concerned the miraculous cure of Father Leopold of Saint John the Baptist from chronic cerebral abscess coupled with meningitis.
- The second miracle concerned the 1633 cure of the Queen of France Maria de' Medici from a prolonged and severe bout of typhoid fever.

The general committee for the Congregation for Rites - with the pope present to observe - took a vote on both miracles and approved them both in their session on 30 January 1917 while Pope Benedict XV later approved them both on 25 February 1917. Benedict XV beatified Anne in Saint Peter's Basilica on 6 May 1917.

The cause for her sainthood was formally opened on 24 February 1937, and processes to evaluate miracles began on 27 February 1937 and 18 November 1938. The Discalced Carmelite General Postulator is the current postulator for this cause.
