= Rauðskinna =

Icelandic grimoire

Rauðskinna (English: Red Skin), is a Grimoire known as The Book of Power, or the bible of all wizards. The legendary book about black magic is alleged to have been buried with Gottskálk the cruel, Gottskálk grimmi Nikulásson of Hólar, after he stole it from Chief and wizard Jon from Svalbard. It’s said his grandfather, Thorkell, had written it. The subject of the book was to learn to master magic to such a degree as to control Satan. The book has been the subject of legend and folklore and desired by practitioners of galdr. One such legend is the galdr master Loftur Þorsteinsson (Galdra-Loftur) tried to acquire it and allegedly lost his life because of it.

== Other sources ==
- Páll Eggert Ólason (1948) Íslenskar æviskrár (Hið íslenska bókmenntafélag)
