= Gottskálk grimmi Nikulásson =

Bishop of Holar, Iceland (1497-1520)

His Excellency Gottskálk Nikulásson
- Bishop of Holar
- Church: Roman Catholic
- Diocese: Hólar
- Installed: May 1497
- Term ended: 8 December 1520
- Predecessor: Ólafur Rögnvaldsson
- Opposed to: Jón Arason

Personal details
- Born: 1469
- Died: 8 December 1520 (aged 50–51)

Gottskálk grimmi Nikulasson (1469 – 8 December 1520) was the Bishop of Hólar in Iceland from May 1497 to 1520. He was the nephew of Ólafur Rögnvaldsson who preceded him as bishop. He was succeeded by Jón Arason (1484–1550), the last Roman Catholic bishop in Iceland prior to the restoration in 1923.

Gottskálk Nikulasson has received harsh judgement in Icelandic history, resulting in his nickname grimmi, meaning cruel. He is also known as the author of a book about black magic, Rauðskinna.

== Other sources ==
- Páll Eggert Ólason (1948) Íslenskar æviskrár (Hið íslenska bókmenntafélag)
