= Stóridómur =

Set of Icelandic laws passed in 1564

Stóridómur (Icelandic pronunciation: [ˈstouːrɪˌtouːmʏr̥], English: The Grand Judgment) was a set of laws passed by the Icelandic parliament, Alþingi, in the summer of 1564, following the adoption of Lutheranism in Iceland.

The instigators of the laws were the two lawspeakers of the Alþingi and the Danish King's representative in Iceland, Páll Stígsson. The King confirmed the laws in the following year. Iceland had recently adopted Lutheranism, and the laws were enacted to reduce moral licentiousness and sexual lasciviousness in the country.

The laws introduced harsher punishments for various moral crimes, such as incest and having children out of wedlock, and placed the executive power of meting out punishment and collecting fines in the hands of the emissaries of the Danish King.

== See also ==
- Reformation in Iceland
