= Daði Guðmundsson =

- Born: c. 1495
- Died: 1563 (aged 67–68); Snóksdal, Iceland
- Other name: Daði of Snóksdal
- Occupation: landholder
- Known for: Battle of Sauðafell

Daði Guðmundsson (c. 1495 – 1563) or Daði of Snóksdal was a farmer and magistrate in 16th century Iceland. He lived in the town of Snóksdalur in Dalasýsla county and played an important role in the Battle of Sauðafell and the Lutheran Reformation in Iceland.

== Personal life ==
Daði was a son of the farmer Guðmund Finnsson and Þórunn Daðadóttir, who was related by marriage to Torfi Arason, the king's representative (hirðstjóri) for the north and west of Iceland. Daði was a prosperous landholder with successful fishing operations based on the Hvammsfjörður. Knut Gjerset, in his History of Iceland, describes Daði as a "rich and influential man of shady morals".

In 1525, Daði married Guðrún, daughter of Einar Ölduhryggjarskáld, a poet and priest who was one of the main leaders for the Icelandic Reformation. Guðrún's brothers Marteinn Einarsson, the second Lutheran bishop of Iceland, and the sheriffs Pétur and Brandur Einarsson, known as Gleraugna-Pétur and Moldar-Brandur respectively, also played prominent roles in spread of Lutheranism in Iceland.

== The Battle of Sauðafell ==
Catholic Bishop Jón Arason, who strenuously opposed efforts to promote Lutheranism in Iceland, considered Daði and Gleraugna-Pétur as his main opponents. In January 1549, Jón excommunicated Daði and then went with a contingent of soldiers to capture him, sacking three of Daði's estates in the process. Daði, who had 50 to 80 men under arms with him at Snóksdal in the spring of 1549, resisted the attempt and remained free. In autumn 1550, Jón and his sons, Ara and Birni, took an army of 100 men and captured Daði's estate at Sauðafell. Daði raised a large body of men and at the Battle of Sauðafell surprised Jón and his men, capturing them.

== Later life ==
Daði continued his life as a wealthy man, holding numerous properties and a large number of cattle, as well as six ships. He also served as steward of the land of the Helgafellsklaustur monastery.

Daði and Guðrún's only child was their daughter, Þórunn, who drowned with her husband Birni Hannesson in 1554, leaving three young children to inherit Daði's assets when he died in 1563. Daði also had several children by Ingveldur Árnadóttir, but it was Guðrún and Þórunn who inherited most of his wealth.
