= Vörðufell =

Mountain in Grímsnes- og Grafningshreppur, Southern Region, Iceland

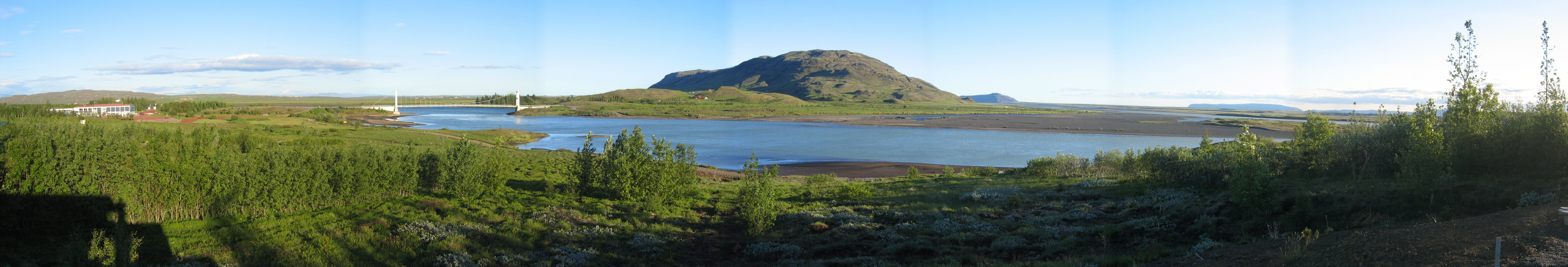

Highest point
- Coordinates: 64°04′00.1″N 20°33′00.0″W

Geography
- Country: Iceland

Vörðufell (Icelandic pronunciation: [ˈvœrðʏˌfɛtl̥]) is a 391 metres (1,283 ft) mountain near the Hvítá river and the town of Iða in Árnessýsla, Iceland. Geologically, the mountain consists primarily of tuff and diabase. From the air, Vörðufell appears triangular with the small lake, Úlfsvatn, near the summit.

According to local legends, in the 18th century a young man built a set of feathered wings and glided from the mountain top to Skálholt. Another legend tells of a lake monster that lives in Úlfsvatn.
