= Almendral de la Cañada =

Coordinates: 40°11′N 4°44′W

Almendral de la Cañada, Spain
- Flag Coat of arms

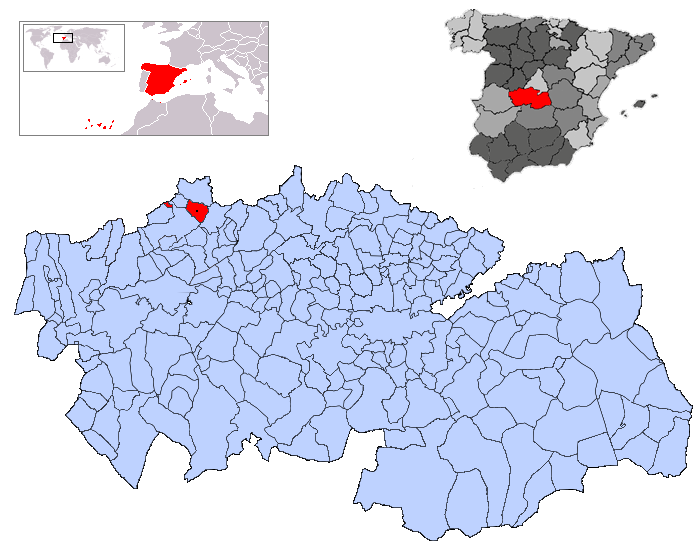
- Country: Spain
- Autonomous community: Castile-La Mancha
- Province: Toledo
- Municipality: Almendral de la Cañada

Government
  - Mayor: Juan José Menéndez Rico (PSOE)

Area
  - Total: 34 km^{2} (13 sq mi)
- Elevation: 620 m (2,030 ft)

Population (2025-01-01)
  - Total: 341
  - Density: 10/km^{2} (26/sq mi)
- Time zone: UTC+1 (CET)
  - Summer (DST): UTC+2 (CEST)
- Postal Code: 45631
- Area code: 925
- Vehicle registration: TO

Almendral de la Cañada is a municipality located in the province of Toledo, Castile-La Mancha, Spain. According to the 2018 census (INE), the municipality has a population of 305 inhabitants.

== Demographics ==
Historical population
Year	Pop.	±%
1900	702	—
1910	739	+5.3%
1920	738	−0.1%
1930	858	+16.3%
1940	940	+9.6%
1950	889	−5.4%
1960	924	+3.9%
1970	709	−23.3%
1981	451	−36.4%
1991	401	−11.1%
2001	399	−0.5%
2011	373	−6.5%
2021	327	−12.3%
2023	333	+1.8%
Source: ISTAT
