= Icelandic Reformation =

Late 15th Century conflict between Denmark and Sweden

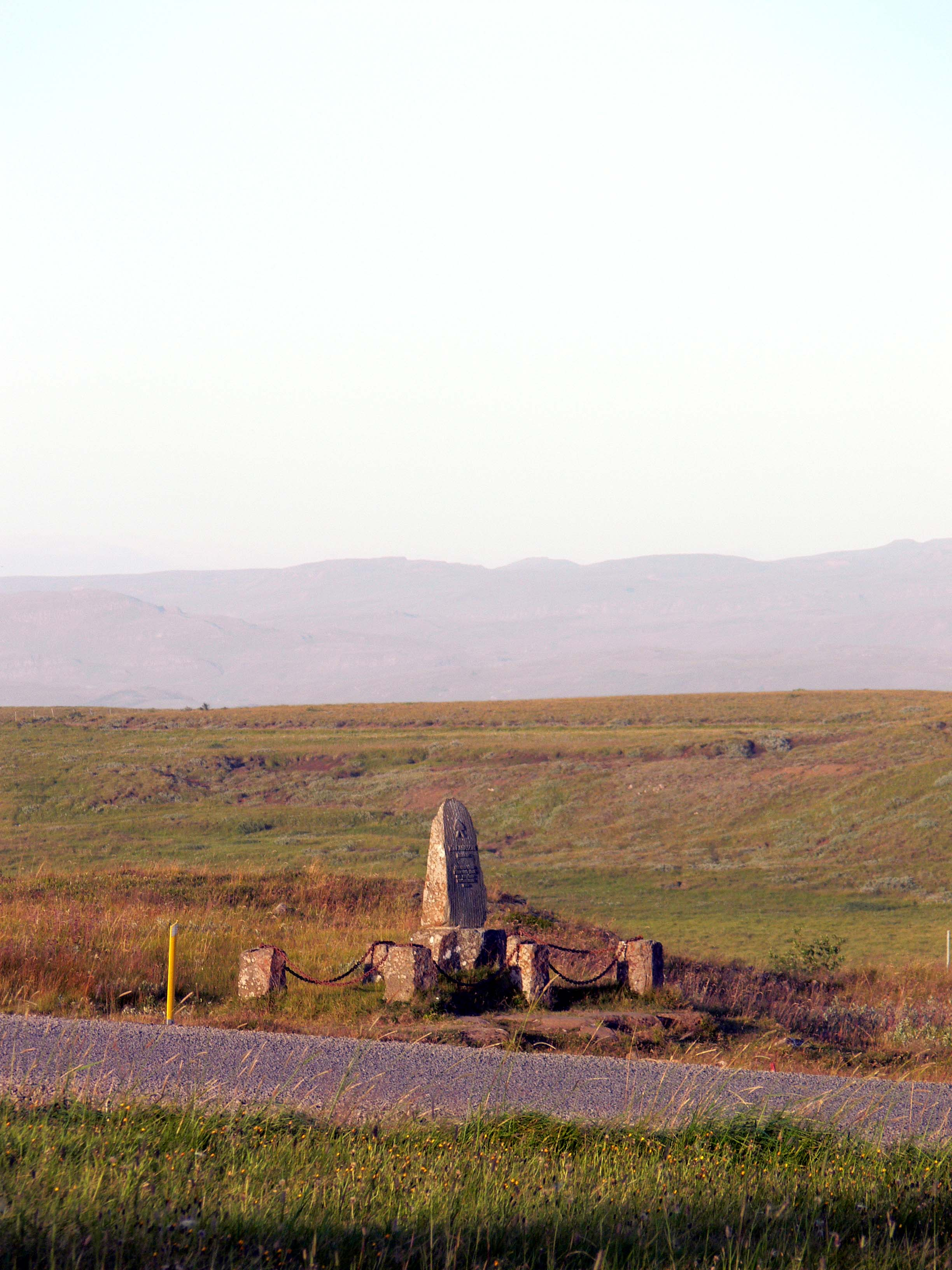
Memorial at the place of execution of Catholic bishop Jón Arason, in Skálholt in southern Iceland

The Icelandic Reformation (Icelandic: Siðaskiptin á Íslandi) took place in the middle of the 16th century. Iceland was at this time a territory ruled by Denmark-Norway, and Lutheran religious reform was imposed on the Icelanders by King Christian III of Denmark. Resistance to the Icelandic Reformation ended with the execution of Jón Arason, Catholic bishop of Hólar, and his two sons, in 1550.

== Background ==
=== Reformation in Denmark-Norway ===
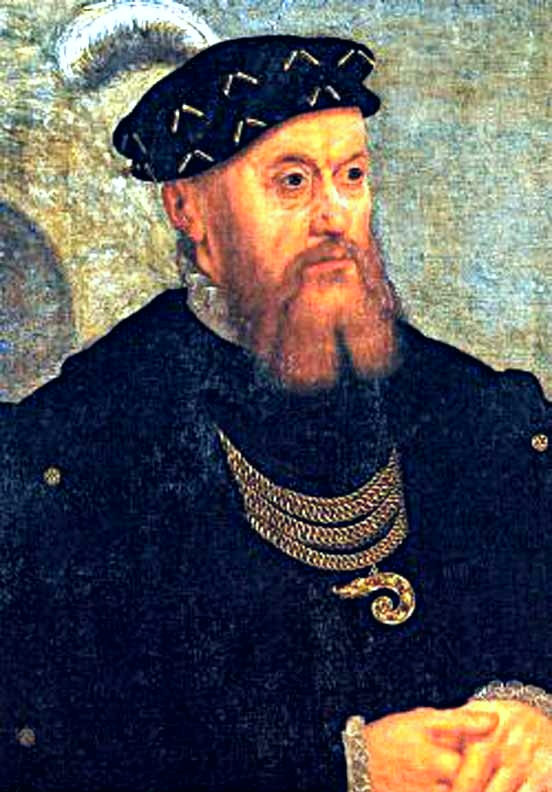
King Christian III of Denmark was a Lutheran.

Christian III became king of Denmark in 1536. That same year, on 30 October 1536, he formally established the Danish Lutheran Church and decreed that his Danish subjects should adopt Lutheranism. He quickly extended religious reform to Norway (1537) and the Faroe Islands (1540), but left Iceland a Catholic country for some time, making no efforts to introduce Protestant reforms in the ensuing years.

=== The Icelandic Catholic Church ===
The Catholic bishops in Iceland at the time were Ögmundur Pálsson of Skálholt and Jón Arason of Hólar. They were both powerful leaders who had originally been bitter enemies, but with the approaching threat of Lutheranism, they found common cause as allies against religious reform. Denmark had been embroiled in civil war during the dissolution of the Kalmar Union, and the two Icelandic bishops had held both secular and ecclesiastical power in the country for many years.

=== Lutheran influence in Iceland ===
Luther's influence had already reached Iceland before King Christian's decree. The Germans fished near Iceland's coast, and the Hanseatic League engaged in commerce with the Icelanders. These Germans raised a Lutheran church in Hafnarfjörður as early as 1533. Through German trade connections, many young Icelanders studied in Hamburg.

Ögmundur Pálsson, bishop of Skálholt, was at this point old and infirm. He had in his service several young men who had been educated in Germany and introduced to Protestantism. Many of them were in favour of religious reform, although they kept such views from the bishop.

== Events ==
=== Danish efforts at Reform ===
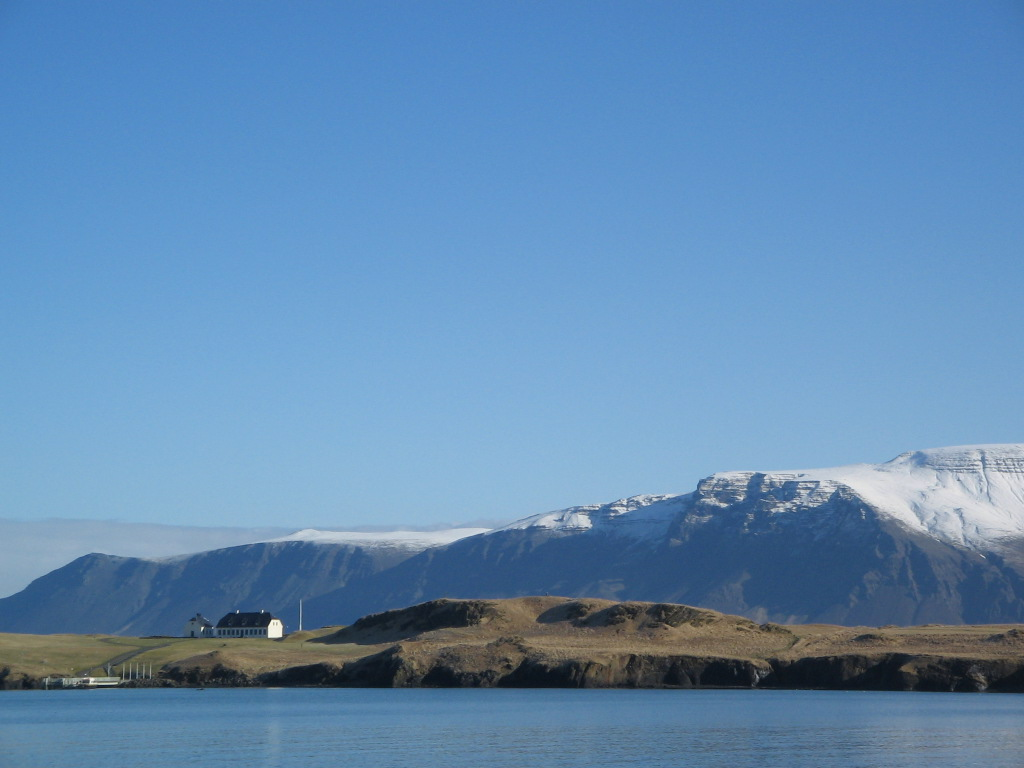
Modern-day Viðey, formerly the seat of a Catholic monastery.

In 1538, when the kingly decree of the new Church ordinance reached Iceland, bishop Ögmundur and his clergy denounced it, threatening excommunication for anyone subscribing to the German heresy. In 1539, the King sent a new governor to Iceland, Klaus von Mervitz, with a mandate to introduce reform and take possession of church property.

Von Mervitz seized a monastery in Viðey with the help of his sheriff, Dietrich of Minden, and his soldiers. They drove the monks out and seized all their possessions, for which they were promptly excommunicated by Ögmundur. Later, that same summer, the sheriff and his men stopped in Skálholt and abused the bishop. His supporters then gathered forces and attacked Dietrich, killing him and all his men.

=== The New Testament translated into Icelandic ===
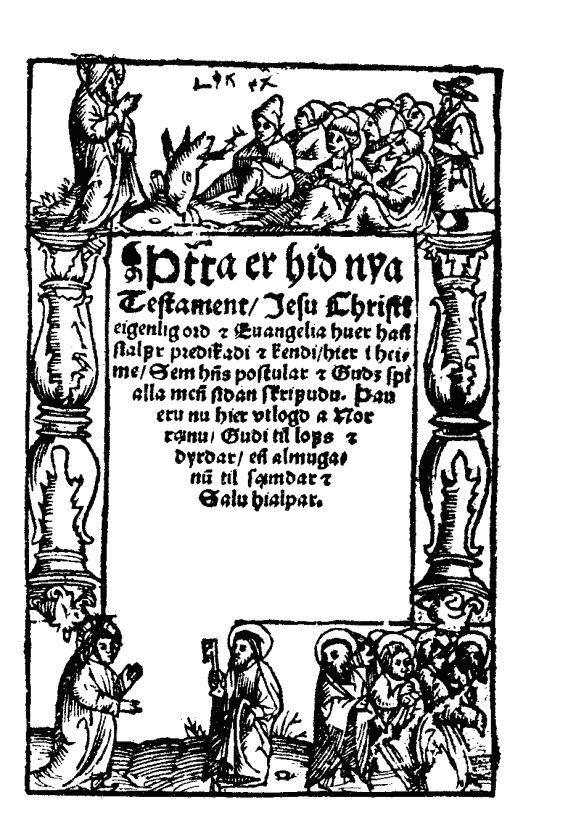
Title page of Oddur Gottskálksson's 1540 translation of the New Testament into Icelandic.

One of the young men in the service of bishop Ögmundur was Oddur Gottskálksson, son of Gottskálk Nikulásson, a former bishop of Hólar. Oddur returned to Iceland from his studies in Germany in 1535, aged 20, and quickly began translating the New Testament into Icelandic. He is said to have done the bulk of the translation in the barn of the farm adjoining the Skálholt see. Oddur's New Testament was printed in Roskilde in 1540, and is the oldest preserved printed work in the Icelandic language.

Another of these German-educated young men was Gissur Einarsson, who was secretly in favour of religious reformation. In 1539, bishop Ögmundur, who was almost blind now, made him his successor, and Gissur was consecrated bishop while Ögmundur still lived. The old bishop came to regret his decision when his protégé's Lutheran views surfaced. However, he was at this point very old and infirm, and could do little to stem Gissur's influence, although he nominally shared the see with him.

=== Bishop Ögmundur seized ===
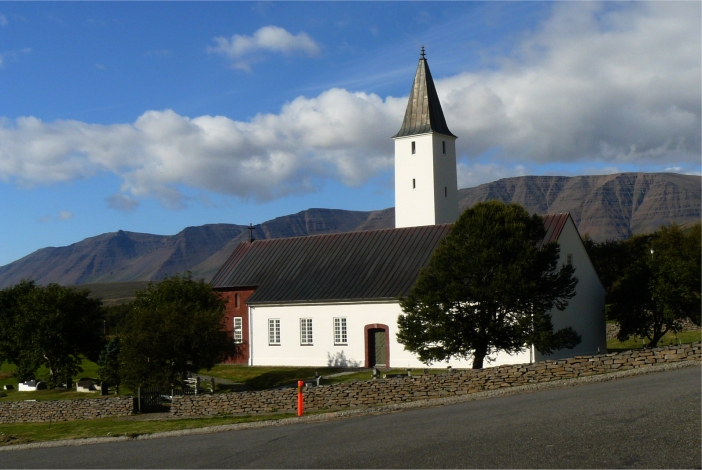
Modern-day church at Hólar.

In the spring of 1541, Danish soldiers under the command of Christoffer Huitfeldt landed in Iceland, arrested Ögmundur and took him to Denmark. He died in Danish custody in 1542. Gissur was now free to introduce Lutheran religious reforms unopposed, but did not make the progress he had hoped for. Not all Icelanders were happy with the reforms, and the see of Hólar remained firmly Catholic.

The Danish king and his emissaries did not immediately move against Catholic bishop Jón Arason, who still controlled his seat at Hólar. In the ensuing years, Iceland remained divided into Protestants and Catholics, but Gissur and Jón Arason kept the peace.

=== Jón Arason fights back ===
When Protestant bishop Gissur Einarsson died, Jón Arason made his move. He was the last remaining Catholic bishop in the Nordic countries, and he intended to reintroduce Catholicism. Jón rode to Skálholt to occupy it and oversee the election of a new bishop. However, the people at Skálholt were prepared for the attack, and after a five-day siege, Jón was forced to give up and ride away.

Jón brought about the election of abbot Sigvarður Halldórsson in Þykkvabær as bishop of Skálholt, and sent him to Denmark to be consecrated. This was refused. Sigvarður died abroad in 1550, after adopting Lutheranism. Instead Marteinn Einarsson, the preferred candidate of the Lutherans, was consecrated as Gissur's successor in Copenhagen.

Marteinn returned to Iceland in 1549. Jón then sent his sons, Ari and Björn, to arrest him. They brought him to Hólar, where he remained in custody throughout the following year. In the spring of 1550, Jón travelled to Skálholt, where he exhumed and desecrated the corpse of bishop Gissur, denouncing him as a heretic.

=== Jón Arason and his sons beheaded ===
In the summer of 1550, Jón rode to the Althing, where he marshalled enough support to pass a decree that Icelanders should readopt the Catholic faith. He and his sons arrested many leading Lutherans, forcing them to readopt the Catholic faith or else flee the country. Jón now controlled almost all of Iceland's religious establishments, except for the churches in the hands of Pétur Einarsson, brother of bishop Marteinn, and Daði Guðmundsson of Snóksdalur, the bishop's brother-in-law, who was loyal to the king, and had been entrusted with capturing Jón Arason.

That autumn, Jón and his sons rode west to Dalir with the aim of getting Daði under their power, either through coercion or compromise. They stopped in Sauðafell for a few days, during which Daði gathered many men and overpowered them in a brief struggle known as the Battle of Sauðafell. They were taken to Skálholt, but fears that they might be rescued by Catholic Icelanders resulted in a speedy beheading for all three on 7 November 1550.

== Legacy of the Icelandic Reformation ==
=== Catholicism outlawed and Danish rule strengthened ===
With Lutheranism securely in place, Catholicism was outlawed, and all Catholic church property was seized by Iceland's secular rulers. The lands belonging to the Icelandic churches fell into the hands of the King of Denmark, and the commercial influence of Danes and the Danish crown in Iceland greatly increased, culminating in the Danish-Icelandic Trade Monopoly enacted in 1602 and abolished in 1854. Criminal punishment became harsher and enforcement of laws stricter, when a set of laws known as Stóridómur passed in 1564.

In Iceland, the medieval system of poor relief had evolved into an effective framework that distributed the tithe for the poor. This was complemented by the bishoprics, monasteries, and larger benefices, which developed considerable institutional synergy. However, the royal confiscation of the monasteries and portions of the property of the bishopric in Skálholt depleted the financial resources available for welfare assistance, leading to the destruction of the social infrastructure. Consequently, a small upper class emerged that managed the royal estates and held the highest public offices, while the common population fell into widespread poverty.

During the Middle Ages, the Catholic Church in Iceland performed many of the functions of a state authority. The Church Ordinance, a constitutional document from 1537 designed for an urban society, fundamentally transformed the Church in Iceland and the structure of the social welfare system. It took some time for the devoutly Catholic population to accept Lutheran doctrine, as cities in Iceland did not begin to develop until the 20th century. The poet Einar Sigurðsson (1538–1626) captured this change in a poem: “Lord Christian / sent two warships / to Eyjafjörður / laden with pure faith.”

Although Latin remained the official language of the Lutheran Church of Iceland until 1686, and a good part of the former Catholic terminology and other ceremonial externals were retained, the Lutheran church differed considerably in doctrine. Those Catholics who refused to convert eventually fled, many of them to Scotland. No Catholic priest was permitted to set foot on Icelandic soil for more than three centuries.

=== Catholicism in Iceland today ===
The Catholic Church resumed missionary activities in Iceland from the 1850s and onwards, and as of 1 January 2015, there were 11,911 members of the Roman Catholic Church in Iceland, an estimated 80 percent of them foreigners. Landakotskirkja is the cathedral of the Catholic Church in Iceland.
