= Staðarstaður =

Town and rectory in Snæfellsnes, Iceland

Coordinates: 64°49′05″N 23°00′24″W

Staðarstaður (Icelandic pronunciation: [ˈstaːðarˌstaːðʏr̥]) is a small settlement and parsonage located in Snæfellsnesi, Iceland. It is claimed that Ari Þorgilsson lived there in the 12th century. In 1981 a memorial by Ragnar Kjartansson as a remembrance of this was erected. Its name roughly translates to "Place Place".
