= Battle of Sauðafell =

Battle of the Icelandic Reformation

Coordinates: 65°1′2″N 21°38′54″W

- Part of the European wars of religion and the Protestant Reformation
Date	2 October 1550
Location	Sauðafell, Iceland
Result	Daði Guðmundsson victory: Jón Arason defeated and captured; Collapse of Catholicism in Iceland

Belligerents
Jón Arason's forces	Daði Guðmundsson's forces

Commanders and leaders
Jón Arason (POW)	Daði Guðmundsson

Strength
~100	~80

Casualties and losses
Unknown	Unknown

The Battle of Sauðafell (Orrustan á Sauðafelli) occurred in 1550, when the forces of Catholic Bishop Jón Arason clashed with the forces of Daði Guðmundsson of Snóksdalur.

== Location ==
Sauðafell was an important part of Daði's fief in western Iceland, close to his estate in Snóksdalur and vital to the Bishop's campaign against Lutheran influence in the country as it blocked his lines of communication in the West to the South of Iceland.

== Battle ==
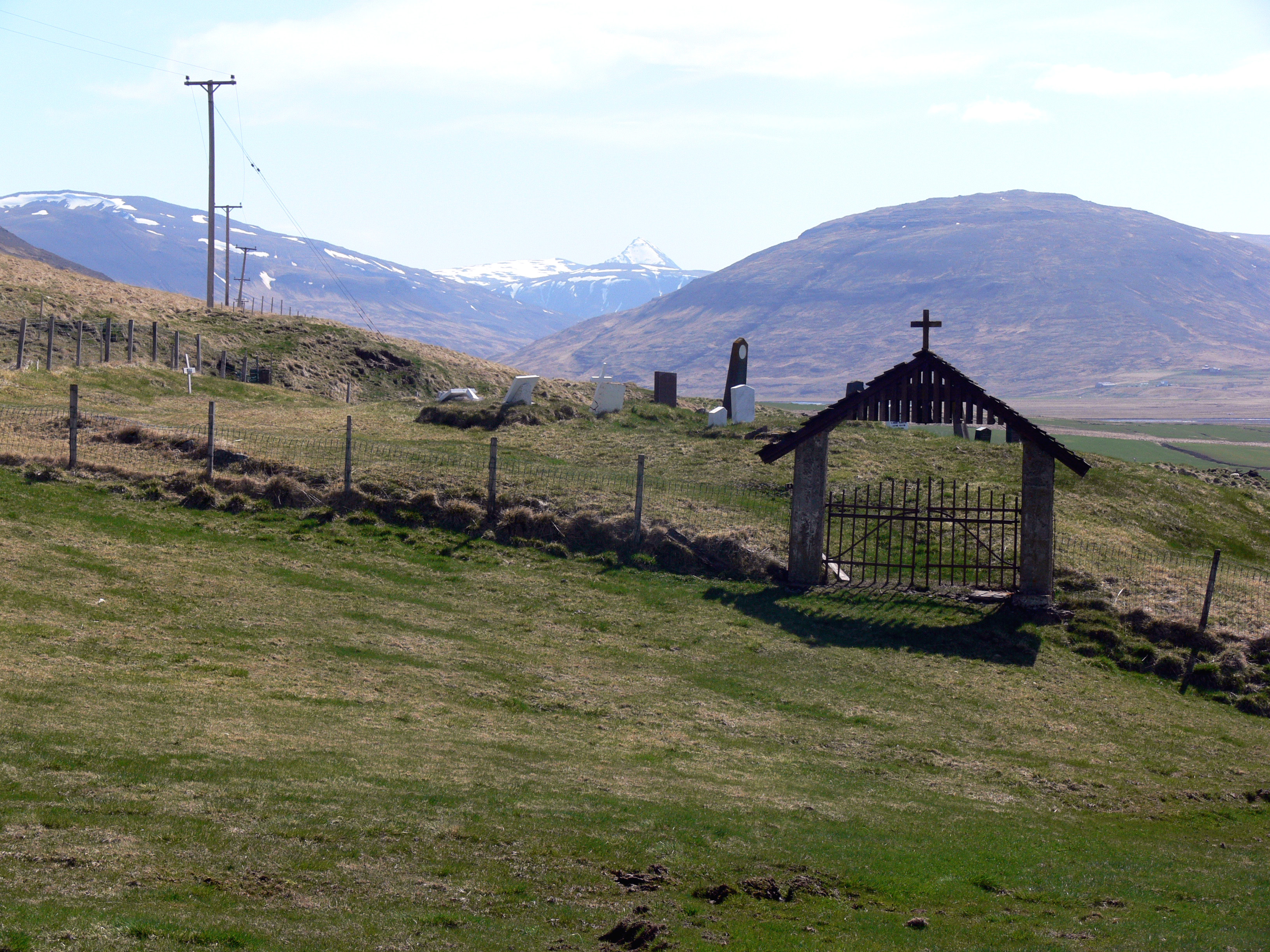
The cemetery at Sauðafell farm, near where the church where Jón Arason surrendered once stood.

Jón Arason brought with him a minimal force of around 100 men and took Sauðafell without opposition initially. Daði responded by secretly raising an elite force of similar size from his followers, half of which were heavily armored sveinar and half unarmored but equipped with guns. Mounted and covered in gray cloaks they marched under the cover of dark and foggy weather unnoticed by the Bishop's forces, surprising them early in the morning. The battle was nonetheless close fought and Daði was almost shot down by gunfire when he led his troops into the fray.

After being cornered in the Church, the Bishop accepted Daði's terms and surrendered. The bishop was captured along with his two sons and they were executed on 7 November 1550.

== Sources ==
Vilborg Auður Ísleifsdóttir, Siðbreytingin á Íslandi 1537–1565: Byltingin að ofan,, Hið íslenzka bókmenntafélag. Reykjavík. 1997.

- Bogi Benediktsson, Sýslumannaæfir. vol. III. Reykjavik. 1932.
- Íslenzkt fornbréfasafn, sem hefir inni að halda bréf og gjörninga, dóma og máldaga og aðrar skrár, er snerta Ísland eða íslenzka menn. vol XI. Copenhagen.
- Íslenzkt fornbréfasafn, sem hefir inni að halda bréf og gjörninga, dóma og máldaga og aðrar skrár, er snerta Ísland eða íslenzka menn. vol XII. Copenhagen.
