= Jón Arason =

Icelandic Roman Catholic bishop and poet (1484–1550)

The Right Reverend Jón Arason
- Bishop of Hólar
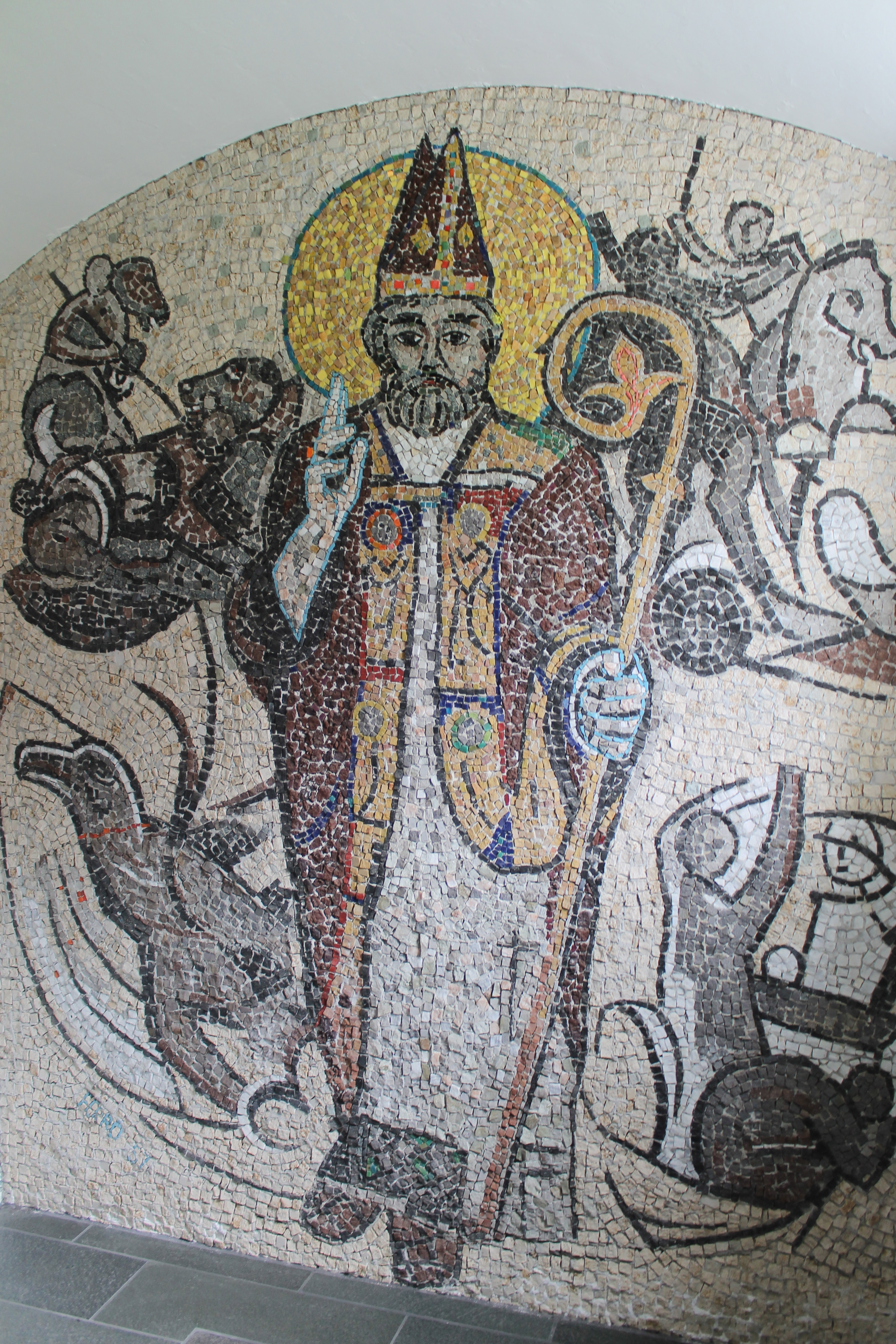
- Bishop Arason
- Church: Roman Catholic
- Diocese: Hólar
- Appointed: 22 December 1520
- In office: 1524–1550
- Predecessor: Gottskálk grimmi Nikulásson
- Successor: Ólafur Hjaltason

Orders
- Ordination: 1504
- Consecration: 1524 by Olav Engelbrektsson

Personal details
- Born: 1484 Gryta, Iceland
- Died: 7 November 1550 (aged 65–66) Skalholt, Iceland

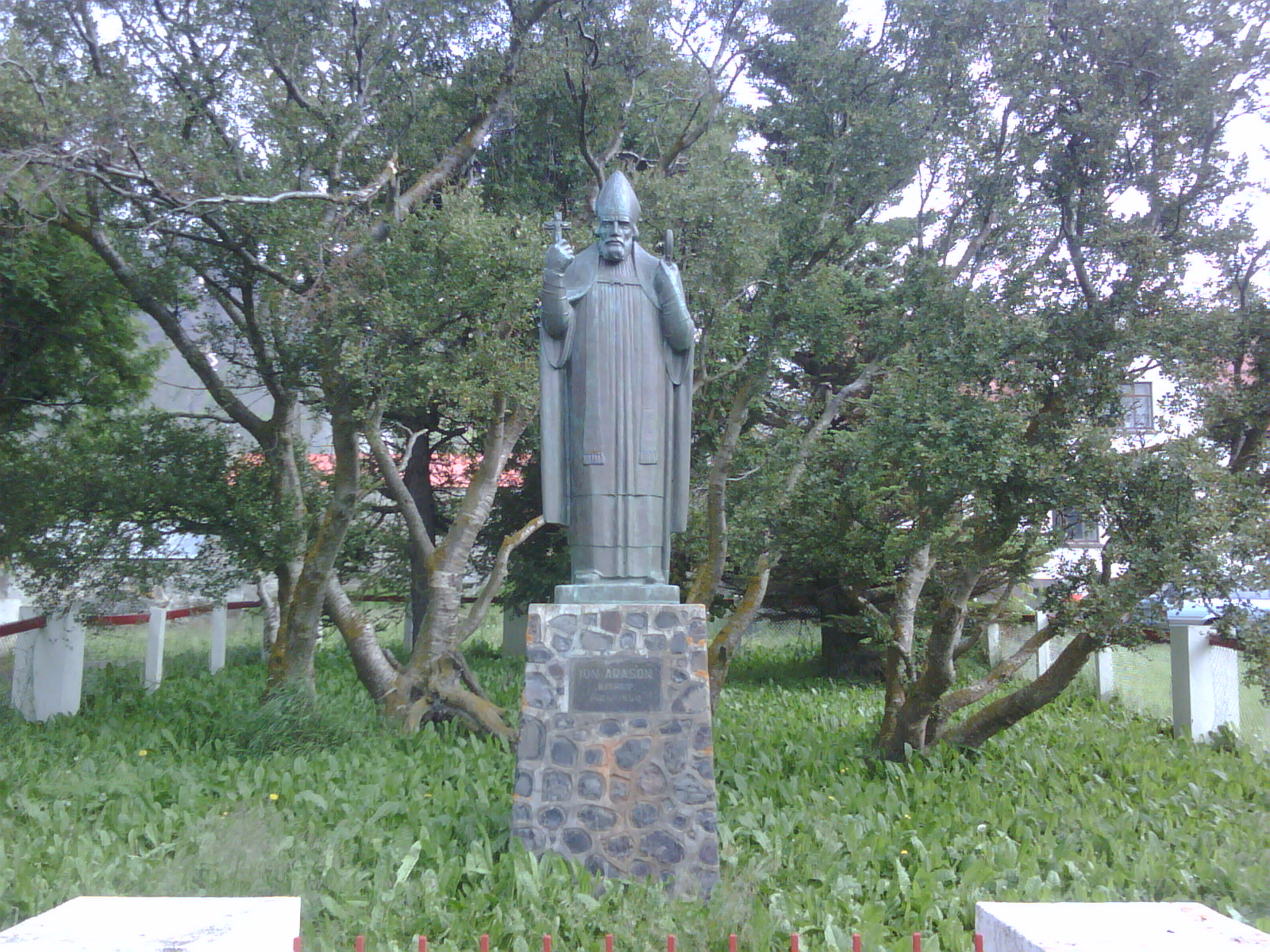
Statue of Jón Arason, by Guðmundur Einarsson, in Munkaþverá

Jón Arason (1484 – November 7, 1550) was an Icelandic Roman Catholic bishop and poet, who was executed in his struggle against the Reformation in Iceland.

== Background ==
Jón Arason was born in Gryta, educated at Munkaþverá, the Benedictine abbey of Iceland, and was ordained a Catholic priest about 1504. Having attracted the notice of Gottskálk Nikulásson bishop of Hólar, he was sent on two missions to Norway. When Gottskálk died in 1520, Jón Arason was chosen as his successor in the episcopal see of Hólar, but he was not officially consecrated until 1524. The other Icelandic bishop, Ögmundur Pálsson of Skálholt, had strongly opposed Jón and even attempted to arrest him in 1522, but Jón managed to escape Iceland on a German ship. The two bishops were eventually reconciled in 1525. Bishop Ögmundur later opposed the imposition of Lutheranism to Iceland, but being old and blind by that time his opposition was ineffective.

Clerical celibacy was practiced in medieval Iceland only in the sense that priests did not marry their partners, and Jón Arason had at least nine children by his long-time partner Helga Sigurðardóttir, of whom six lived to adulthood: sons Ari, Björn, Magnús and Sigurður and daughters Þórunn and Helga. Helga Sigurðardóttir brought important allies for Jón through her family connections, as her father Sigurðar Sveinbjarnarson was a powerful priest at Múli in Aðaldalur. In 1522, Jón officially adopted four of his children as his heirs: Ari, Björn, Magnús and Þórunn.

== Struggle with the king ==
Bishop Jón became involved in a dispute with his sovereign, King Christian III, because of the bishop's refusal to promote Lutheranism on the island. Although initially he took a defensive rather than an offensive position on the matter, this changed radically in 1548. At that point he and Bishop Ögmundur joined their forces to attack the Lutherans. Bishop Ögmundur's contribution did not last, however, because of his infirmities, and he quickly faced exile to Denmark.

Jón's continued resistance is thought to have come from a primitive sense of nationalism and raw ambition as much as religion. He resented the Danes' changing the religious landscape of Iceland and felt the island's culture would be less disrupted by staying Catholic. Jón took encouragement from a letter of support from Pope Paul III in continuing his efforts against the Lutheran cause and fighting for a Catholic Iceland. In this struggle Jón had the help of his illegitimate children, who fought with him in various battles. However, at the Battle of Sauðafell, Jón and two of his sons, Ari and Björn, were captured by his greatest adversary, Daði Guðmundsson. The three were taken prisoner and handed over to the king's bailiff. According to legends, on hearing of Jón's capture, one of his daughters rallied her forces to save him, but her efforts proved unsuccessful.

In 1550, Jón, Ari, and Björn were beheaded, ending his campaign for a Catholic Iceland. Christian Skriver, the king's bailiff who pronounced the bishop's death sentence, was later killed by fishermen who favored Jón's cause; they were rumoured to have been persuaded to assassinate him by Jón's powerful and wealthy daughter Þórunn Jónsdóttir. Skriver's death was as much personal revenge for Jón's death as it was born of any sectarian strife between Catholics and Lutherans.

== Legacy ==
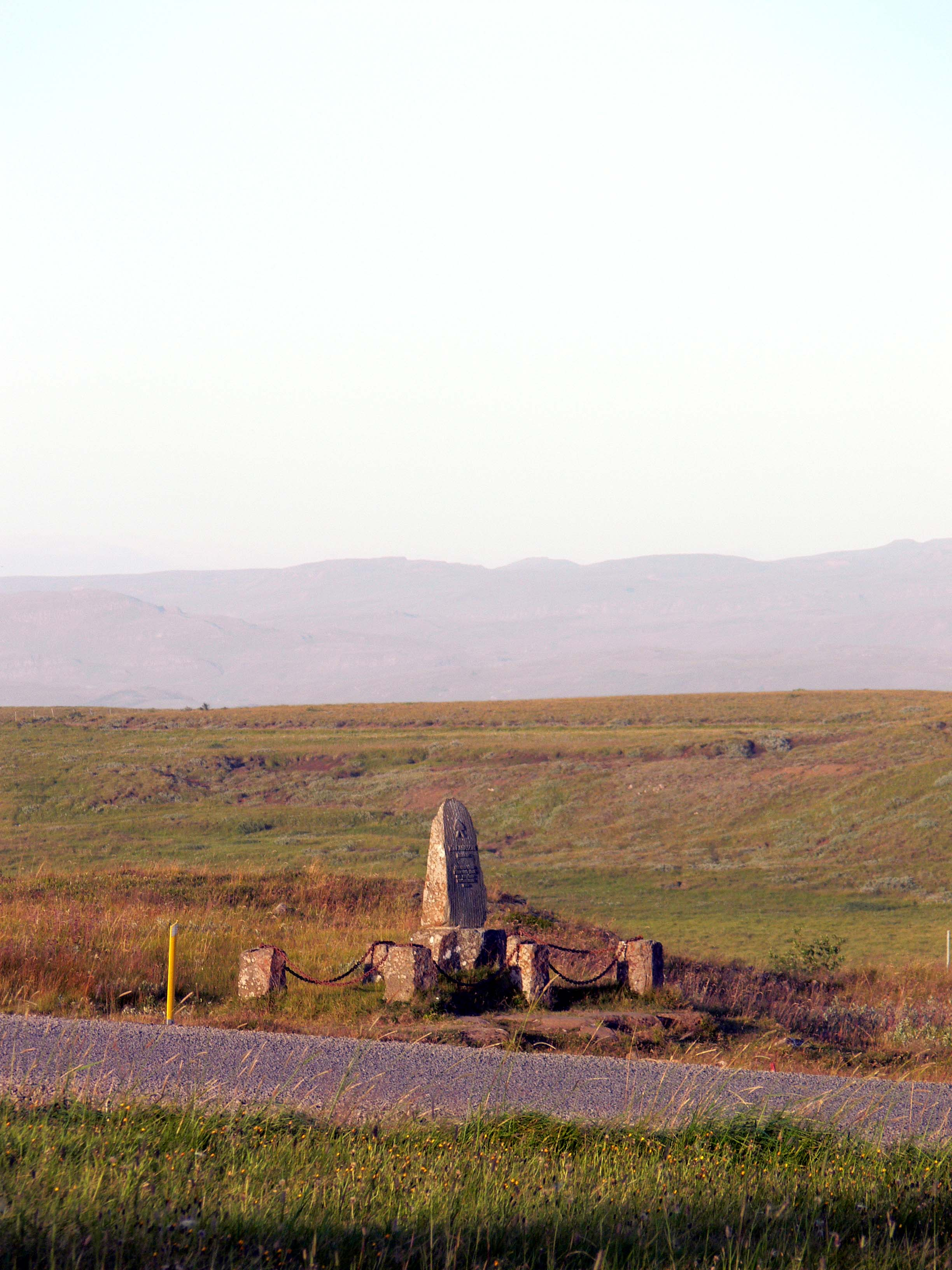
Memorial at the place of execution of Jon Arason, in Skálholt, south Iceland

Legends claim that as he was about to be beheaded, a priest called Sveinn was by his side to offer him comfort. Sveinn told Jón: Líf er eftir þetta, herra! ("There is a life after this one, Sire!") Jón turned to Sveinn and said: Veit ég það, Sveinki! ("That I know, little Sveinn!") Ever since veit ég það, Sveinki has been a part of the Icelandic treasury of sayings, in this case meaning that something totally obvious has been stated.

Gunnar Gunnarsson wrote Jón Arason (Copenhagen: Gyldendal, 1930), a fictionalized account of the life of Jón. Originally written in Danish, the book has been translated into other languages, including English.

== Sources ==
- This article incorporates text from the 1913 Catholic Encyclopedia article "Arason Jón" by E.A. Wang, a publication now in the public domain.
