= Kári Sölmundarson =

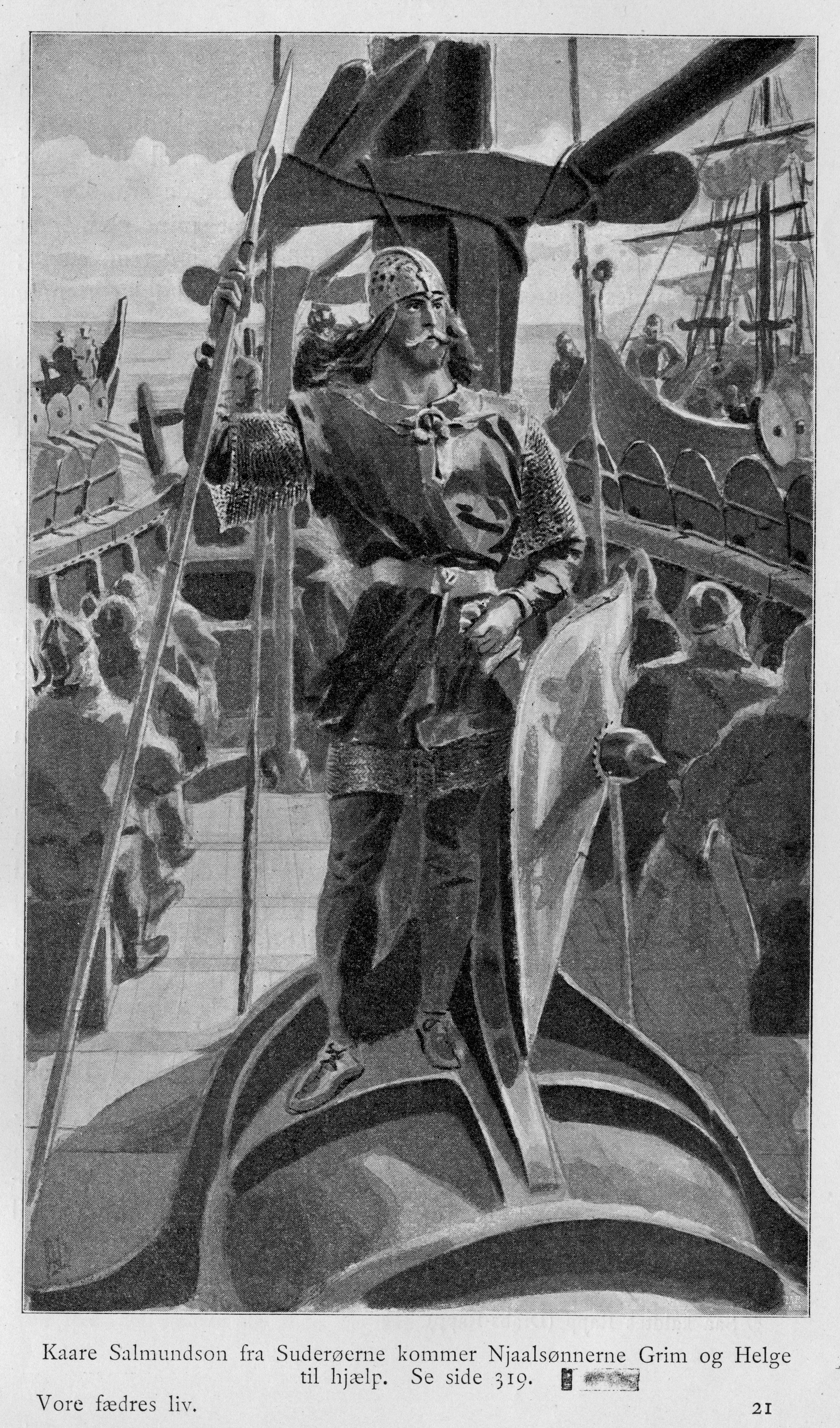
Kári Sölmundarson on his voyage taking vengeance and hunting down the burners.

Kári Sölmundarson (Modern Icelandic: [ˈkʰauːrɪ ˈsœlˌmʏntarˌsɔːn]; Old Norse: Kári Sǫlmundarson [ˈkɑːre ˈsɔlˌmuntɑz̠ˌson]) was a Hebridean viking and soldier of fortune who lived in the late tenth and early eleventh centuries. He is a major character in Njál's Saga. Kári was the son of Solmund, who was the son of Thorbjorn "Jarl's Champion," an Icelander exiled before the establishment of the Althing for murder.

== Early career ==
It is unknown where Kári was born (though possibly Iceland). He was, however, a hirdman of Sigurd the Stout, jarl of Orkney. He came to the rescue of Helgi Njálsson and Grim Njálsson, the sons of Njáll Þorgeirsson of Bergthorshvoll, Iceland in the 990's. The brothers, who were on a trading expedition to the British Isles, had come under attack by the vikings Snaekolf and Grjotgard Mordansson. After killing the raiders, Kári brought the Njálssons to Orkney, where they stayed for a time at Jarl Sigurd's court and fought in his campaigns in northern and central Scotland.

Kári came to the aid of Helgi and Grim again when the brothers were arrested by Hakon Jarl of Norway for indirectly aiding in the escape of their fellow Icelander, Thrain Sigfusson.

== In Iceland ==
When Helgi and Grim returned to Iceland, Kári accompanied them. He bought a landholding at Dyrholmar, but settled at Bergthorshvoll, where he married Njál's daughter Helga and became close friends with Njál's son Skarphéðinn. He likely became at least nominally a Christian when Iceland converted during the Althing of 1000.

Kári became entangled in the Njálssons' blood feud with the clan of Thrain Sigfusson, and participated in Skarphéðinn's ambush and murder of Thrain. In around 1010, Thrain's allies and kinsmen, led by Flosi Þórðarson, attacked Bergthorshvoll and burned it with its inhabitants inside. Kári managed to escape under cover of smoke, but his friends Helgi and Skarphéðinn were both killed. Njál, his wife Bergthora, and Kári's son Thord all refused Flosi's offer of reprieve and died in the flames.

Kári's sword was Fjörsváfnir.

== Aftermath of the Burning ==
Kári gathered supporters and prompted the prosecution of the Burners, and there is a legal joust between the parties. Fighting broke out and almost escalated into a full-scale civil war until Snorri Goði and his followers separated the belligerents. As part of an imposed settlement, the Burners were exiled for three years, but Kári attacked them on their way home, and pursued those who escaped abroad. Kári and a small group of followers spent the next several years taking vengeance on the Burners, following them to Orkney and Wales. In a particularly brazen display, Kári entered the hall of Jarl Sigurd of Orkney as Gunnar Lambason was telling a slanderous version of the story of the burning of Bergthorshvoll. Kári killed Gunnar and composed the verse:

Men bold of battle,
boast of the burning of Njál.
But have you heard,
how we harried them?
Those givers of gold had a good return,
ravens feasted on their raw flesh.

Kári stayed in Caithness during the Battle of Clontarf in 1014, when Jarl Sigurd and his allies fought against Brian Boru, High King of Ireland. During his stay in Scotland his wife Helga died. Flosi returned to Iceland after a pilgrimage to Rome. Kári followed, but was shipwrecked near Flosi's home. Testing Flosi's nobility he went to him for help, and they arranged a final peace. Kári married Flosi's niece Hildigunn, who was the widow of Hoskuld Thrainsson, the son of Thrain Sigfusson and foster-son of Njál.

== Descendants ==
Kári had four children with Helga, his first wife: his son Thord, who died during the Burning of Bergthorshvoll, and the daughters Thorgerd, Ragnheid, and Valgerd.

By his second wife Hildigunn, Kári had three sons: Starkadr, Thord and Flosi.

== Resources ==
- Cook, Robert, trans. Njál's Saga. Penguin Classics, 2002.
- Durrenberger, E. Paul. "Icelandic Saga Heroes: The Anthropology of Natural Existentialists." Anthropology & Humanism Quarterly, February 1984, Vol. 9, No. 1, pp. 3–8.
- Hudson, Benjamin. "Brjan's Saga." Medium Aevum, 22 September 2002.
- Miller, William Ian. Bloodtaking and Peacemaking: Feud, Law, and Society in Saga Iceland. Univ. of Chicago Press, 1990.
- Thorsson, Ornulfur, and Bernard Scudder, transl. The Saga of Grettir the Strong. Penguin Classics, 2005.
