= Bergþóra Skarphéðinsdóttir =

10th-century Icelander and Njáls saga character

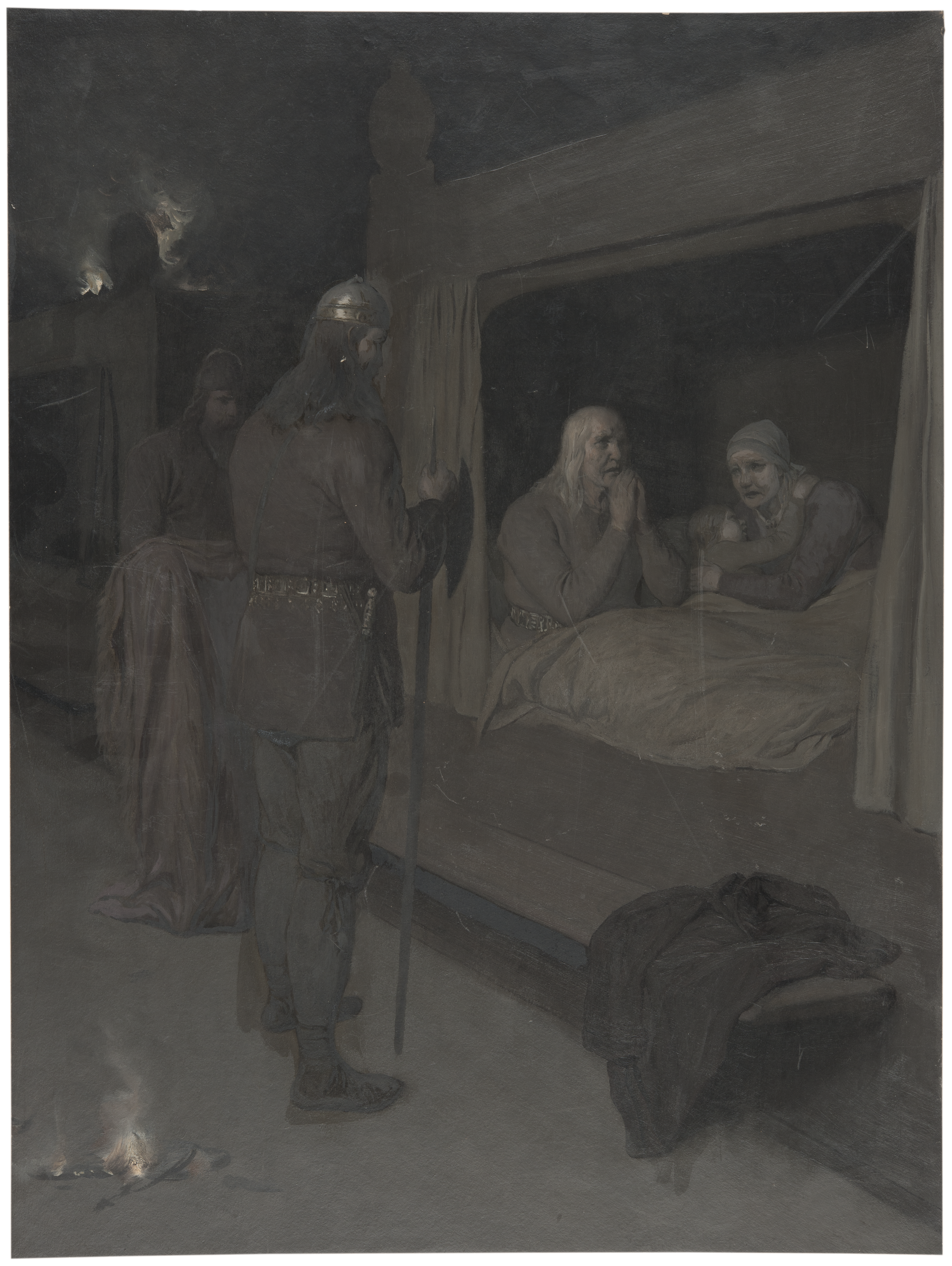
Bergþóra with her husband and grandsson in a late 19th-century painting by August Malmström

Bergþóra Skarphéðinsdóttir (anglicised as Bergthora Skarphedinsdottir) was a 10th-century Icelandic woman who appears as a character in Njáls saga as an inciter of its main feud.

== Njáls saga ==
Bergþóra is introduced in the saga as 'an exceptional and courageous woman, but a little harsh-natured.' She is the daughter of Skarp-Heðinn, and married to the lawspeaker Njáll Þorgeirsson. They have three sons: Skarp-Heðinn, Grímr, and Helgi. Njal also has an illegitimate son, Höskuldr Njálsson, with his concubine, Hróðný. Hróðný has a long-term relationship with Njal and views Bergþóra as her rival. The family lives at Bergþórsvoll.

At an autumn feast hosted by Njáll and Bergþóra, Bergþóra enters into a quarrel with Hallgerðr Höskuldsdottir, the wife of Njáll's friend Gunnar Hámundarson. Despite Gunnar's and Njal's efforts to peacefully settle the disagreement, Hallgerðr and Bergþóra escalate it to violent proportions. The women repeatedly send men to kill members of each other's households. At first Bergþóra hires passers-by to carry out the killings, but she ends by goading her sons into carrying them out. The killings are escalated each time, reflected in the increasing amount of compensation set for each crime.

The feud reaches its peak with people from Gunnar's household burning Njáll and his family inside their house. Bergþóra is offered the opportunity to leave the house, but chooses to remain with Njáll and share his fate. They retreat to their bed, commit their souls to God, and die in the fire.

== Reception ==
Scholars have pointed out Bergþóra's loyalty and her position of influence. She is compared favourably to Hallgerðr as 'strong, sane and faithful' by Stefán Einarsson, but Hannett points out that Hallgerðr and Bergþóra are both described as 'hard-hearted'. Bergþóra's influence is demonstrated in her power over her household, which allows her to hire servants for use as assassins, and in her ability to goad her sons.

It has been suggested that the thirteenth-century figure Steinvör Sighvatsdóttir might have influenced the portrayal of Bergþóra.
