= Kesja =

Kesja is an Old Norse word that may refer to:

- a Viking weapon, probably a kind of polearm, used by Scandinavians during the Viking age
- Harald Kesja, a son of Eric I of Denmark
