= Viking halberd =

Phrase referring to several Viking polearms

The term "halberd" has been used to translate several Old Norse words relating to polearms in the context of Viking Age arms and armour, and in scientific literature about the Viking Age. In referring to the Viking Age weapon, the term "halberd" is not to be taken as referring to the classical Swiss halberd of the 15th century, but rather in its literal sense of "axe-on-a-pole", describing a weapon of the more general glaive type.

== Instances in literature ==
In English translations of sagas, "halberd," "bill," or other terms have been used to translate several different Old Norse words. It is thus difficult to know what kind of weapon is being described in these translations, or the original texts. Many of these terms are shown below.

=== Atgeir ===
The atgeir was a type of bill or halberd, from Old Norse geirr, "spear". The atgeirr is thought to have been a foreign weapon and is rarely mentioned in the sagas, but is famous as the favorite weapon of Gunnar of Hlíðarendi. In Njál's saga this weapon is shown as used mostly for thrusting, but also for hewing.

- Gunnar wins his atgeirr early in Njáls saga: "Hallgrímr lagði til hans atgeirinum. Slá ein var um þvert skipit, ok hljóp Gunnar aptr yfir öfugr; skjöldr Gunnars var fyrir framan slána, ok lagði Hallgrímr í gegnum hann ok svá í slána. Gunnar hjó á hönd Hallgrími, ok lamðiz handleggrinn, en sverðit beit ekki, fell, þá niðr atgeirinn; Gunnar tók atgeirinn ok lagði í gegnum Hallgrím. Gunnar bar atgeirinn jafnan síðan." In English: "Hallgrim thrust at him with his bill. There was a boom athwart the ship, and Gunnar leapt nimbly back over it, Gunnar's shield was just before the boom, and Hallgrim thrust his bill into it, and through it, and so on into the boom. Gunnar cut at Hallgrim's arm hard, and lamed the forearm, but the sword would not bite. Then down fell the bill, and Gunnar seized the bill, and thrust Hallgrim through..."
- Gunnar was able to fight with sword in one hand and his atgeirr in the other: "Tók ek þá sverðit ok vá ek með annarri hendi en lagða með atgeirinum annarri hendi..." or in English: "Then I took my sword, and I smote with it with one hand, but thrust at them with my bill with the other..."
- Gunnarr was deadly with the atgeirr: "Gunarr leggr í móti atgeirinum, ok kom á Egil miðjan. Gunnar vegr hann upp á atgeirinum ok kastar honum út Rangá.... Lítlu síðar skýtr Gunnarr til Barkar atgeirinum, ok kom á hann miðjan ok í gengum hann ok niðr í völlinn." In English: "Gunnar thrusts at him with the bill and struck him in the middle, and Gunnar hoists him up on the bill and hurls him out into Rangriver.... A little while after Gunnar hurls the bill at Bork, and struck him in the middle, and the bill went through him and stuck in the ground."
- Eyrbyggja Saga has: "Þú skalt fara til Helgafells, ok ganga í lopt, þat er þar er yfir útidurum, ok rýma fjalir í gólfinu, svá at þú fáir þar lagt atgeir í gegnum; en þá er Snorri gengr til kamars, þá skaltu leggja atgeirnum í gegnum loptsgólfit í bak Snorra svá fast, at út gangi um kviðinn...", or in English "Thou shalt go to Holyfell and get into the loft that is over the outer door, and pull up the boards of the floor, so that thou may'st thrust a bill therethrough; then when Snorri goes out to his privy, thou shalt thrust the bill through the floor of the loft into his back so hard that it may come out at his belly...".
- The 1250 King's Mirror, also known as Konungs skuggsjá or Speculum Regale mentions the atgeirr: "Blýsteyptir hersporar ok góðir atgeirar eru ok góð vápn á skipi," or in English: "Lead-cast caltrops and good halberds are also effective weapons on shipboard."

=== Hǫggspjót ===
The hǫggspjót (lit. 'hewing spear') compounds the words hǫgg (lit. 'hew'), meaning "strike, blow, slaughter, beheading", with spjót ("spear").

- Egil's saga has: "Egill hafdi... hauggspiót í hendi." (c.934), or in English: "Egill had... a halberd in his hand." Elsewhere, Egil's spear is called a kesja (cf).
- In Færeyinga saga there is: "...hafði rauðan kyrtil, hjálm á höfði, ok girðr sverði ok höggspjót í hendi...", or in English: "...he had a red tunic, a helmet on his head, a sword girded on and a halberd in his hand..."
- Víga-Glúms saga has "Glúmr hafði skjöld sinn og höggspjót, gyrðr sverði..." or in English: "Glúmr had his shield, halberd, and a sword girded on..."

=== Kesja ===
The kesja was another halberd-type weapon. The name is thought to come from Celtic-Latin gæsum. The Cleasby and Vigfússon dictionary notes that "kesja, atgeir and höggspjót appear to be the same thing". It's interesting to note that Egils saga shows the kesja being thrown like a javelin or spear, and describes it in detail, calling it also a "mail-piercer" (brynþvarar):

- "Kesiu hafdi [Þórólfr] í hendi; fiödrin var tveggja álna laung, og sleginn fram broddur ferstrendr, en upp var fiödrin breid. Falrinn bædi lángr ok digr. Skaptið var eigi hæra enn taka mátti hendi til fals ok furduliga digrt. Iárnteinn var í falnum ok skaptid allt iárnvafit. Þau spiót voru kaullut Brynþvarar." (c.934), or in English: "The thrusting-spear [Thorolf] carried had a blade two ells long (38.75" or 98.4 cm) with four edges tapering to a point at one end, broad at the other. The socket was long and wide, the shaft no taller than might be grasped at the socket by the hand, but wonderfully thick. An iron spike was in the socket and the whole of the shaft was bound with iron. It was the kind of spear that is called a halberd."
- "Ok ádr þeir mættiz þá skaut hvarr kesiu at audrum. Egill lauft skilldinum vit kesiunni ok bar hallan sva at kesian reist or skilldinum of slaug í völlin." (c.934), or in English: "And just before they met, each flung his halberd at the other. Egill let his shield take the halberd, holding it aslant so that a piece was sliced away, then the halberd fell to the ground."
- Even the late 13th century Karlamagnus Saga has a mention: "Þá lagði Oddgeir til hans ok í gegnum skjöld hans ok brynju, ok svá at á hol gékk kesjan", or in English: "Then Oddgeir struck him and pierced through his shield and armor, so that the halberd pierced him through."

The kesja would thus have a blade around 90 cm in length with a diamond cross-section at the end, and an additional spike attached to the socket, whose placement and purpose is not explained. The length of the weapons' shaft is unclear, but was either shoulder-height, or long enough that a man reaching up could still touch the socket.

=== Krókspjót ===
The krókspjót was a barbed spear, literally "hooked spear", from Old Norse krókr, "hook, anything crooked", and spjót, "spear" (cf. höggspjót, above). The krókspjót resembled a regular spear, except that it had two lugs or "wings" attached at the bottom of the spearhead, somewhat like a boar-spear. Additional hook-spear types have been found from the period, used for hunting fish, seal and whale.

- Grettir's saga tells of how fearsome this weapon could be: "...yfir sæng Þorfinns hangir krókaspjót et stora.... [Grettir] tvíhendi spjótit á Þóri miðjum... svá at þegar gekk í gegnum hann. Fjöðrin var bæði löng ok breið á spjótinu. Ögmundr illi gekk næst Þóri ok hratt honum á lagit, svá at allt gekk upp at krókunum. Stóð þá spjótit út um herðarnar á Þóri ok svá framan í brjóstit á Ögmundi: steyptuz þeir báðir dauðir af spjótinn." Or in English: "...over Thorfinn's bed hangs the barbed spear.... [Grettir] thrust the spear with two hands in Thorir's middle... so that it went through him at once. The spear-head was both long and broad. Ögmundr the Evil ran into Thorir and pushed him on, so that the spear went through up to the barbs. The spear stood out of Thorir's back between the shoulderblades and entered the breast of Ogmund: they both fell dead, pierced by the spear."
- The Gulathing Law says: "En þat er hit þriðia misvigi ef maðr er lostenn krocoro. æða krocspiote. oc þarf at skera til." In English: "The third [form of] dishonorable manslaying is wounding a man with a barbed arrow or barbed spear, so that [the head] has to be cut out."

=== Skeggøx ===
The skeggøx, literally "bearded axe", was called so because while the blade was narrow at the haft, it widened downwards towards its edge, so that the "face" of the axe seemed to have a drooping "beard". The name is from Old Norse skegg, "beard" and øx, "axe".

- Egils saga mentions a skeggøx: "[Þórdr] felldi honum í hendr skeggexi eina. er Þórdr hafdi haft í hendi. þau vapn voro þá tíd." (c.909), or in English: "Thord gave Egil a thick-bladed axe he was carrying, common enough at that time."
- Konungs skuggsjá ("King's Mirror", 1250) recommended the skeggøx as a good weapon aboard a ship: "Á skipi eru góðir angorfsljár ok langskeptar skeggexar, slagbrandar ok stafslöngur, skeptiflettur ok allskyns annat vápngrjót..." or in English: "Longhandled scythes and long-shafted bearded axes, 'war-beams' and staff-slings, darts, and missiles of every sort are serviceable on ships..."

== Archeological evidence ==
The term "Viking halberd" was used to describe a find in North America in the 1995 book Early Vikings of the New World, but it was later demonstrated to be a tobacco cutter.

There has currently been, in fact, no clearly identified Viking halberd or bill found. Spears are the only type of polearms found in Viking graves. It is possible that halberds and bills were not part of Viking funerary customs, as opposed to other weapons that have been found in graves. Bills have been found in Frankish graves from the Merovingian period, which predates the Viking Age; but their use by the Scandinavians is not attested and, if existent, seemed to have been rare.

== See also ==
- Atgeir
