= Hallgerðr Höskuldsdóttir =

Character in Njáls saga

Hallgerðr Höskuldsdóttir was a 10th-century Icelandic woman and is a major character in Njáls saga. According to Landnámabók, she was the daughter of Höskuld Dala-Kollson and the sister or half-sister of Þorleikr, Olaf the Peacock, Helgi, Þúriðr and Þorgerðr. Her nickname there is snúinbrók (‘twisted breeches’).

== In Njáls saga ==
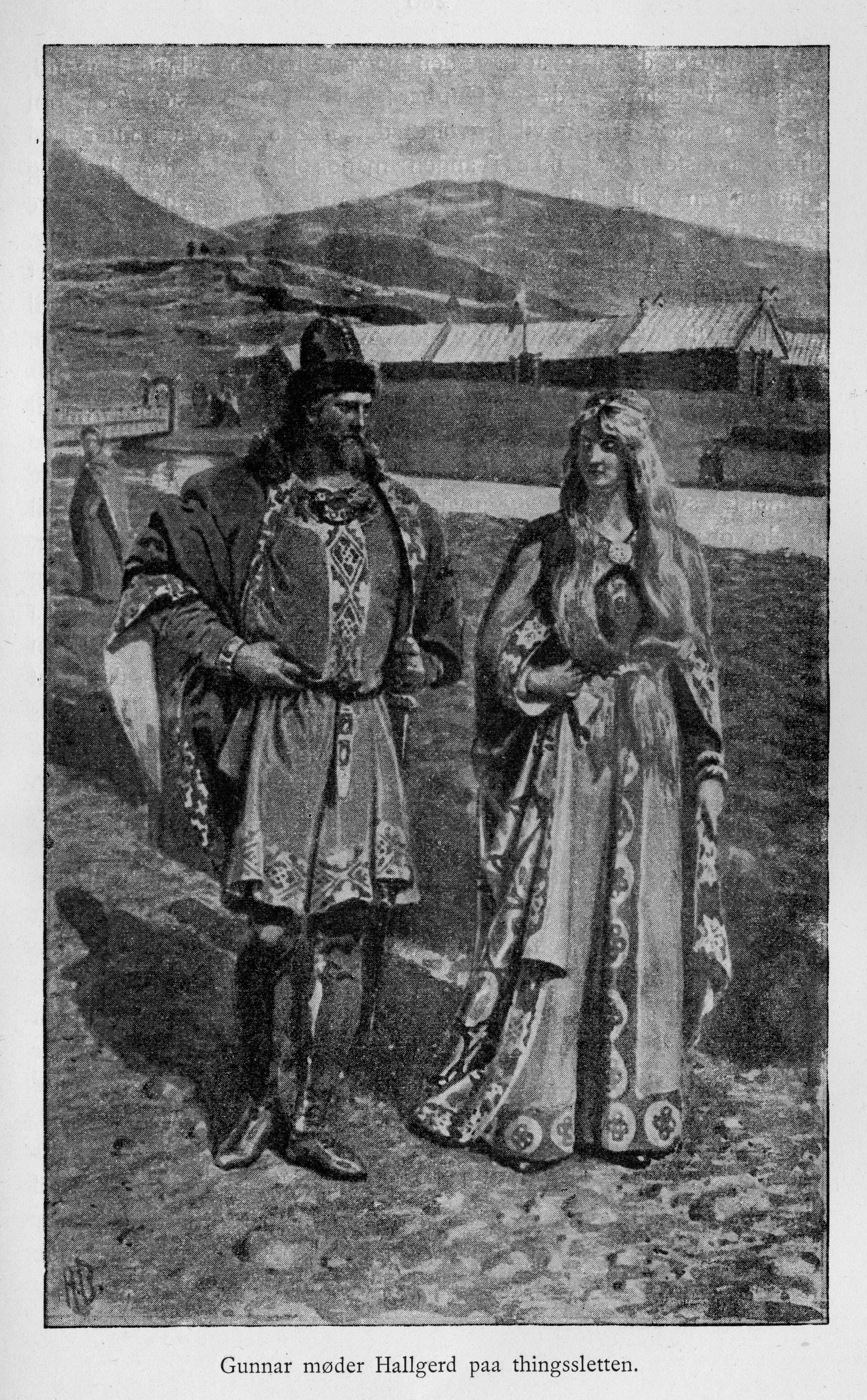
Hallgerðr meets Gunnar Hámundarson at the Althing.

Hallgerðr is the daughter of Höskuld, living at Höskuldstaðir in Laxárdal. Her mother is absent from the narrative, but it is mentioned that she has a maternal uncle who is a sorcerer. When she is a child, her uncle Hrútr predicts that many will suffer because of her beauty and offends her father by saying that she has “thief’s eyes”.

As an adult, she is described as beautiful, with hair “so long that it could veil her whole body.” She is tall, resulting in her nickname langbrók (‘long breeches’). Her personality is “impetuous and wilful.” She is said to have been negatively influenced by her violent and intransigent foster-father, Þjóstólfr.

Part of the saga follows Hallgerðr’s multiple marriages. First, she is unwillingly married to Þorvaldr Osvifsson; Þjóstólfr kills him. Her second husband is Glúmr Olafsson, with whom she has a daughter, Þorgerðr. After Glúmr slaps her, Þjóstólfr also kills him, against Hallgerðr’s wishes. Her third husband is Gunnar Hámundarson, a major protagonist of Njáls saga, whom she meets at the Althing. They have two sons, Högni and Grani.

Hallgerðr is one of the main instigators in the saga’s central feud between Gunnar and Njáll Þorgeirsson. Although the two men try to settle the feud with compensation, Hallgerðr and Njáll’s wife Bergþóra Skarphéðinsdóttir make a series of escalating retaliatory strikes against each other, sending people to murder members of each other’s households.

Finally, Gunnar is besieged in his house after breaking the terms of his outlawry. Gunnar, defending himself with a bow, asks Hallgerðr for a strand of her hair to repair his bowstring. Reminding him of the time that he slapped her in a dispute over stolen provisions, Hallgerðr refuses, and Gunnar is killed.

After the death of her third husband, Hallgerðr settles at Grjotár with her son Grani.

== Reception ==
Hallgerðr has received critical attention as the instigator of the main feud in Njáls saga. Maxwell repeatedly stresses her role as 'the root of evil' and 'the cause of evil', while Dronke understands her behaviour as 'her response to progressive disappointment in marital life.' For Clark and Hamer, Hallgerðr's nature is to be understood according to the description given by Hrútr before her marriage: it is 'very mixed,' with 'potential for honour or disgrace.'

Hallgerðr ('Hallgerd') was voiced by Lisa Hammond on the BBC Radio 3 drama The Saga of Burnt Njal, adapted by Hattie Naylor, in 2021.

== Cited texts ==
- Njál's saga. Translated by Magnus Magnusson; Hermann Pálsson. 1960.
