= Skarphéðinn Njálsson =

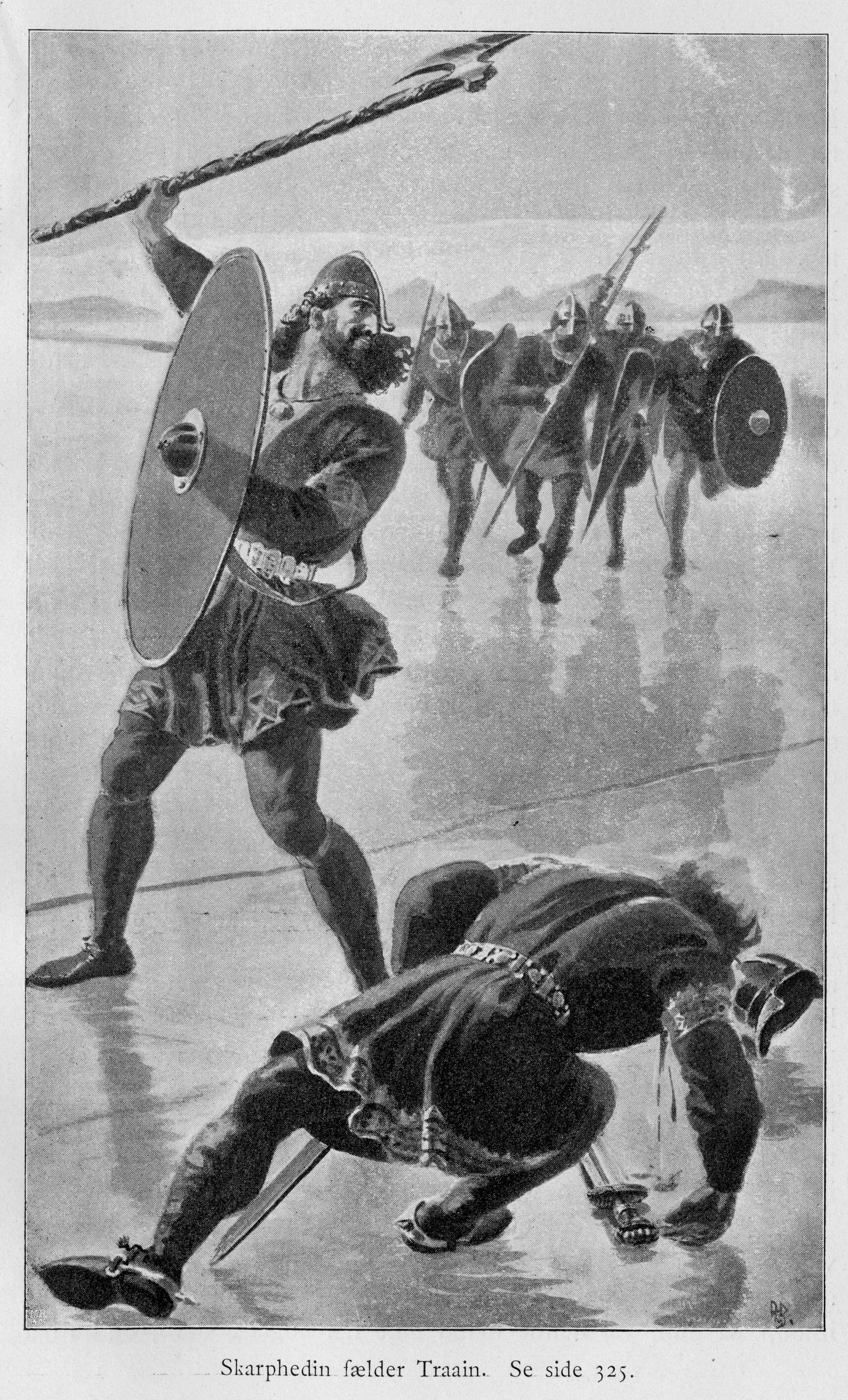
Skarphéðinn kills Þráinn Sigfússon on the ice. Illustration from "Vore fædres liv": compiled and published by Nordahl Rolfsen; translation by Gerhard Gran., Kristiania: Stenersen, 1898

Skarphéðinn Njálsson (Modern Icelandic: [ˈskar̥pˌçɛːðɪn ˈnjaulsˌsɔːn]; Old Norse: Skarpheðinn Njálsson [ˈskɑrpˌheðenː ˈnjɑːlsˌson]) was a semi-legendary Icelander who may have lived in the 10th century. He is known as a character in Njáls saga, a medieval Icelandic saga which describes a process of blood feuds. The saga is now believed to have been composed in Iceland during the period from 1270 to 1290.

The eldest son of Njáll Þorgeirsson and Bergþóra Skarphéðinsdóttir, he grew up at Bergþórshvoll in Rangárvallasýsla. The saga describes a series of feuds involving friends of Njáll and later also Njáll and his sons. Skarphéðinn is described as hardy and skilled warrior but also as an ill-tempered and sharp tongued man whose insults of potential allies at the althing ends up isolating Njáll and his family, leading to their demise as they are burned by their enemies inside their home at Bergþórshvoll.

== Biography ==
At first the feud is fueled by the anger of Hallgerður Höskuldsdóttir, wife of Njáll's friend Gunnarr, who is slighted when Njáll's wife Bergthora asks her to move away from the main table at a banquet. Hallgerd goads some of her servants to attack members of Njáll's household and Bergþóra in turn convinces some of hers to retaliate. Eventually, the Njálls' foster father Þórður Ieysingjason is killed, and dying he predicts that he will be avenged by Skarphéðinn, pulling him into the conflict. After years of intermittent feuding, Skarphéðinn causes the tide of the conflict to turn against Njáll and his family, when he kills the well-liked and innocent Höskuldr Þráinsson the priest (goði) of Hvítanes as he is sowing his field. Þráinsson is the son of Þráinn Sigfússon, who had been killed by Skarphéðinn, but taken as a foster child by Njáll. The apparently senseless act is widely condemned by members of Icelandic society, and Skarphéðinn even himself admits that it gave him an ill-reputation.

Skarphéðinn is described as a large and dangerous looking man of threatening demeanor, with prominent teeth and an ugly mouth, whose facial expression often betrays a burning rage that he is working hard to keep under control. Having been burned in the house with his father and brothers, his friends find his charred body with his eyes open and teeth biting down on his lips - and they agree that he is now less scary to them than when he was alive. He carried a long axe named Rimmugýgur (or Battle-Troll), which before his death he drove into a wooden beam of the house as it was burning down, probably to preserve its sharp edge, in order for it to be used later in avenging him. He has been interpreted as a monstrous character due to the way that he affects people around him, instilling fear by his mere presence.

"Skarphedin was the eldest, a big and strong man and a good fighter. He swam like a seal and was swift of foot, quick to make up his mind and sure of himself; he spoke to the point and was quick to do so, though mostly he was even-tempered. His hair was reddish-brown and curled and he had fine eyes; his face was pale and sharp-featured, with a bent nose, a broad row of upper teeth and an ugly mouth, and yet he was very like a warrior"

— Njal's Saga, Leifur Eiricksson (2001:44)

== Works cited ==
- Leifur Eiricksson (2001). Njal's Saga. Translated by Cook, Robert. Penguin Books. ISBN 9780140447699.
- Billado, Tracey L. (2016). Belle S. Tuten (ed.). Feud, Violence and Practice: Essays in Medieval Studies in Honor of Stephen D. White. Routledge. ISBN 9781317135579.
- Cardew, P. (2017). "What manner of man is this? Representations of monstrosity, identity and world view in early medieval narrative". Palgrave Communications. 3 (17012): 17012. doi:10.1057/palcomms.2017.12.
- Miller, William Ian (2014). 'Why is Your Axe Bloody?': A Reading of Njáls Saga. USA: Oxford University Press. ISBN 9780191014918.
- Miller, W. I. (1983). "Justifying Skarpheđinn: Of Pretext and Politics In The Icelandic Bloodfeud". Scandinavian Studies. 55 (4): 316–344. JSTOR 40918346.
