= Hlíðarendi =

Village in Fljótshlíð, Iceland

Coordinates: 63°43′29″N 19°57′02″W

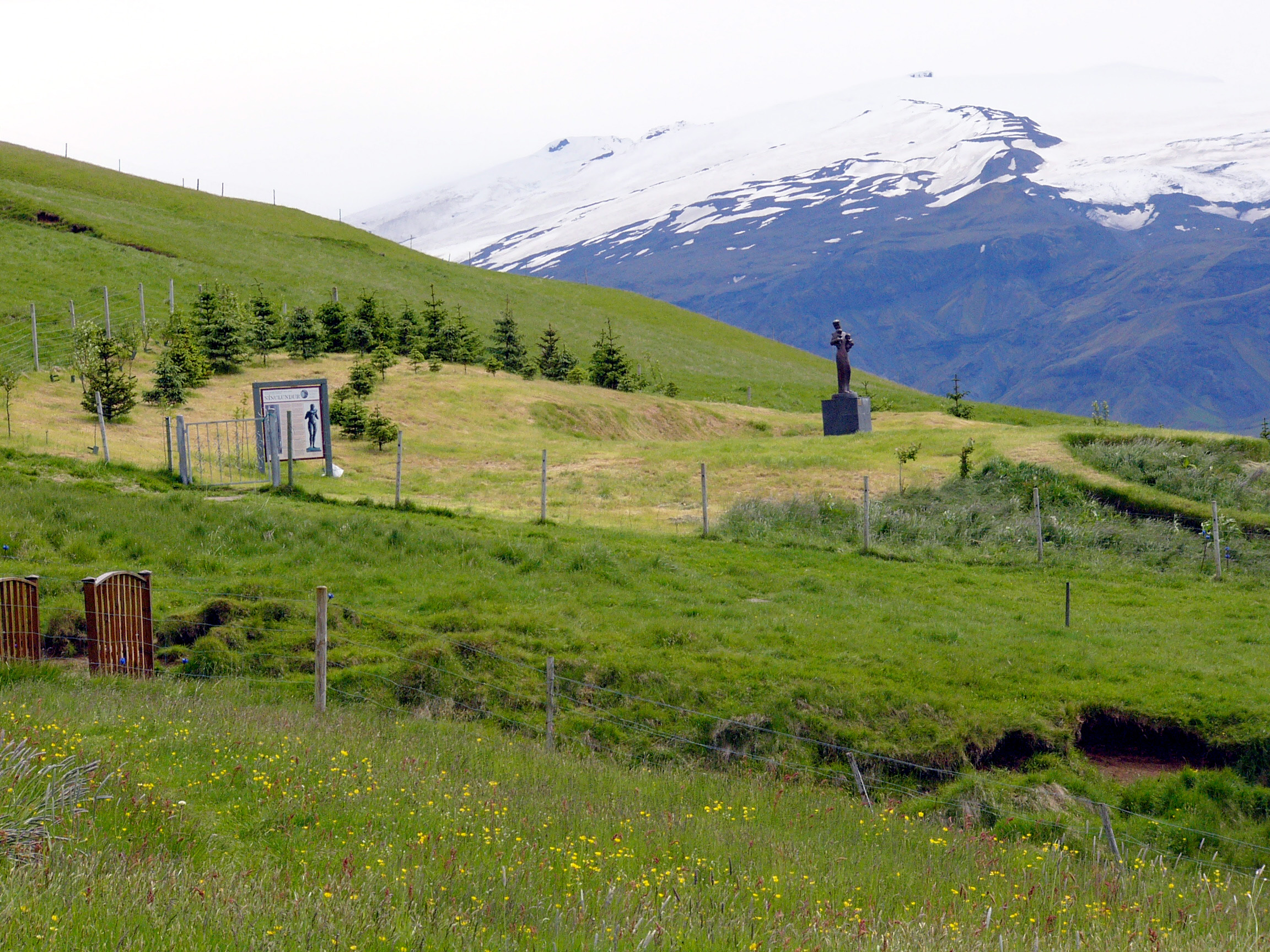
View from the churchyard of Hlíðarendi in direction of Eyjafjallajökull (zoomed)

Hlíðarendi (Old Norse pronunciation: [ˈl̥iːðarˌɛndɪ], Icelandic pronunciation: [ˈl̥iːðarˌɛntɪ]) is a famous place in Icelandic historical literature. Hlíðarendi in Old Icelandic (Old Norse) means 'Slope's End'. Gunnar Hámundarson the Viking hero from Njals Saga (Brennunjálssaga in Icelandic and Njal's Saga in English) used to live in Hlíðarendi at Fljótshlíð, and in later times there were traditional Icelandic turf covered farm houses (now gone), and a church and churchground which is still there.
