= Njálurefill =

Icelandic participatory narrative embroidery

- Njál's Saga Tapestry (English)
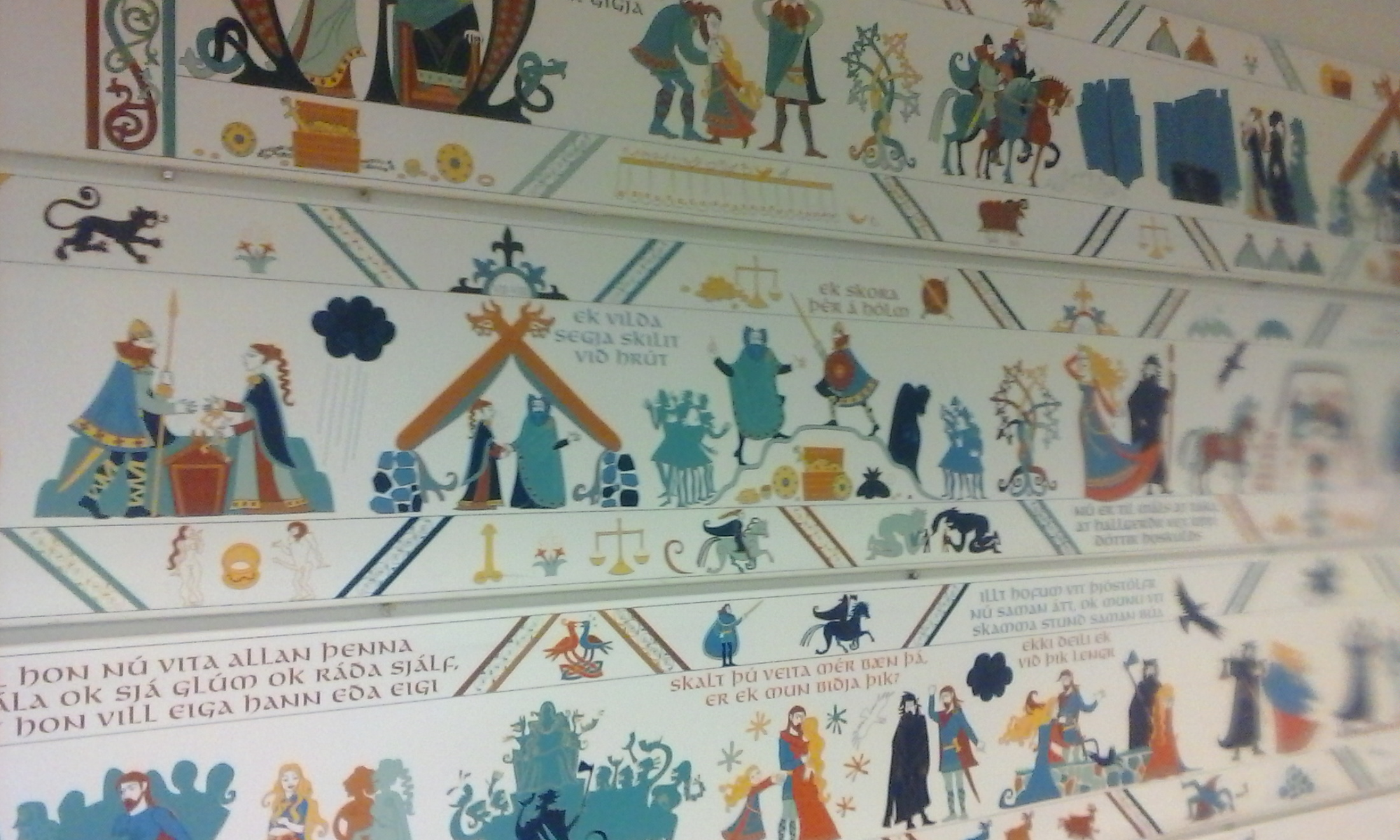
- Sections of Njálurefill displayed at the Saga Centre in Hvolsvöllur in August 2015
- Artist: Kristín Ragna Gunnarsdóttir (design and illustration); community embroiderers
- Year: 2013–2020
- Medium: Embroidery in plant-dyed Icelandic wool on linen
- Subject: Njáls saga
- Dimensions: 50 cm (20 in) high × 91.16 m (299.1 ft) long
- Location: Hvolsvöllur, Iceland
- Owner: Njálurefill ses.
- Website: www.njala.is/en

Njálurefill (also known in English as the Njál's Saga Tapestry) is a 91.16-metre (299.1 ft) participatory narrative embroidery made at Hvolsvöllur in southern Iceland. It presents Njáls saga as a continuous sequence of pictures and short inscriptions. The history teacher Christina M. Bengtsson and the regional librarian Gunnhildur Edda Kristjánsdóttir conceived and organised the project, while the artist and illustrator Kristín Ragna Gunnarsdóttir designed the full composition. The first stitch was made at the project's public launch on 2 February 2013, and the last stitches were completed on 15 September 2020.

The work is 50 centimetres (20 in) high and was embroidered with specially spun Icelandic wool on printed linen. Most of the wool was hand-dyed with Icelandic plants; blue was the stated exception because the required dye plant was not available in Iceland. Its principal filling method is refilsaumur, an Icelandic form of laid-and-couched embroidery comparable to the stitch used in the Bayeux Tapestry. Although both works are conventionally called tapestries, their designs were stitched onto an existing woven ground instead of being formed on a loom, making them embroideries in technical terms.

Visitors were invited to work beside a regular group of local embroiderers in a dedicated room at the Saga Centre in Hvolsvöllur. Participants ranged from first-time stitchers to experienced needleworkers and included children and adults. The project's logbook contains 12,518 entries recording sewing sessions by thousands of participants from 150 countries and six continents; the total records sessions, not 12,518 distinct people, because some participants returned repeatedly. The embroidery took seven years and seven months, finishing roughly three years before the original ten-year timetable.

Njálurefill received the 2014 South Iceland Education Prize for combining literary, historical and craft education with participation by people of different ages and backgrounds. A non-profit foundation, Njálurefill ses., was formed in 2021 to preserve and exhibit the embroidery and to promote knowledge of Njáls saga and refilsaumur. Plans for a purpose-designed permanent display remained in development in spring 2026. A separate five-metre (16 ft) travelling version, completed in 2024, was presented at more than twenty venues in Canada and the United States during 2025.

== Background ==
=== The saga and its South Iceland setting ===
Njáls saga, also called The Story of Burnt Njáll, is an anonymous Icelandic prose saga written in the late thirteenth century. Its 159 chapters follow several interconnected households through marriages, lawsuits, killings, settlements and renewed feuds during the late tenth and early eleventh centuries. The friendship between the warrior Gunnar Hámundarson and the lawyer and counsellor Njáll Þorgeirsson forms one of its principal relationships. Gunnar's outlawry and death occupy the earlier part of the narrative; its later movement centres on the burning of Njáll and his household, Kári Sölmundarson's pursuit of the burners, and an eventual reconciliation. The saga also incorporates the conversion of Iceland to Christianity and extended accounts of legal procedure at the Althing.

Much of the narrative is set in the lowlands of South Iceland around the present municipality of Rangárþing eystra. Hvolsvöllur lies within this landscape. The embroidery was created in Hvolsvöllur, and the current project organisation states that most of the saga's action occurs in the surrounding district.

The project translated a lengthy written narrative into a format that could be followed spatially. Instead of illustrating a single episode, the embroidery carries the story through successive scenes across its full length. Short written passages identify or punctuate the action, while the sequence of figures, buildings, ships, weapons, animals and landscape forms supplies the main narrative movement. This combination draws on the mixed use of image and inscription in medieval narrative embroidery, while Gunnarsdóttir's selection and arrangement constitute a modern visual interpretation of the saga.

=== Refill and Icelandic narrative embroidery ===
The Icelandic word refill historically denoted a long textile hanging. Fifteen Icelandic works made in laid-and-couched embroidery are known to survive. The National Museum of Iceland's 2023–2024 exhibition Creative Hands brought all of them together: the oldest date from the late fourteenth century and the latest bears the date 1677. Ten are altar frontals. The other five comprise a fragment of a horizontal wall hanging or refill, the border of an altar riddel, an altar frontlet, a bishop's portrait and an orphrey cross from a chasuble. Nine are held by the National Museum, while six were borrowed from collections in Denmark, France and the Netherlands for the exhibition.

The textile historian Elsa E. Guðjónsson identified laid-and-couched work as one of the characteristic techniques of traditional Icelandic embroidery. In refilsaumur, relatively coarse wool threads are laid closely over the surface of a design. Finer threads cross them and are secured to the ground at intervals, holding the laid threads in place. The method covers a broad area without carrying the main filling yarn repeatedly through the reverse of the cloth. Icelandic examples were normally worked in coloured wool on a linen tabby ground, although linen thread also occurs. The historical dictionary of the Árni Magnússon Institute records the earliest known written use of refilsaumur in the 1550 Sigurðarregister, while the surviving textiles establish its use in Iceland from at least the late Middle Ages.

The Bayeux Tapestry supplied the most immediate formal model for Njálurefill. The Bayeux work is itself a narrative embroidery: it consists of wool stitching on joined linen panels, is approximately 68.3 metres (224 ft) long, and combines pictures with inscriptions. Areas of colour are filled by laid threads secured with couching, often called Bayeux stitch. A woven tapestry is constructed as warp and weft interlace on a loom, whereas the image in both the Bayeux work and Njálurefill was applied by needle to cloth that had already been woven. The word “tapestry” remains part of the established titles of both works despite that technical distinction.

The long pictorial sequence and stitching method refer to the Bayeux embroidery and to Icelandic laid-and-couched work. The scenes themselves illustrate Njáls saga, and the project used Gunnarsdóttir's drawings, Icelandic wool, plant dyes and supervised public sewing in Hvolsvöllur.

== Conception and organisation ==
Bengtsson and Kristjánsdóttir developed the project while working respectively as a history teacher and regional librarian. Gunnarsdóttir, an illustrator, writer and artist with a background in literature, was commissioned to turn the saga into a continuous design. Project material credits Bengtsson and Kristjánsdóttir with the initial concept and preparation and identifies the company Fjallasaumur ehf. as the early organisational body. The project combined a commissioned visual interpretation of the saga, public instruction in an old embroidery method and an open workshop at the Saga Centre.

Public participation formed part of the plan from the beginning. The organisers invited visitors to sew under guidance instead of limiting the embroidery to a closed team of trained makers. An embroidery room, the Refilstofa, was established at the Saga Centre, where the linen was mounted on a frame and scheduled sewing sessions could be supervised. The project's 2013 launch coverage invited visitors to contribute to side images and reported that a section expected to require nine months had been completed in six.

The first stitches were taken during the formal inauguration on 2 February 2013. The initial estimate allowed at least ten years to complete between 80 and 90 metres of embroidery. Gunnarsdóttir's finished design was planned at about 90 metres, while the completed textile measured 91.16 metres. Official summaries commonly round the final length to 90 metres.

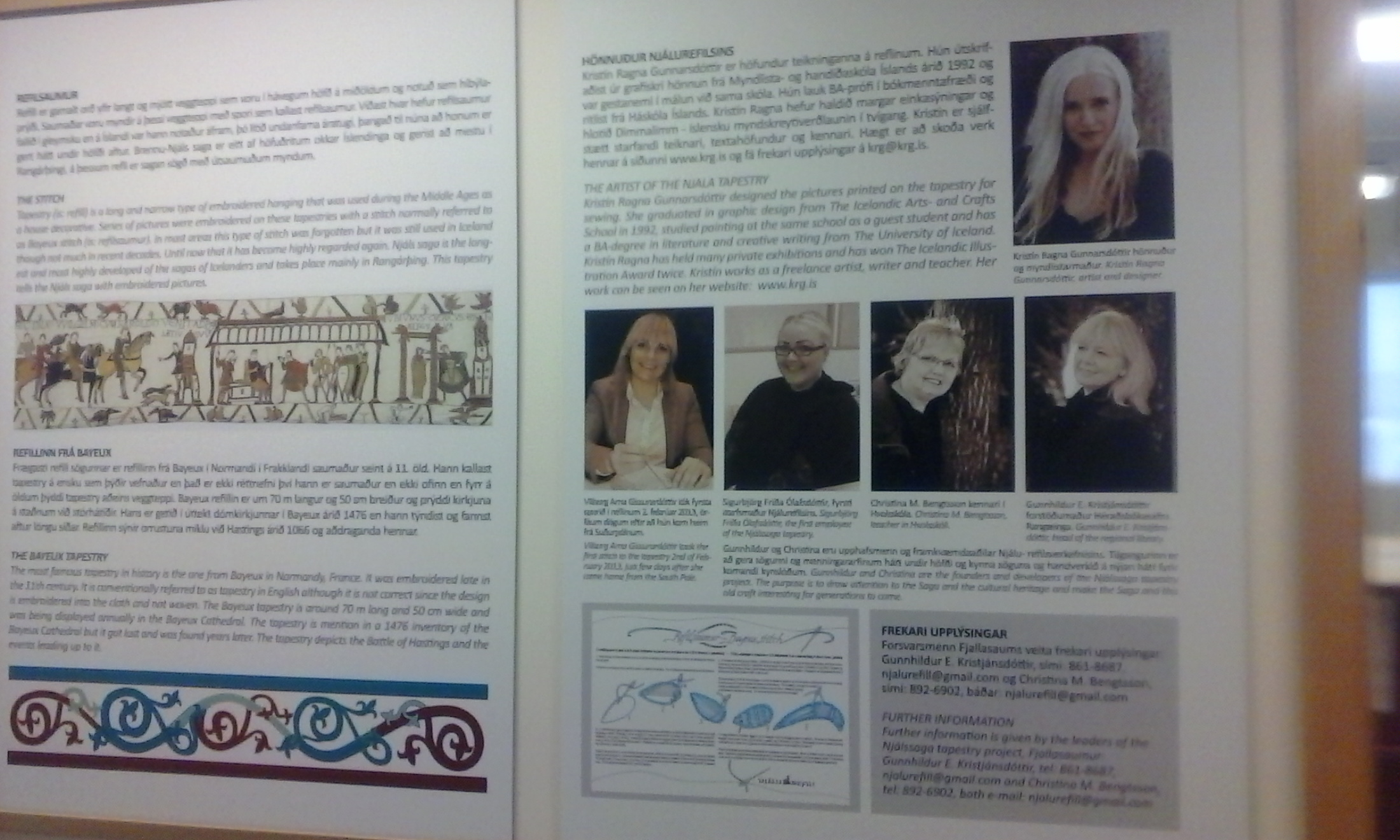
Project material displayed at the Saga Centre in August 2015. The work was produced in a dedicated embroidery room at the centre.

The project depended on a small continuing group as well as short-term visitors. Local embroiderers advanced the central scenes, prepared sections for public work, taught stitches, corrected practical problems and kept the frame active between tourist visits. Government and project records emphasise the voluntary work of women from the Rangárþing district, although the invitation to participate was open without regard to gender, nationality or prior experience. A friends' association supported the work during production, and the project held anniversary sewing sessions, marathons and other events to maintain progress.

A 25-metre section was briefly displayed in April 2014. The growing cloth otherwise remained attached to or rolled around the working frame. Partial displays, photographs, anniversary events and periodic unrollings documented its progress during production.

== Design and narrative form ==
Gunnarsdóttir drew the figures and inscriptions for the entire length before they were embroidered. The line drawings and selected text were printed onto the linen, giving the many stitchers a common template. The composition has a broad central narrative band with narrower borders above and below. Four long lines frame the border zones. These lines doubled as practice areas in which inexperienced participants could learn the outline stitch without being assigned a complex figure.

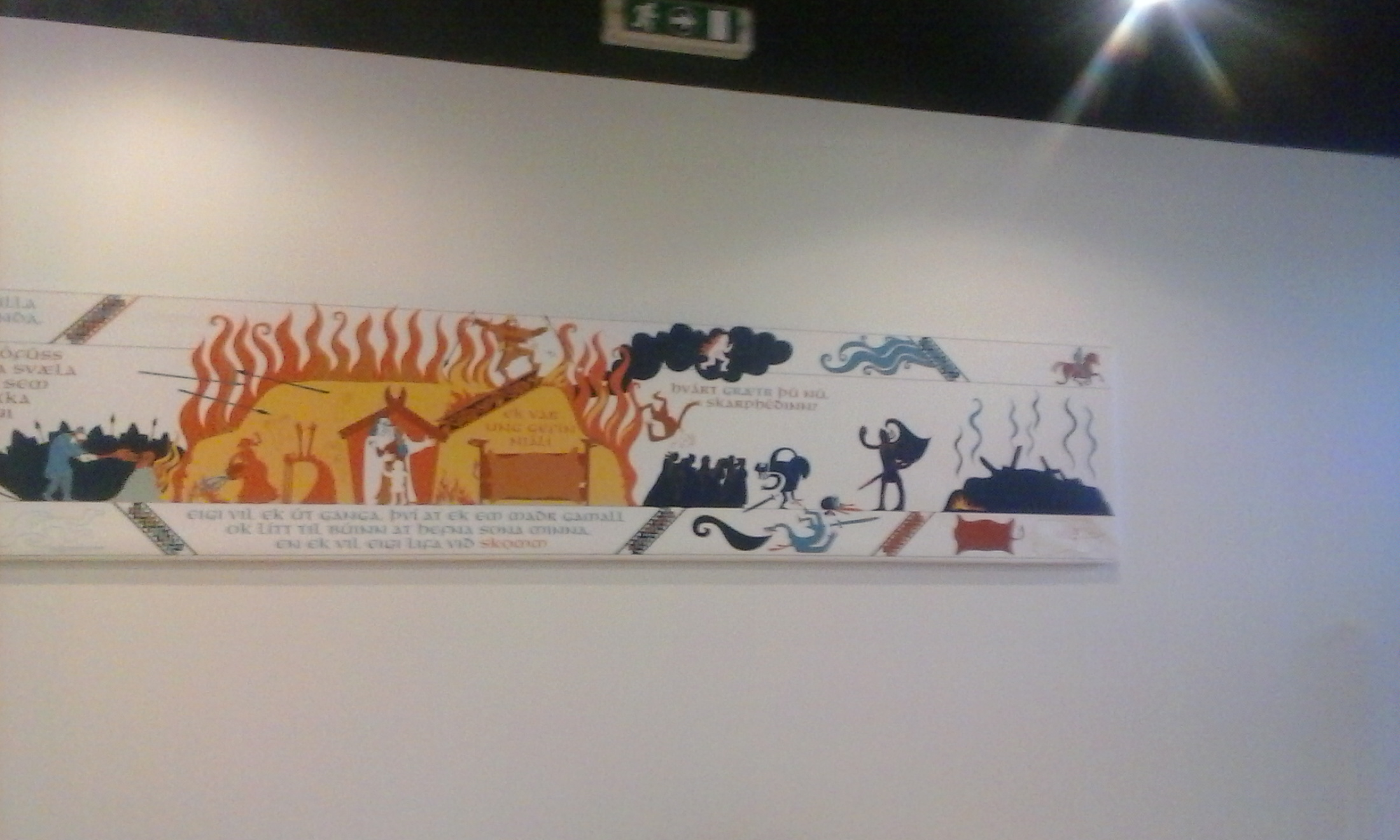
A section photographed during production in 2015, showing the central narrative band, short inscriptions and the ornamented borders.

The central band carries the principal human action in chronological order. The text consists of short excerpts; the saga's prose is not reproduced at length. Names, remarks and brief narrative cues help identify events, but the drawings carry most of the sequence. The upper and lower borders contain animals, plants, interlace and emblematic signs whose relationship to the main scene may be direct or allusive. In the system explained by the project, a turtledove signals that characters are falling in love, while an intertwined tree indicates that the fates of families are being joined.

The Bayeux model is clearest in the long horizontal format, the division between a central action field and marginal bands, the use of outlined flat figures, and the integration of words into the image. Gunnarsdóttir did not reproduce Bayeux's eleventh-century costume or Norman historical subject. Her task was to condense 159 chapters of Icelandic prose into one legible progression. The resulting sequence includes domestic exchanges, journeys, assemblies, combats, legal confrontations and the burning from which the saga takes its alternative English title.

Strong contours separate adjacent forms, while repeated border structures continue across changes of scene. The limited palette and recurring outline stitch provide a consistent framework for sections completed years apart. A published account of the finished surface notes variations in tension and stitch regularity produced by contributors with different levels of experience.

At 91.16 metres, Njálurefill is 22.86 metres longer than the surviving Bayeux embroidery, although it is narrower: 50 centimetres compared with approximately 70 centimetres for the complete Bayeux linen. The foundation's permanent-exhibition project includes a purpose-designed installation for the full sequence.

== Materials and technique ==
=== Linen, wool and dyes ===
The ground is a long, narrow linen cloth. Images and text were printed onto it before stitching, so the drawing remained visible wherever the embroidery was incomplete. During production, a working length was stretched horizontally on a sturdy wooden frame; finished fabric was rolled onto a large spool, and a new unstitched area was exposed. This arrangement kept the active section under tension while allowing a textile of more than 90 metres to be handled in a room of ordinary size.

The yarn was Icelandic wool spun specifically for the project. A published participant account identifies it as a two-ply embroidery-weight yarn and records experiments by Bengtsson and Kristjánsdóttir with dye materials including birch, rowan, lupine and poplar leaves. The Ministry of Culture and Business Affairs reported in 2024 that the wool had been hand-dyed with Icelandic plants except for the blue, because the plant needed for that colour was not found in Iceland. Natural brown, grey, black and white wool and the dyed colours together produced the restricted palette used throughout the work.

Wool and linen are also the principal materials in historical Icelandic laid-and-couched embroidery and in the Bayeux Tapestry. Njálurefill added printed outlines, a colour scheme developed for the project and scheduled public sewing to those materials and stitches.

=== Refilsaumur ===
Four stitch types were used, with contours worked before the interior areas were filled. A new participant ordinarily began on one of the long border lines, using a simple outline stitch to follow the printed drawing. After demonstrating control of the line, the stitcher could move to a border motif and learn the laid-and-couched filling method. More demanding figures and central scenes were assigned as experience allowed, while regular embroiderers supervised the work.

The filling sequence begins by laying parallel lengths of wool across the area bounded by an outline. Additional threads are placed across those long strands. Small couching stitches fasten the crossing threads to the linen, often in an offset or brick-like arrangement. Most of the coloured yarn consequently remains on the front surface. The technique economises wool, covers large shapes efficiently and permits the direction of laid threads to change around limbs, garments and curved forms.

Areas were sometimes marked with pinned notes bearing an embroiderer's name and the date on which that person began the section. This system prevented two participants from unknowingly claiming the same motif and made it possible to resume incomplete work. It also recorded individual responsibility within a collective object whose finished face otherwise contains no conventional list of makers.

The project did not require mechanically identical stitches. The practice lines and main embroidery preserve differences in tension, stitch length and regularity between experienced and first-time hands. Gunnarsdóttir's printed drawing, the restricted palette and the repeated stitch system provide the common structure, while individual contributions remain visible at close range.

== Public production ==
=== Participation model ===
The embroidery room operated as a workshop, visitor activity and production site. Members of the public could watch the work, receive instruction and add stitches during opening periods. Some participants completed only a short line during a single visit; others returned regularly and worked on major passages. Children and adults took part, and the project became an activity for local residents, domestic visitors, organised groups and international tourists.

The project's numerical record requires qualification. A news item marking the fifth anniversary stated that the tapestry had been sewn on 10,000 occasions: some people had participated innumerable times, while others, especially tourists, had sewn once. The final logbook total of 12,518 is likewise a count of recorded sewing sessions, not a verified count of unique embroiderers. Current project material states that thousands of people from 150 countries and six continents took part. The distinction explains why older reports sometimes refer loosely to more than 12,500 “people”, while the later official wording uses “entries of sewing sessions”.

Project records assign distinct roles to its makers. Bengtsson and Kristjánsdóttir organised the undertaking; Gunnarsdóttir produced its visual and textual design; a core group sustained the sewing and instruction; and occasional contributors completed bounded portions of the printed scheme. The finished work credits Gunnarsdóttir's design and its collective execution by supervised embroiderers.

The social process attracted scholarly attention before completion. In a 2017 article in the journal TEXTILE, Janis Jefferies and Kelly Thompson considered Njálurefill and the related Vatnsdæla embroidery as projects that stitched history and identity through shared physical making. They placed the projects in a discussion of how material processes can translate information and historical narrative into forms experienced through touch, duration and collective production.

=== Progress and completion ===
The frame exposed only part of the linen at a time, so measuring and rolling the completed cloth became public milestones. Project updates record the following stages:

Recorded production milestones
Date	Progress	Context
2 February 2013	First stitches	Formal public launch at the Saga Centre; the projected completion period was about ten years.
April 2014	25 metres displayed	A completed portion was placed on view for several days.
20 October 2015	45 metres; chapter 75	The project announced that at least half of the planned length had been embroidered.
12 December 2017	68 metres complete	By the fifth anniversary in February 2018, the log recorded 10,000 sewing occasions.
6 November 2018	Almost 76 metres complete; 14.3 metres remained	The section containing the burning of Njáll and his household had reached the frame.
2 February 2019	75.70 metres fully complete; the following eight metres well advanced	The reported average rate was about 13 metres per year, above the pace assumed in the ten-year plan.
15 September 2020	91.16 metres complete	The final stitches were taken after seven years and seven months.

By December 2019, contemporary press reported that only several metres remained. As the final section approached completion, the public sewing room stopped accepting casual stitching visits so that the remaining work could be managed by the continuing group. On 28 August 2020 the Icelandic government allocated ISK 25 million towards permanent exhibition facilities. The embroidery itself was finished a little over two weeks later, on 15 September.

The final measured length, 91.16 metres, exceeded the rounded 90-metre figure used during production.

== Education and community programme ==
The project taught the work in stages. A first-time visitor learned how to thread the needle, follow a printed contour and make a controlled outline stitch; more sustained work introduced laid filling and couching. Educational material used the images and inscriptions to discuss characters, place names, law and events in Njáls saga, linking craft instruction with literary and local-history study.

The project won the 2014 South Iceland Education Prize, presented on 29 January 2015 by the president of Iceland, Ólafur Ragnar Grímsson. Eleven projects had been nominated. The judging group found that Njálurefill had educational value for all age groups, brought the saga to life through the participants' own work, renewed knowledge of an old craft and allowed each contributor to acquire a direct stake in the finished object. Gunnhildur Edda Kristjánsdóttir accepted the award on behalf of the project.

A separate educational portal, Njálugáttin, was developed with support from the Association of Municipalities in South Iceland. Project managers Gunnhildur Edda Kristjánsdóttir and Eva Þengilsdóttir produced teacher guidance, student worksheets and explanatory material for younger and middle levels of compulsory school. The resources were connected to the national curriculum and designed for use in Icelandic language, visual arts and craft subjects. The programme also aimed to strengthen links among the tapestry, schools and the surrounding community.

Njálugáttin assembled reading, listening and viewing resources about the saga alongside information on the embroidery and its technique. The portal combined textual study with practical exercises that teachers could use without access to the 91-metre original.

Public events extended the programme beyond schools. Anniversary gatherings combined concentrated sewing with meals and conversation; a November 2015 programme paired a complete public reading of the saga with an embroidery marathon; and visiting groups could receive instruction in the dedicated room.

== Recognition and documentation ==
Icelandic national and English-language media followed the project from its first year. Iceland Review reported the launch and invitation to visitors in September 2013; Iceland Monitor revisited the work as it neared completion in 2019; and the national broadcaster RÚV reported in 2020 that it had finished three years ahead of schedule.

The 2014 education prize recognised the project's regional teaching role, while textile scholarship placed it within a wider field of communal narrative textiles and material approaches to history. Jefferies and Thompson's 2017 article discussed it beside Vatnsdæla á refli. The Textile Research Centre in Leiden catalogued the project as a commemorative and commissioned textile, noting its Bayeux-derived method, linen ground, Icelandic wool and local plant dyes.

From 25 to 29 April 2019, a group associated with Njálurefill visited the Bayeux Museum in France. Museum director Antoine Verney met the group and discussed the history and preservation of the Bayeux embroidery.

Gunnarsdóttir discussed the completed work at the Sigurjón Ólafsson Museum in Reykjavík in February 2024. The event announcement placed Njálurefill within the older use of embroidered hangings in Icelandic churches and elite interiors, identified its images and textual fragments as Gunnarsdóttir's interpretation, and recorded that permanent accommodation had not yet been completed.

== Ownership, preservation and permanent exhibition ==
During the final year of production, the municipality of Rangárþing eystra owned and administered the embroidery. The state allocation of ISK 25 million announced in August 2020 was intended to help create permanent exhibition premises within the municipality. Planning after completion covered the support, lighting, display and interpretation of the 91.16-metre textile.

On 30 March 2021, representatives of the tapestry project, Rangárþing eystra and the Friends of Njálurefill signed the charter establishing Njálurefill ses., a non-profit foundation. Its stated purposes are to preserve, maintain and exhibit the textile; protect the cultural and historical value of Njáls saga; sustain the practice of refilsaumur; and disseminate knowledge of both the saga and the embroidery technique. The foundation became the owner and responsible body for the completed work.

A 2024 memorandum from the Ministry of Culture and Business Affairs to the Budget Committee of the Althing set out the proposed finances of a permanent narrative exhibition. The total project cost was then estimated at ISK 145 million. According to the memorandum, ISK 75 million had been obtained: ISK 25 million from the 2020 state grant and ISK 50 million from Icelandic and foreign private donors. The foundation requested a further ISK 70 million. The memorandum records a funding request and cost estimate, not confirmation that the outstanding amount was awarded.

The proposal combined display of the textile with interpretation of the saga, handwork and the South Iceland setting. It covered the installation of the long object and the production of explanatory material.

As of February 2024 the complete embroidery was not on public display. By spring 2026, the foundation reported that a group of designers was preparing a permanent exhibition in Hvolsvöllur. It did not announce an opening date on its English-language site. Until that installation is completed, the foundation has used the shorter travelling embroidery for presentations away from Hvolsvöllur.

== Travelling Tapestry ==
The Travelling Njál's Saga Tapestry is a separate five-metre embroidered excerpt created after the main work. It covers chapters 31–45 of the saga and was completed in May 2024 by members of the continuing sewing group. Its length allows it to be transported and displayed fully unrolled in teaching and exhibition spaces while the original awaits permanent installation.

The travelling work toured Canada and the United States from April to September 2025 with Claudia Pétursson, the project's North American representative. The route began at the Society for the Advancement of Scandinavian Study conference in Minneapolis and the Icelandic National League of North America convention in Gimli, Manitoba. It continued through venues and Icelandic heritage events in British Columbia, Washington, Alberta, North Dakota, Minnesota, South Dakota and Colorado. The official schedule listed presentations, school visits, exhibitions and embroidery classes; Pétursson's retrospective counted more than twenty stops during five months.

At each location, the excerpt was used for a visual walk-through of the relevant saga episodes. Programmes also included talks about the production of the main embroidery, reading groups and instruction in Bayeux stitch. The Minnesota Historical Society listed an eight-day display in the Viking Ship Gallery at the Hjemkomst Center in Moorhead in August 2025.

The tour also raised money for the proposed permanent home. Pétursson reported that donations collected during the North American programme exceeded US$40,000. The figure was published by the tour organiser; the article did not include an audited financial statement.

Audiences did not add stitches to the completed travelling excerpt. Workshops instead taught the same laid-and-couched method, and presentations linked the handwork to the saga narrative. The foundation used the travelling version for public education while the full 91.16-metre textile remained without a permanent display.

== Related saga embroidery ==
Njálurefill belongs to a small group of modern Icelandic community embroideries based on the sagas. The closest related undertaking is Vatnsdæla á refli, a 46-metre work illustrating Vatnsdæla saga. Jóhanna E. Pálmadóttir initiated that project at the Icelandic Textile Centre in Blönduós in 2011. Twenty-two students at the Iceland University of the Arts prepared drawings under Gunnarsdóttir's direction, and members of the public were invited to help embroider the linen in refilsaumur.

Both projects use a long horizontal format, saga narratives, designs associated with Gunnarsdóttir, laid-and-couched embroidery and public participation. Vatnsdæla á refli was centred at the Icelandic Textile Centre in Blönduós and used a student design team. Gunnarsdóttir drew Njálurefill as one continuous scheme, and its workshop operated at the Saga Centre in the district where much of the saga is set.

== See also ==
- Bayeux Tapestry
- Embroidery
- Community art
- Textile arts
- Njáls saga
- Vatnsdæla saga
