= Atgeir =

Scandinavian polearm used during the Viking Age

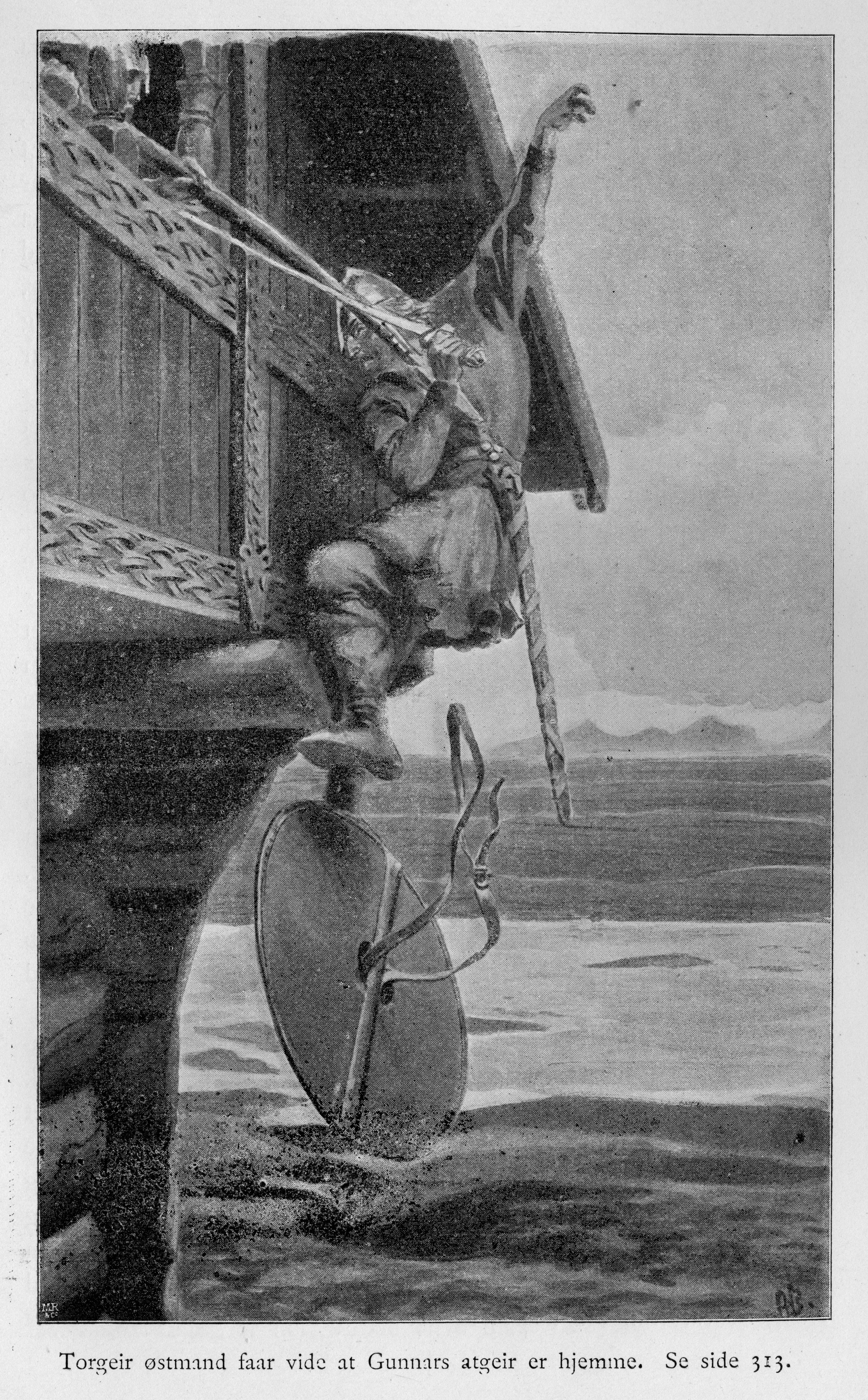
Gunnar Hámundarson defends his house with an atgeir in Njáls saga.

An atgeir was a type of polearm in use in Viking Age Scandinavia and Norse colonies in the British Isles and Iceland. The word atgeirr is older than the Viking Age, and cognates can be found in Old English and other Germanic dialects (atiger, setgare, aizger), deriving from the Germanic root gar, and is related to the Old Norse geirr, meaning spear.

Atgeirr is often translated in English as "halberd", however Germanic weapon names in gar designate a heavy spear, while geirr is just a common name for any spear in Old Norse, thus the atgeirr is "a weapon closely related to a spear – something long-shafted and thrust-oriented". The word at prefixed to the weapon's name is used in poetry for "collision, clash, fight", thus "In this context, we can understand the word atgeirr as denoting a 'battle spear' – as opposed to a light javelin or a hunting spear, it underlines the man-killing character of the weapon...".

The atgeir is most famously found in three Old Norse sagas: Brennu-Njáls Saga, Laxdæla Saga, and Eyrbyggja Saga, all of which focus on events occurring in the late 10th and early 11th century, but the earliest mention is in a verse (vísur) dated to the 11th century.

Analysis of the language describing fights with this weapon strongly suggest the atgeir was used for thrusting rather than cutting or hewing, although "...the instance where the atgeirr manages to cut (höggva) through a spear shaft indicates that it must have had a substantial blade. The lifting of impaled opponents also gives a hint about the geometry of the blade, which prevents the body from sliding down the shaft: either the spear must be quite broad, or, even better, it must have wings on the socket". This suggests that the atgeirr is related to the Viking Age Petersen type B or C spear. Other authors suggest Petersen type D spears, as well as the F, G, and H types. However, no archaeological examples have been found that have conclusively been identified as an atgeir, and there is no consensus as to which, if any of these spearhead types correspond to the weapon described in the sagas.

Another view is that the term had no association with a specific weapon until it is used as an anachronism in saga literature to lend weight to accounts of special weapons. Later the word was used for typical European halberds, and even later multipurpose staves with spearheads were called atgeirsstafir.

Arguably the most famous atgeir was Gunnar Hámundarson's, as described in Njal's Saga. According to the saga, this weapon would make a ringing sound (or "sing") when it was taken down in anticipation of bloodshed. However, Njal's saga is one of the latest and most obviously authored sagas, and details of clothing or weaponry are almost without doubt based on medieval models, not Viking ones.

== See also ==
- Viking Age arms and armour
