= Gunnar Hámundarson =

Icelandic chieftain and poet

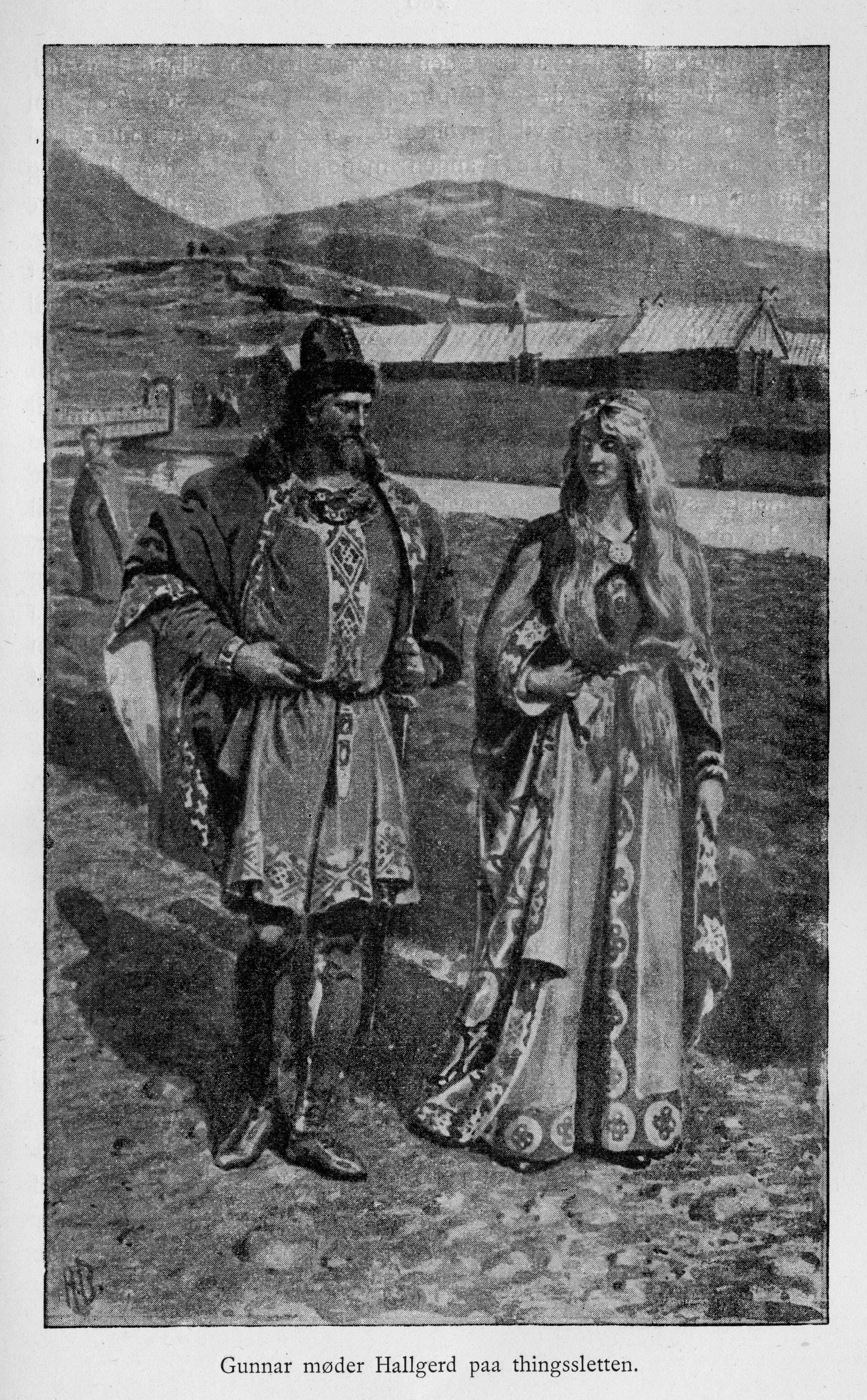
Gunnar meets his future wife Hallgerðr Höskuldsdóttir at the Alþingi

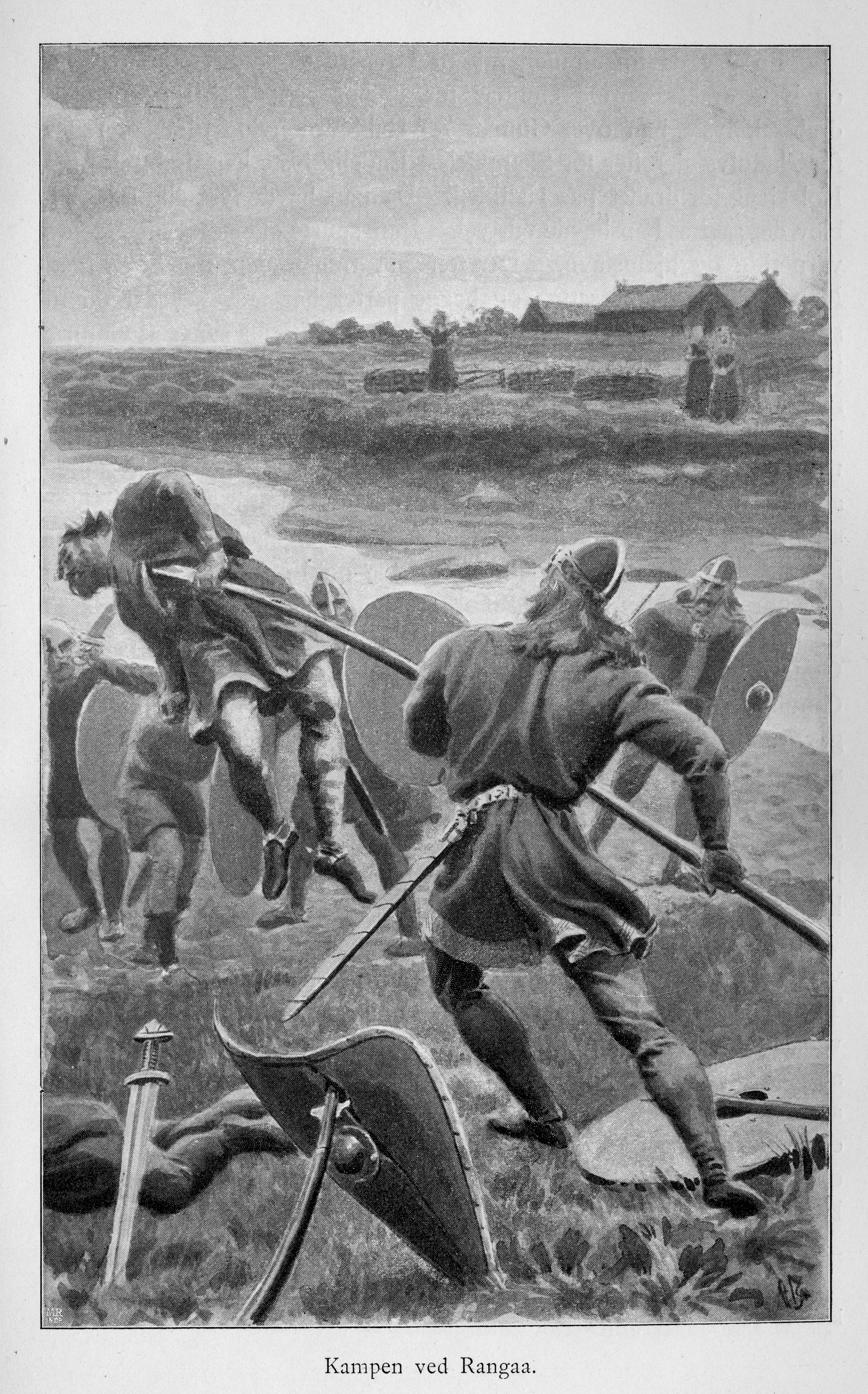
Gunnar defends himself at Rangá

Gunnar Hámundarson (Icelandic pronunciation: [ˈkʏnːar ˈhauːˌmʏntarˌsɔːn]) was a 10th-century Icelandic chieftain. He lived in Hlíðarendi in Fljótshlíð and is probably better known as Gunnar of Hlíðarendi (Old Norse: Gunnarr á Hlíðarenda). He features prominently in the first half of Njáls saga, which tells of the chain of events ultimately leading to his death in battle.

He was married to Hallgerðr Höskuldsdóttir of Höskuldsstaðir in Laxárdal in Dalasýsla, who was known as Hallgerðr langbrók ("Hallgerður longpants"). He was her third husband. It was said that she had killed both her former husbands, but she had in fact only killed the first. Their marriage was considered imprudent by Gunnar's friend Njáll Þorgeirsson, because it was caused by lust and not practicality.

== Gunnar the hero ==
Gunnar was a god-like warrior — he is described as nearly invincible in combat. According to Njáls saga, he was a powerful, athletic man "capable of jumping his own height in full body armour, both back and front". He was a skilled archer, and in close combat his weapon of choice was the atgeir, which scholars consider to have been a halberd or glaive of some sort. He was said to have taken this famed weapon in battle from a man named Hallgrímur, while on a Viking raid to the island of Eysýsla (Saaremaa in present-day Estonia - see detailed account on that page).

Gunnar was also a skilful stone-thrower, able to hit enemies between the eyes from meters away, and an excellent swimmer. There was supposedly no game at which he had an equal. He was said to enjoy the features of life, being a drinker. His behaviour was always polite, but firm — he gave good advice, and was kind and mild, yet he was not thought of as an intelligent man because of his way of talking. However, Gunnar's wise insights and deep understanding strongly suggested that he was as smart as he was handsome. He was loyal to his friends and kept good company. Gunnar has been called "handsome and beautiful of skin and had a straight nose, turned up at its tip. He was blue-eyed and keen-eyed and ruddy-cheeked with thick lustrous hair, blond and well-combed." He was described as the most beautiful man in the world, and as having no equal.

== Gunnar's death ==
Gunnar was a close friend of Njáll Þorgeirsson of Bergþórshvol and came to him often for advice. Njáll told him not to kill two men of the same family — this would lead to his death. Njáll's prediction proved right. When Gunnar killed two family members of Gissur the White, the family sought vengeance and the men set out to Hlíðarendi to do murder. Njáll advised Gunnar to leave Iceland and head abroad to escape them. Initially, Gunnar intended to depart, but when he saw his homestead from the distance, he was so moved by the beauty of it that he changed his mind and decided to remain behind. This led to the epic battle in which Gunnar was killed.

When Þorgrim and a few other grudge-bearing men were scouting around Gunnar's house, Gunnar woke up and stabbed Þorgrim through a gap with his atgeir. Þorgrim returned calmly to his comrades, who asked if Gunnar was home. “Find that out for yourselves, but I am sure of, that his atgeir is home,” he said, and then fell down dead.

At first, Gunnar managed to fight off his numerous attackers with his masterful archery. When his bowstring broke in close quarters combat, he asked his wife Hallgerður for hair from her head to mend the bow. Gunnar had slapped her previously, when he discovered his wife had stolen food from a nearby farm during a famine, and she vindictively refused. He was thus forced to confront his attackers in hand-to-hand combat and was killed as a result.

== See also ==
- Gunther
