= Njáll Þorgeirsson =

Icelandic lawyer

Njáll Þorgeirsson (Old Norse: [ˈnjɑːlː ˈθorˌɡɛirsˌson]; Modern Icelandic: [ˈnjautl̥ ˈθɔrˌceir̥sˌsɔːn]) was a 10th and early-11th-century Icelandic lawyer who lived at Bergþórshvoll in Landeyjar, Iceland. He is one of the main protagonists of Njáls saga, a medieval Icelandic saga which describes a series of blood feuds. According to Guðbrandur Vigfússon, "although it is certain, that Njáll has existed, yet the Njáll, which Njáls saga describes, has never lived."

== Biography according to the Old Norse sources ==
Njáll was the son of Þorgeir gollnir Ófeigsson. His paternal grandfather had fallen out of favour with the king and therefore decided to leave Norway but as he had prepared and was about to leave when the king's errandmen came to him and took his life. After that his grandmother and their children and her brother left for Iceland. Njáls saga does not in important events contradict other sources but in details such as genealogy it sometimes contradicts the Landnámabók which is thought more trustworthy.

Njáll lived in Bergþórshvoll and was married to Bergþóra Skarphéðinsdóttir. He is described as a kindly, wealthy, non-violent, and handsome man, but beardless, suffering from the peculiar condition of not growing any facial hair. He was a great lawyer — supposedly unequalled in wisdom and predictive powers — and solved the problems of every man who came to him for counsel. He was a close friend of chieftain Gunnar Hámundarson of Hlíðarendi.

After his sons (among them Skarphéðinn Njálsson) became involved in a dispute, the farmstead at Bergþórshvoll was surrounded by a hundred men and put on fire. By then, Njáll was an old man and was offered the chance to leave. He chose to stay and died in the fire with the rest of his family — hence Njáls saga has also been called Brennu-Njáls saga meaning "Saga of Burning Njáll".

== Other sources ==
- Full text of Njáls saga with English translation at the Icelandic Saga Database
