= Njáls saga =

Icelandic saga

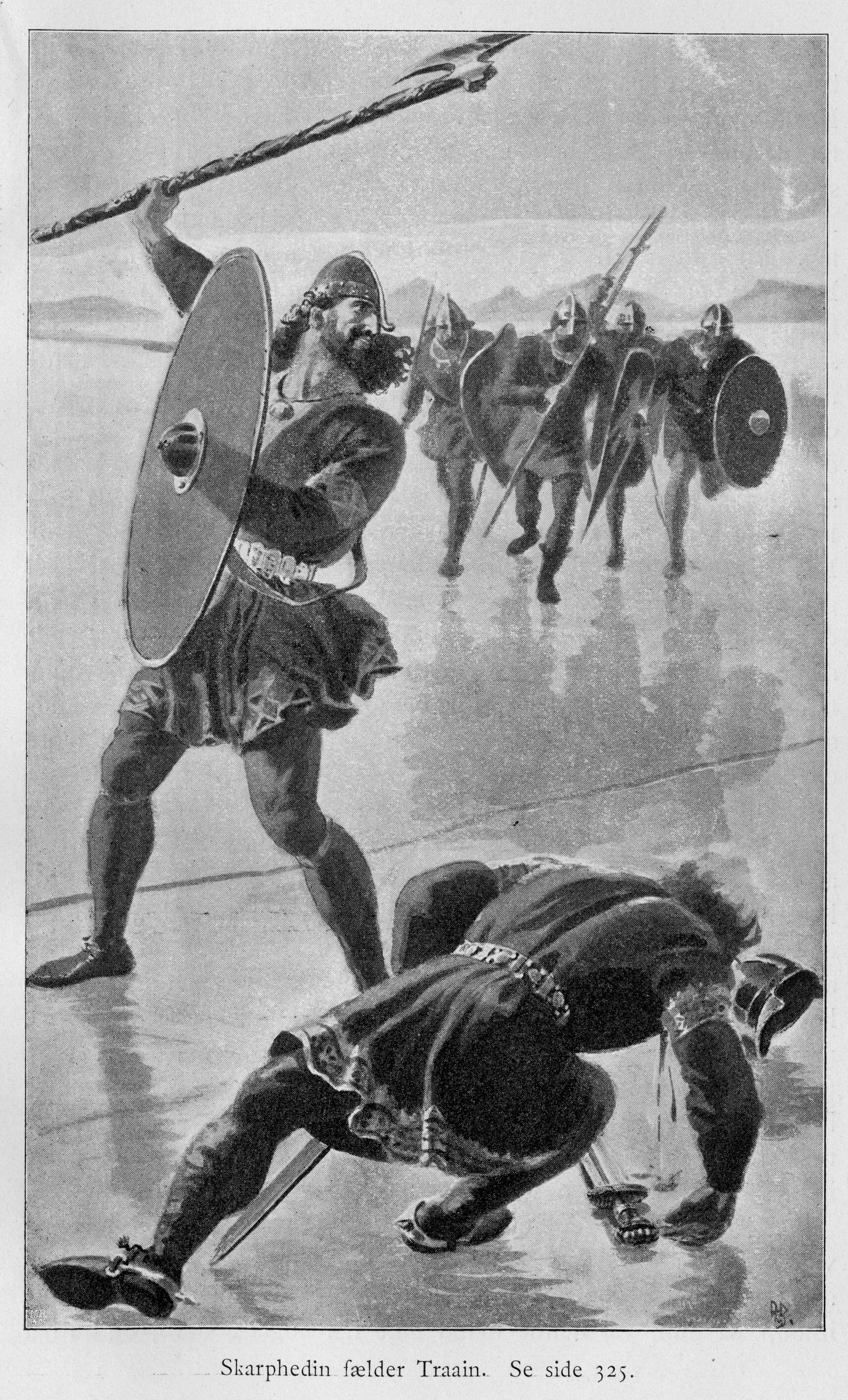
Njáll's son Skarphéðinn kills Þráinn on the ice. Family feuds feature prominently in Njáls saga.

Njáls saga (Icelandic pronunciation: [ˈnjauls ˌsaːɣa]), also Njála ([ˈnjauːla]), or Brennu-Njáls saga ([ˈprɛnːʏ-ˌnjauls ˌsaːɣa], which can be translated as The Story of Burnt Njáll, or The Saga of Njáll the Burner), is a thirteenth-century Icelandic saga that describes events between 960 and 1020.

The saga deals with a process of blood feuds in the Icelandic Commonwealth, showing how the requirements of honor could lead to minor slights spiralling into destructive and prolonged bloodshed. Insults where a character's manhood is called into question are especially prominent and may reflect an author critical of an overly restrictive ideal of masculinity. Another characteristic of the narrative is the presence of omens and prophetic dreams. It is disputed whether this reflects a fatalistic outlook on the part of the author.

The principal characters in the saga are the friends Njáll Þorgeirsson, a lawyer and a sage, and Gunnar Hámundarson, a formidable warrior. Gunnar's wife, Hallgerðr langbrók, instigates a feud that leads to the death of many characters over several decades including the killing by fire of the eponymous "Burnt Njáll".

The work is anonymous, although there has been extensive speculation on the author's identity. The major events described in the saga are probably historical but the material was shaped by the author, drawing on oral tradition, according to his artistic needs. Njáls saga is the longest and most highly developed of the sagas of Icelanders. It is often considered the peak of the saga tradition.

== Authorship and sources ==
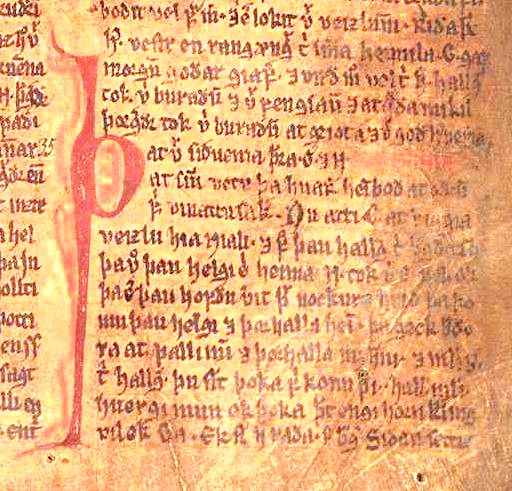
Excerpt from Njáls saga in the Möðruvallabók (AM 132 folio 13r) circa 1350

The author of Njáls saga, like the other sagas of Icelanders, is anonymous. There are, however, several hypotheses about the saga's authorship. The oldest idea, attested in the early 17th century, is that Sæmundr fróði wrote the work. Other suggested authors include Sæmundr's sons, Jón Loftsson, Snorri Sturluson, Einarr Gilsson, Brandr Jónsson and Þorvarðr Þórarinsson.

The saga is now believed to have been composed in the period from 1270 to 1290. Among written sources which the author likely used are Laxdæla saga, Eyrbyggja saga and Ljósvetninga saga as well as the lost sagas Brjáns saga and Gauks saga Trandilssonar. However, the author probably derived the bulk of the material in the saga from oral tradition, which they manipulated for their own artistic purposes. Opinions on the historicity of the saga have varied greatly, ranging from pure fiction to nearly verbatim truth to any number of nuanced views. It can be regarded as certain that Njáll and Gunnarr were real historical people and their fateful deaths are referred to in other sources. Gabriel Turville-Petre said, "It was not the author's purpose to write a work of history, but rather to use a historical subject for an epic in prose".

== Themes ==
Njáls saga explores the consequences of vengeance as a defence of family honor by dealing with a blood feud spanning some 50 years. The saga shows how even worthy people can destroy themselves by disputes and demonstrates the tensions in the Icelandic Commonwealth which eventually led to its destruction. Any insult to one's honor had to be revenged: sometimes this includes slights which seem trivial to modern readers. Magnus Magnusson finds it "a little pathetic, now, to read how vulnerable these men were to calls on their honour; it was fatally easy to goad them into action to avenge some suspicion of an insult".

Insults involving a character's manliness are especially prominent in the saga. Thus, Njáll's lack of a beard is repeatedly referred to and used by his opponents to call his manhood into question. Another example, among many, is when the gift of a silk garment is considered an insult by Flosi and a hard-won settlement breaks down as a consequence. Ármann Jakobsson has argued that it is "difficult to find a man whose manhood is not vulnerable" and that Njáls saga criticizes the idea of a misogynistic society by showing that the ideal of masculinity can be so restrictive that it becomes oppressive to men and destructive to society.

Omens, prophetic dreams and supernatural foresight figure prominently in Njáls saga. The role of fate and, especially, of fatalism is, however, a matter of scholarly contention. Halldór Laxness argued that the saga is primarily a book about the fatalism inherent in Norse paganism. In his view, the course of events is foreordained from the moment Hrútr sees the thieves' eyes in his niece and until the vengeance for Njáll's burning is completed to the southeast in Wales. In this way, Laxness believed that Njáls saga attested to the presence of a "very strong heathen spirit", antithetical to Christianity, in 13th century Iceland. Magnus Magnusson wrote that "[t]he action is swept along by a powerful under-current of fate" and that Njáll wages a "fierce struggle to alter its course" but that he is nevertheless "not a fatalist in the heathen sense". Thorsteinn Gylfason rejects the idea that there is any fatalism in Njáls saga, arguing that there is no hostile supernatural plan which its characters are subject to.

== Synopsis ==
=== Hrútur and Hallgerður ===
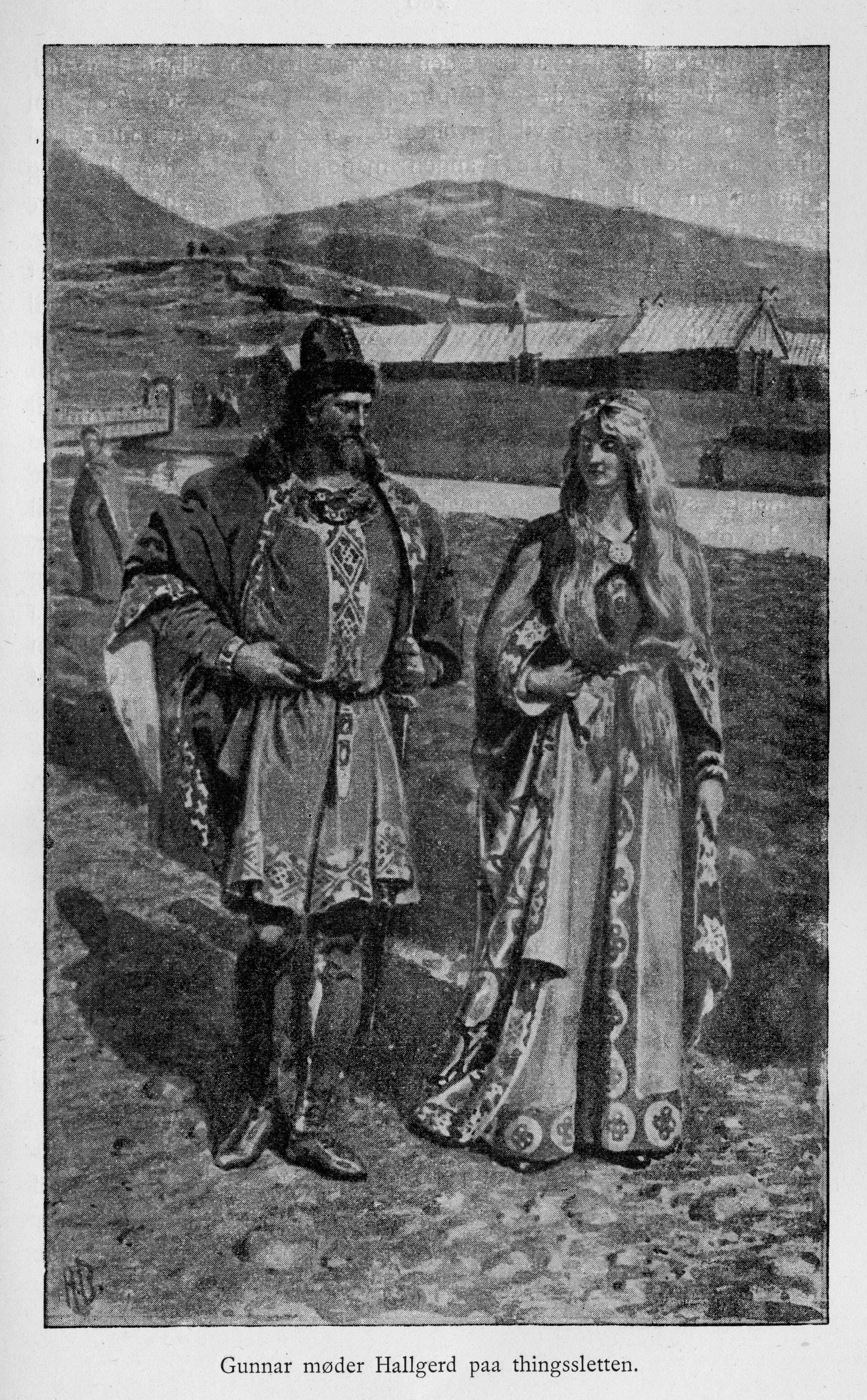
Gunnar and Hallgerðr at the Althing

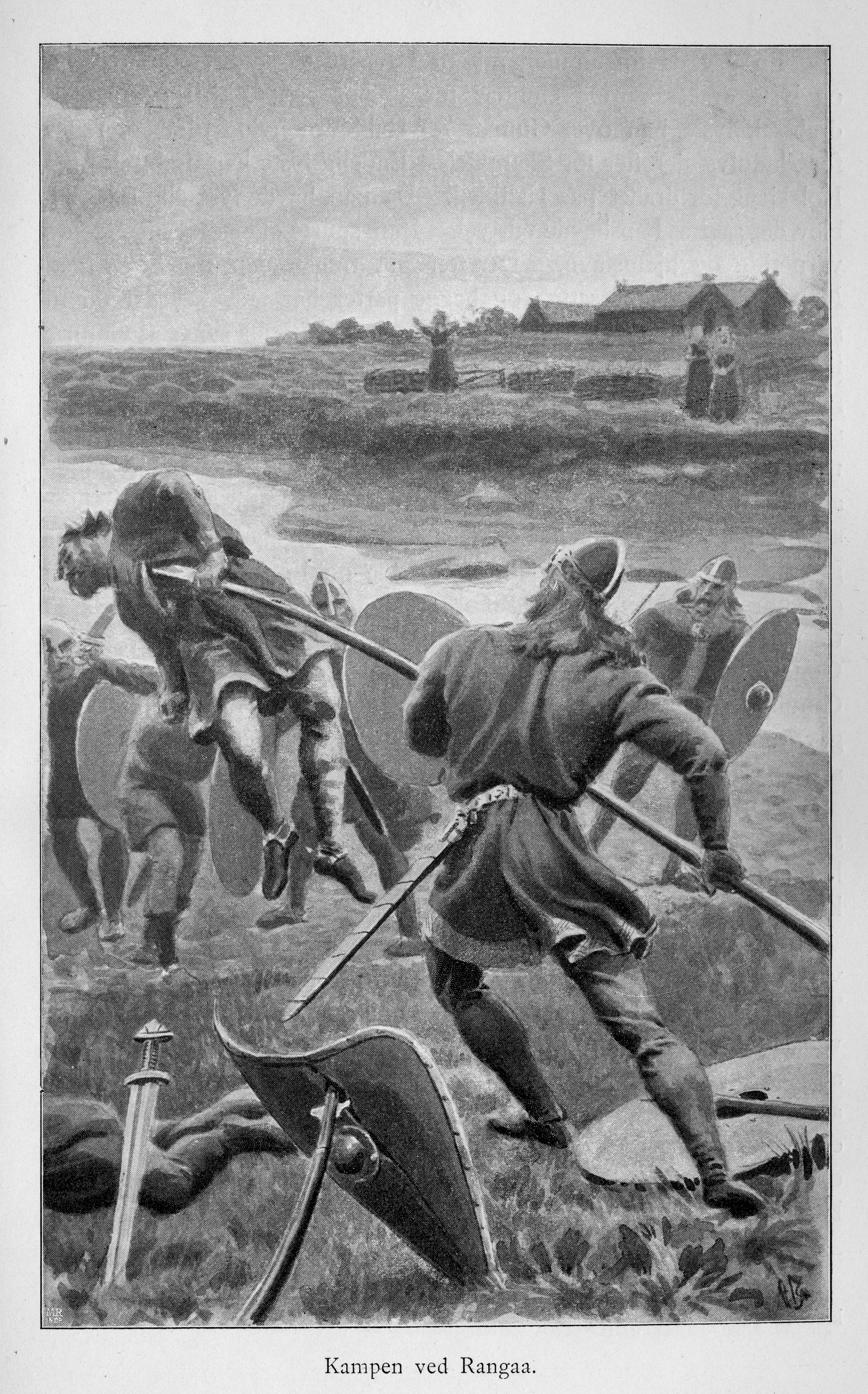
Gunnarr fights the ambushers, killing fourteen men

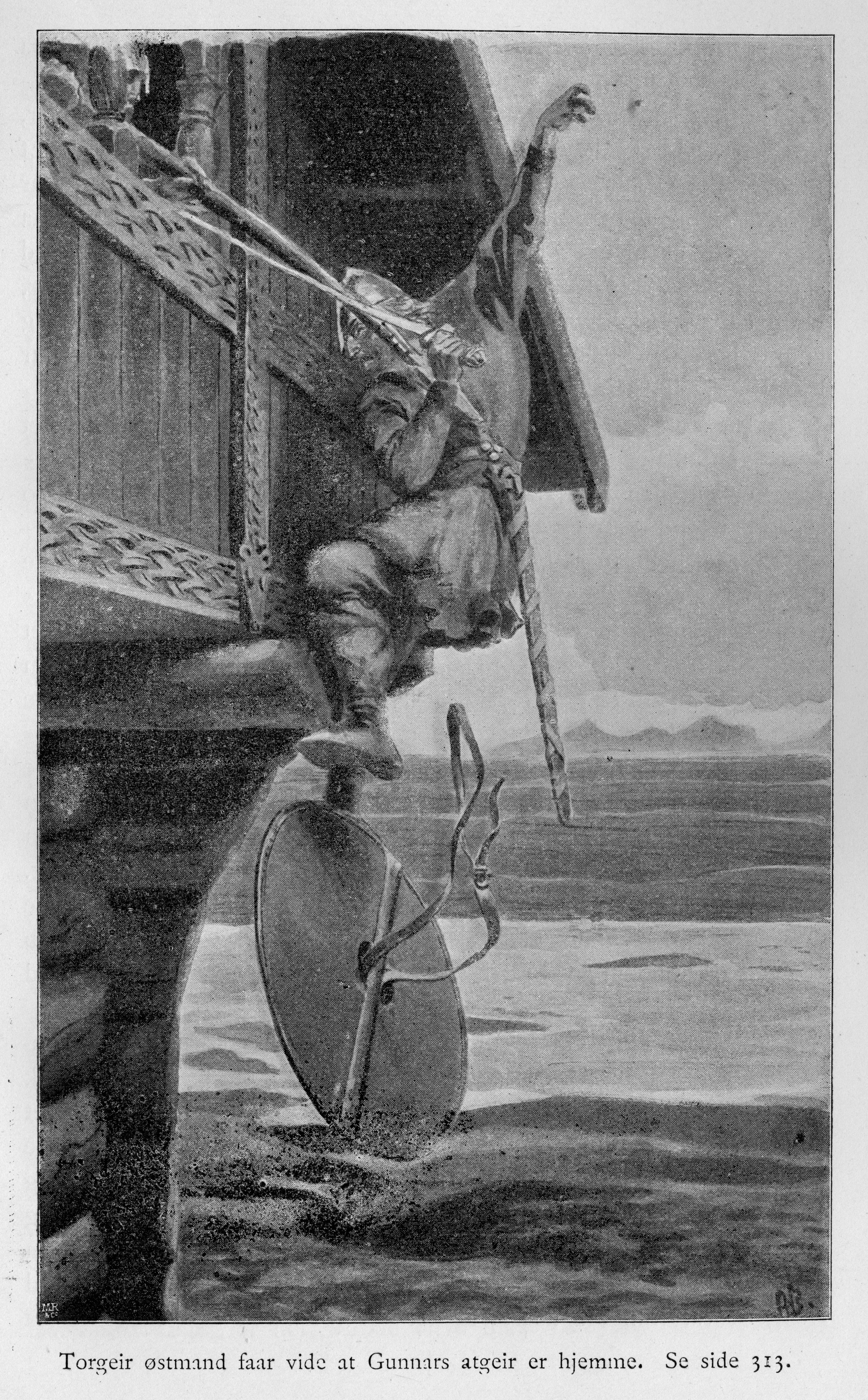
Gunnarr defends his home. He slays two attackers and wounds sixteen. Gunnarr is slain after collapsing from exhaustion.

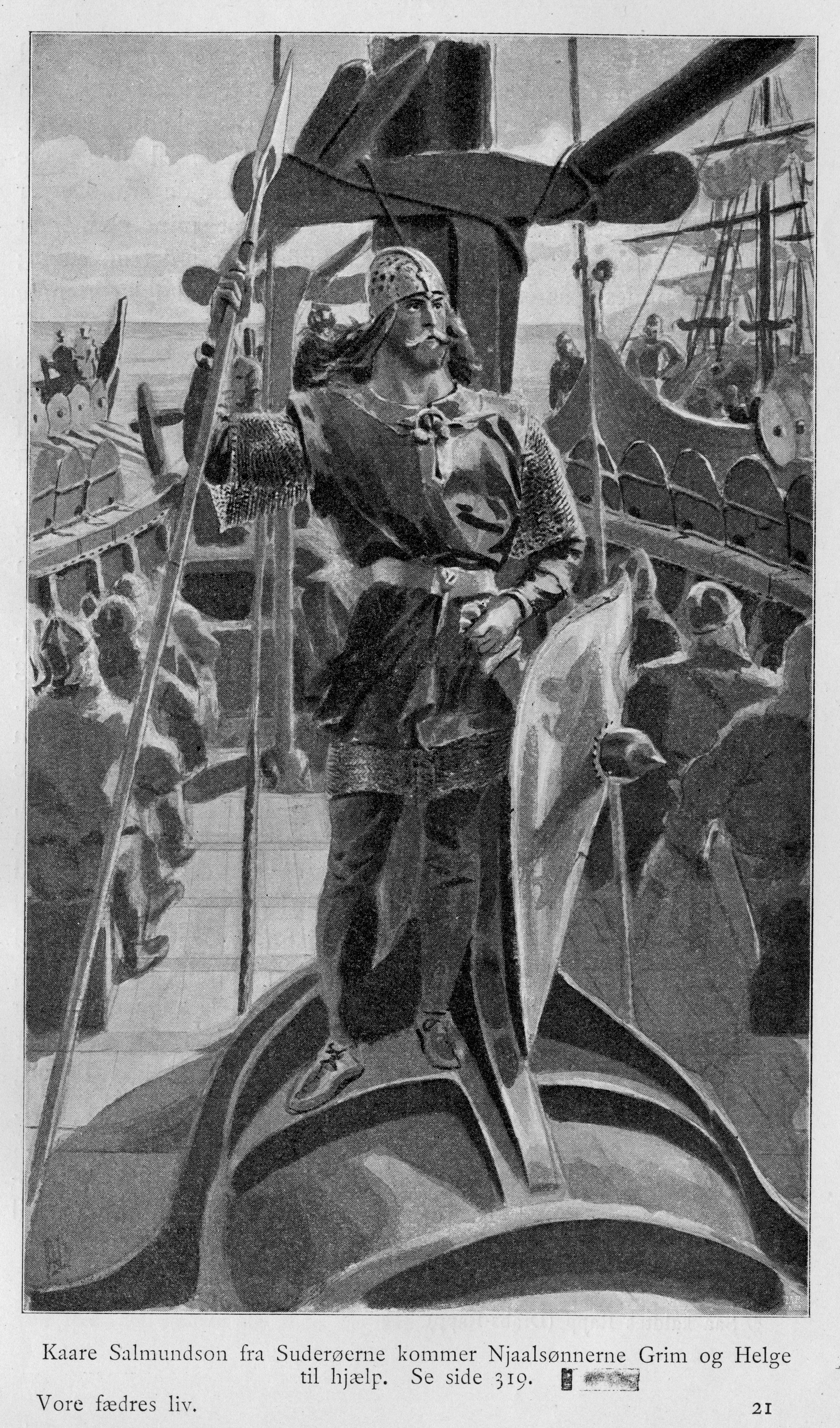
Kári Sölmundarson

The first episode covers the period from the betrothal of Hrútur Herjólfsson and Unnur to the ugly legacy of their divorce. We are shown Hrútur's exploits in Norway where he gains honour at court and in battle, but he ruins his subsequent marriage by becoming the lover of the Norwegian queen mother Gunnhildur. When he denies having a woman in Iceland, she curses him so that he is unable to consummate his marriage. After Unnur divorces him, he retains the dowry by challenging Unnur's father, Mörður, to combat. Mörður refuses, as he knows Hrútur's reputation and that he will lose the fight. Because of this, Hrútur keeps the dowry. While this conforms to Icelandic law, it offends justice.

The first chapter gives one of Hrútur's insights when he makes comments about his beautiful niece, "I do not know how thieves' eyes came into the family". The saga next follows this niece, Hallgerður, through her first two marriages. Both husbands die by the axe of Hallgerður's doting, brutish foster-father, Þjóstólfur. Hallgerður provokes the first death but not the second, although it follows from a disagreement between her and her husband. It is Hrútur who, despite the family ties, avenges the death by killing Þjóstólfur.

=== Gunnar and Njáll ===
Gunnar Hámundarson and Njáll Þorgeirsson are now introduced. Gunnar is a man of outstanding physical prowess, and Njáll has outstanding sagacity; they are close friends. When Gunnar is obliged to revive Unnur's dowry-claim against Hrútur, Njáll gives him the means to do so. By skillful play-acting, Gunnar begins the legal process in Hrútur's own house. He follows Hrútur's doubtful example when it comes to court, and Hrútur, who has previously won by threat of violence, loses to a threat of violence. Despite his humiliation, he sees future links with Gunnar.

This comes about when Gunnar returns with honours from a trip to Scandinavia. He goes to the Althing – the annual assembly – in splendour, and meets Hallgerður. They are impressed with one another and are soon betrothed, despite Hrútur's warnings about Hallgerður's character, and Njáll's misgivings.

Hrútur and Njáll are proven right when Hallgerður clashes with Njáll's wife, Bergþóra. Hallgerður charms a number of dubious characters into killing members of Njáll's household and the spirited Bergþóra arranges vengeance. After each killing, their husbands make financial settlements according to the status of the victims. The fifth victim is Þórður, foster-father of Njáll's sons. Þráinn Sigfússon, Gunnar's uncle and Hallgerður's son-in-law, accompanies the killers. When the feud ends and settlements are made, Þráinn's presence at that killing later causes conflict.

=== Gunnar's feuds ===
Hallgerður now has one of her slaves, Melkólfur, burgle the home of a churlish man named Otkell. Gunnar immediately seeks to make amends, but his handsome offers are not accepted. A lawsuit is started against him which, with Njáll's help, he wins, gaining great honour. However, while remonstrating with Hallgerður about the burglary, Gunnar slaps her.

This is followed by Otkell accidentally wounding Gunnar. Insult follows injury and Gunnar reluctantly goes to avenge himself. With belated help from his brother Kolskeggur, he kills Otkell and his companions.

Under Njáll's influence a new settlement is arranged, and Gunnar's reputation grows. Njáll warns him that this will be the start of his career of killings.

Next, Gunnar accepts a challenge to a horse-fight from a man called Starkaður. In the course of the fight, his opponents cheat, and Gunnar finds himself in a fresh squabble. Njáll tries to mediate but Þorgeir Starkaðsson refuses to accept it. On a journey with his two brothers, Gunnar is ambushed by Starkaður and his allies. In the battle, fourteen attackers and Gunnar's brother Hjörtur are killed.

Worming through all this is Unnur's son, Mörður Valgarðsson. Mörður envies and hates Gunnar, and uses other men to attain his aims. He has learned that Njáll prophesied that Gunnar will die if he kills twice in the same family and subsequently breaks the settlement for his death. He instigates an attack on Gunnar by persons dissatisfied by the settlement. Again, Gunnar wins the fight, but he kills a second man in the same family. The settlement that follows requires that Gunnar and Kolskeggur leave Iceland for three years.

Arrangements are made for exile. But as Gunnar leaves home, he looks homeward and, touched by the beauty of his homestead, resolves not to leave Iceland, thus becoming an outlaw. He goes about as though nothing has changed but his enemies, Mörður among them, seek revenge. He defends himself in his home until his bowstring is cut. Hallgerður refuses to give him strands of her hair to restring his bow; this is in revenge for the slap he once gave her. Gunnar's enemies resist Mörður's proposal to burn him in the house as shameful, but eventually they take the roof off to get to Gunnar. Njáll's son Skarphéðinn assists Högni Gunnarsson in some acts of vengeance before a settlement is achieved.

=== Kári and the sons of Njáll ===
Scandinavian rulers honor two Icelandic expeditions: those of Þráinn Sigfússon and of Njáll's two younger sons. Both return with enhanced honor, but also with companions. Þráinn brings back the malevolent Hrappur, the sons of Njáll and the noble Kári Sölmundarson, who marries their sister. But Njáll's sons also bring back a grievance, blaming Þráinn for the way in which the de facto ruler of Norway, Jarl Hákon, has treated them while looking for Hrappur, who had been hidden by Þráinn. While Njáll says they have been foolish in raising the matter, he advises them to publicise it so that it will be seen as a matter of honor. Þrainn refuses a settlement, and his retainers, including Hallgerður, on her last appearance, insult them.

The most dramatic of the saga's battles follows. Njáll's sons, with Kári, prepare to ambush Þráinn and his followers. There is a bridge of ice over the river between them. Skarphéðinn overtakes his brothers, leaps the river, and slides on the ice past Þráinn, splitting his skull in passing. Between them the attackers kill four men, including Hrappur.

Þráinn's brother, Ketill, has married Njáll's daughter, and between them they bring about a settlement. Wishing to stop further contention, Njáll adopts Þráinn's son Höskuldur as his foster-son. Höskuldur grows up in Njáll's household, and is loved and favoured by him. When he is fully grown, Njáll attempts to find a suitable wife for him, Hildigunnur. However, she refuses, saying that she will only marry Höskuldur if he becomes a chieftain. Njáll manages to get Höskuldur a chieftaincy by instituting the Fifth Court at the Althing, and Höskuldur and Hildigunnur are married.

At this point, the saga recounts the conversion of Iceland to Christianity in 999.

=== Höskuldur and Flosi, the burning ===
Mörður Valgarðsson now finds Höskuldur to be such a successful chief that his own chieftaincy is declining. He sets the sons of Njáll against Höskuldur; the tragedy of the saga is that they are so susceptible to his promptings that they, with Mörður and Kári, murder him as he sows in his field. As one character says, "Höskuldur was killed for less than no reason; all men mourn his death; but none more than Njáll, his foster-father".

Flosi, the uncle of Höskuldur's wife, takes revenge against the killers, and seeks help from powerful chieftains. He is pressured (against his better judgement) by Hildigunnur to accept only blood vengeance. Njáll's sons find themselves at the Althing having to plead for help. Skarphéðinn has become grimly fatalistic, and insults many who might help them.

After some legal sparring, arbitrators are chosen, including Snorri goði, who proposes a wergild of three times the normal compensation for Höskuldur. This is so much that it can only be paid if the arbitrators, and many at the Althing, contribute. The great collection is gathered, and Njáll adds a gift of a fancy cloak. Flosi claims to be insulted by the offer of a unisex garment (an insult from Skarphéðinn also adds fuel to the fire) and the settlement breaks down, with Njáll's silence on the matter remaining unexplained.

Everyone leaves the Althing and prepares, amid portents and prophecies, for the showdown. A hundred men descend on Njáll's home, Bergþórshvoll, to find it defended by about thirty. Any victory for Flosi will be at some cost. But Njáll suggests that his sons defend from within the house, and they, while realizing that this is futile, follow their father into certain death. Flosi and his men set fire to the building.

Both the innocent and the guilty are surrounded. Flosi allows the women to leave but beheads Helgi Njálsson, who attempts to escape disguised as a woman. Although Flosi invites Njáll and Bergþóra to leave, they refuse, preferring to die with their sons and their grandson Þórður (the son of Kári). Eventually eleven people die, not including Kári, who escapes under cover of the smoke by running along the beam of the house. Flosi knows that Kári will exact vengeance for the burning.

=== The Althing ===
At the Althing, both sides gather. Flosi bribes Eyjólfur Bölverksson, one of the finest lawyers in Iceland, into taking over the case, while his opponents blackmail Mörður Valgarðsson into prosecuting, advised by Þórhallur, Njáll's foster-son, who was trained in the law by Njáll, but is kept away from the proceedings by an infected leg. There is a legal joust between the parties. Eventually, when his legal action seems to be failing, Þórhallur lances his boil with his spear and begins fighting. Flosi's men are driven back until Snorri separates the parties. In the confusion, several are killed including Ljótur, Flosi's brother-in-law.

Ljótur's father, Hallur of Síða, takes advantage of the truce to appeal for peace, and seeks no compensation for his son. Moved by this, all but Kári and Njáll's nephew Þorgeir reach a settlement, while everyone contributes to Ljótur's weregild, which in the end amounts to a quadruple compensation. The burners are exiled.

Before the sons of Sigfús reach home, Kári attacks them, and most of the rest of the saga describes his vengeance for the burning. He is supported by Þorgeir and an attractive anti-hero named Björn. He pursues them to Orkney and Wales. The most dramatic moment is when he breaks into the earl's hall in Orkney and kills a man who is giving a slanderous account of those killed at the burning.

After a pilgrimage to Rome, Flosi returns to Iceland. Kári follows, and is shipwrecked near Flosi's home. Testing Flosi's nobility he goes to him for help, and they arrange a final peace. Kári marries Höskuldur's widow. Finally, there is a full reconciliation.

== Popular culture ==
Njáls saga has influenced popular culture in different ways across a variety of media. A number of modern novels draw inspiration from the saga's plot. These include, for example, Friðrik Ásmundsson Brekkan's novels Ulveungernes broder/Saga af Bróður Ylfing (1924/1929) and Drottningarkyn (1947), Dorothy James Roberts' Fire in the Ice (1961), Henry Treece's The Burning of Njal (1964), Tim Severin's Viking-Trilogy (2005), Þórunn Erlu-Valdimarsdóttir's crime novel Kalt er annars blóð (2007), Robert Jansson's Kári's Saga: A Novel of Viking Iceland (2008), Janni Lee Simner's Thief Eyes (2011), and Bjarni Harðarson's Mörður (2014). The Red Romance Book, a collection of heroic tales and legends published in 1905 and lavishly illustrated by Henry Justice Ford, includes three stories based on the saga: The Slaying of Hallgerda's Husbands, The Death of Gunnar, and Njal's Burning. Robert E. Howard's story "The Grey God Passes, or The Twilight of the Grey Gods" (1962) also draws inspiration from the saga. Herman Melville's Moby-Dick (Chapter 16: "The Ship") references the Njals Saga character of "Thorkill-Hake" (Old Norse: Thorkel Haki — "Thorkel the Braggart").

Njáls saga has also inspired a number of poetic works. These include Thomas Gray's The Fatal Sisters (1768), Richard Hole's The Tomb of Gunnar (1789), Jónas Hallgrímsson's Gunnarshólmi (1838), Sigurður Breiðfjörð's Rímur af Gunnari á Hlíðarenda (1860), Grímur Thomsen's Gunnarsríma (1890) and his Íslenzkar konur frá söguöldinni (1895), and Helen von Engelhardt's Gunnar von Hlidarendi (1909).

Dramatic works deriving from the saga's plot and characters include Gordon Bottomley's The Riding to Lithend (1909), Jóhann Sigurjónsson's Logneren/Lyga-Mörður (1917), Thit Jensen's Nial den Vise (1934), and Sigurjón Jónsson's Þiðrandi - sem dísir drápu (1950). Embla Ýr Bárudóttir and Ingólfur Örn Björgvinsson's graphic novel adaptation of the saga, consisting of the four volumes Blóðregn, Brennan, Vetrarvíg, and Hetjan, was published in Iceland between 2003 and 2007.

In film, television, and radio, the Icelandic short film called Brennu-Njálssaga (known by its English title in Europe as The Saga of Burnt Njal) was directed by Friðrik Þór Friðriksson and released 1981. It sarcastically depicted the burning of the book itself, not of the events described within it. The film features on the Icelandic DVD release of Angels of the Universe. Featured in the soundtrack is a song called "Brennu-Njálssaga," composed by the Icelandic new wave band, Þeyr with the collaboration of Hilmar Örn Hilmarsson. This song later appeared in 1981 when the group released its single Iður til Fóta (in the cassette version only). The 1995 adventure film The Viking Sagas is inspired heavily by the saga, through it features an original plot. Episode 27 of Monty Python's Flying Circus is titled "Njorl's Saga". The "saga" in question is quite unrelated to any events in Njáls saga, despite the similarities between the names. In DreamWorks' animated series Dragons: Race to the Edge season 3 episode 3 a small excerpt from Njáls saga is chiseled into a sword and a wall in a cave using the Futhorc runic alphabet. The trope of a man trapped in a building and burned to death drives the Icelandic TV series Trapped (Ófærð). BBC Radio 3 broadcast The Saga of Burnt Njal, an audio adaptation by Hattie Naylor based on a translation by Benjamin Danielsson and directed by Gemma Jenkins, on 24 October 2021, with Justin Salinger as "Njal", Christine Kavanagh as "Bergthora", Justice Ritchie as "Gunnar", Lisa Hammond as "Hattgerd", Jasmine Hyde as "Mord" and Salomé Gunnarsdottir as "The Voice of the Saga".

The saga's influence also appears in other aspects of popular culture. In numerous Shanghai magazines, the Chinese composer Nie Er went by the English name George Njal, after a character in the saga. The Hallgerda Mons, a mountain on Venus, is named for Hallgerðr.

== Manuscripts and editions ==

Njáls saga survives in around 60 manuscripts and fragments, 21 of which – an unusually large number – are from the Middle Ages. None of the vellum manuscripts survives complete, but they tended to be copied conservatively, indicating the reverence which Icelandic scribes have had for the saga and making it relatively easy to reconstruct a complete medieval text. The vellum manuscripts were classified most recently by Einar Ólafur Sveinsson in 1953, en route to his 1954 Íslenzk fornrit edition of the saga, which remains the standard edition. However, a project on 'The Variance of Njáls saga ', based in the Árni Magnússon Institute for Icelandic Studies, is reassessing the complete history of the manuscript transmission of the saga.

The first printed edition of the saga, edited by Ólafur Ólafsson and printed by Johann Rúdolph Thiele, was based primarily on Reykjabók, with reference to Kálfalækjabók and Möðruvallabók. It was published in Copenhagen in 1772 (baekur.is). A major step in the editing of the saga was the 1875–89 critical edition of Konráð Gíslason and Eiríkur Jónsson. The current main edition is that of Einar Ólafur Sveinsson from 1954.

The known, surviving manuscripts of the saga, most of which are available in digital facsimile, are:

Number	Classmark	Name	Date	Medium	Remarks
2, 20	GKS 2870 4to	Gráskinna	c1300	parchment	including younger additions made as repairs, c. 1500×1550, known as Gráskinnuauki.
1a, b	AM 162 b fol. β, δ	Þormóðarbók	c1300	parchment	fragments, thought to originate from the same codex
3, 44	AM 468 4to	Reykjabók	c1300-1325	parchment	folio 7 from C17
5	AM 162 b fol. ζ		c1325	parchment	fragment
4	AM 162 b fol. γ	Óssbók	c1325	parchment	fragment
6	AM 162 b fol. θ		c1325	parchment	fragment
7, 42	AM 132 fol.	Möðruvallabók	c1330-1370	parchment	first 11 leaves and ff. 20 and 30 C17
8	AM 133 fol.	Kálfalækjarbók	c1350	parchment	
9	AM 162 b fol. κ		c1350	parchment	fragment
10	AM 162 b fol. η		c1350	parchment	fragment
11, 19	AM 162 b fol. ε	Hítardalsbók	c1350-1375	parchment	fragment; first folio probably c1500
12, 22	GKS 2868 4to	Skafinskinna	c1350-1400	parchment	f. 31 C17
14	AM 162 b fol. α		c1390-1440	parchment	fragment
13, 15	GKS 2869 4to	Sveinsbók	c1400	parchment	folio 11 written in a later hand
16	AM 162 b fol. ι	Reykjarfjarðarbók	c1400-1425	parchment	fragment
17	AM 466 4to	Oddabók	c1460	parchment	
18	AM 309 4to	Bæjarbók	1498	parchment	
21	AM 921 4to I; Lbs fragm. 2; JS fragm. 4; Þjóðminjasafn I	The Lost Codex	c1600-1650	parchment	four fragments thought to originate in the same codex
23	AM 396 fol.	Melanesbók/Lambavatnsbók	c1600-1650	paper	
31	GKS 1003 fol.		1667-1670	parchment	
24	AM 136 fol.		c1640-1643	paper	
27	AM 555 c 4to	Breiðarbólstaðarbók	c1640-1660	paper	
25	AM 134 fol.	Hofsbók	c1640-1656	paper	
26	AM 470 4to	Hvammsbók	c1640- 1660	paper	
28	AM 137 fol.	Vigfúsarbók	c1640-1672	paper	
29	AM 163 d fol.	Ferjubók	c1650-1682	paper	
30	AM 465 4to		c1650-1699	paper	
32, 43	AM 555 a 4to		1663-1665	paper	folios 1 and 2 in a different hand from the main one
33, 41	AM 163 i fol.	Saurbæjarbók	1668	paper	folios 1-3 in a different hand from the main one
34	Stockholm Papp. 9 fol.		1684	paper	
36	BL Add 4867 fol.		1690	paper	
35	AM 135 fol.		c1690-1697	paper	
37	AM 464 4to		1697	paper	
38	Lbs 222 fol.	Rauðskinna	1698	paper	
40	NKS 1220 fol.	Vigursbók	1698	paper	
39	Lbs 3505 4to		1698	paper	
45	SÁM 33		18th c	paper	1 folio
57	Trinity College Dublin, MS 1002		c. 1750?	paper	
46	AM 469 4to	Fagureyjarbók	1705	paper	
51	NB 313 4to		1711	paper	
48, 49	KB Add 565 4to		c1707-1722	paper	folios 22r-25r in a different hand
50	ÍB 421 4to		c1707-1722	paper	
47	AM 467 4to		c1707-1722	paper	
52, 68	ÍB 261 4to	Lágafellsbók	1740	paper	Folios 1-5 and 134-35 added, probably in the nineteenth century, in two different hands
53	Thott 1776 4to III		c1742-1800	paper	
54	Thott 984 fol. III		c1750	paper	
55	Thott 1765 4to		c1750	paper	
58	Kall 612 4to		1753	paper	
56	ÍB 322 4to		c1750-1770	paper	
59	NKS 1788 4to	Bjarnarstaðarbók	1760	paper	
61	Handrit í eigu Landakotskirkju	Landakotsbók	c1760-1780	paper	
60	NKS 1219 fol.		c1760-1780	paper	
62	SÁM 137 (handrit úr safni Jóns Samsonarsonar)	The Younger Flateyjarbók	1767-1769	paper	
63	AM Acc. 50		1770	paper	
65, 70	Lbs 1415 4to		c1770	paper	Folios 225–26 added in the nineteenth century
64	ÍB 270 4to	Urðabók	c1770	paper	
66	NB 372 4to		1772	paper	
67	Lbs 437 4to		1773	paper	
69	Lbs 747 fol.		1871-1875	paper	
70	SÁM 168	Seattle Fragment	c.1800-1900	paper	3-folio fragment
translation	GKS 1021 fol.		1660-64	paper	Danish translation in the hand of Þormóður Torfason.
summary	AM 576 a 4to		1660-95	paper	Two-folio summary by Einar Eyjólfsson.
summary	Biörner’s Swedish summary		c. 1720-30	paper	Swedish summary (with some Icelandic text) written for the Swedish Antikvitetskollegiet.
summary	Rostock Mss. philol. 78/2		c. 1730?	paper	5-folio German summary
translation	Stockholm papp. 93/96 fol.		1733-63	paper	Swedish translation by Þorvaldur Brockmann
translation	Stockholm papp. 93 fol.		1733-63	paper	Carl Hagelberg's clean copy/revision of Þorvaldur Brockmann's Swedish translation.
translation	Lbs 4855 8vo		1772-1900	paper	A copy of the 1772 edition with partial manuscript translation into German

== Translations ==
Njáls saga has been translated into English four times:

- Dasent, Sir George Webbe (1861). The Story of Burnt Njal. Edinburgh: Edmonston and Douglas.
  - Repr. 1900, London: Grant Richards.
  - Repr. 1911: London, New York: Dent, Dutton.
- Bayerschmidt, Carl F.; Hollander, Lee M. (1955). Njál's Saga. New York: New York University Press for the American-Scandinavian Foundation.
  - Repr. 1956, London: George Allen and Unwin.
  - Repr. 1979, Westport, Conn.: Greenwood Press. ISBN 9780313208140
  - Repr. 1998, Ware, Herts.: Wordsworth Editions. ISBN 1853267856
- Magnusson, Magnus; Pálsson, Hermann (1960). Njal's Saga. Harmondsworth: Penguin. ISBN 0140441034.
- Translation by Robert Cook, in Hreinsson, Viðar (1997). The Complete Sagas of the Icelanders, Including 49 Tales. Volume 3. Reykjavík: Leifur Eiríksson. ISBN 9979929332.
  - Revised reprint as Njal's Saga, 2001, London: Penguin. ISBN 0140447695

== See also ==
- Njálurefill

== Sources ==
- Ármann Jakobsson. 2007. "Masculinity and Politics in Njáls saga", Viator 38, pp. 191–215.
- Einar Ól. Sveinsson. 2010 [1954]. Brennu-Njáls saga. Hið íslenzka fornritafélag. ISBN 9979-893-12-5.
- Halldór Laxness. 1997 [1945]. "Eftirmáli", Brennunjáls saga. Vaka-Helgafell. ISBN 9979-2-1242-X.
- Magnusson, Magnus. 1987 [1960]. "Introduction", Njal's Saga. Penguin Classics. ISBN 0-14-044103-4.
- Gylfason, Thorsteinn. 1998. "Introduction", Njál's Saga. Wordsworth Classics. ISBN 1-85326-785-6.
- Vésteinn Ólason. 1998. Dialogues with the Viking Age: Narration and Representation in the Sagas of the Icelanders. Heimskringla. ISBN 9979-3-1650-0.
- Vésteinn Ólason. 2006. "Íslendingasögur og þættir", Íslensk bókmenntasaga I. ISBN 9979-3-2721-9.
