= Bergþórshvoll =

Archaeological site in Iceland

Coordinates: 63.636°N 20.330°W

Bergþórshvoll (Modern Icelandic: [ˈpɛrkˌθour̥sˌkʰvɔtl̥]; Old Norse: [ˈberɡˌθoːrsˌxwolː]; usually anglicized as Bergthorsknoll) is an area in Vestur-Landeyjar in Rangárvallasýsla, Iceland.

Bergþórshvoll is an important setting in the Icelandic saga Njál's saga, the home and scene of the final burning of Njáll Þorgeirsson and his entire family.

Antiquarian Sigurður Vigfússon (1828–1892) conducted an archaeological dig on the site at the end of the 19th century. Matthías Þórðarson (1877–1961) made an extensive excavation at Bergþórshvoll during 1927, 1928 and 1931.
