= Olaf the Peacock =

10th century Icelandic chieftain

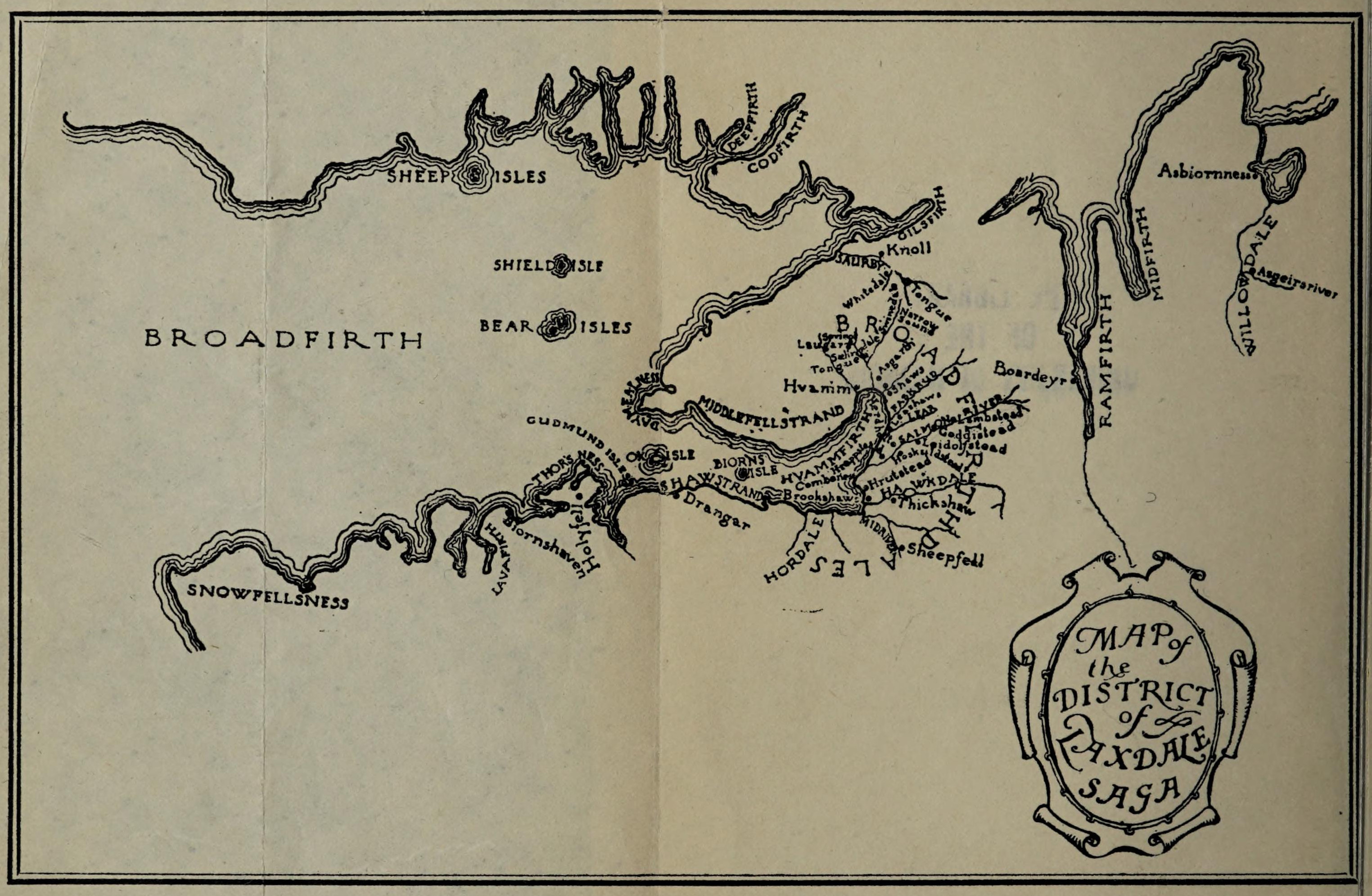
Map of the district of the Laxdæla saga, from an English-language translation

Olaf the Peacock or Olaf Hoskuldsson (Old Norse: Óláfr "pái" Hǫskuldsson [ˈoːˌlɑːvz̠ ˈpʰɑːe ˈhɔˌskuldsˌson]; Modern Icelandic: Ólafur "pái" Höskuldsson [ˈouːˌlaːvʏr ˈpʰauːɪ ˈhœˌskʏl(t)sˌsɔːn]; c. 938–1006) was a merchant and chieftain of the early Icelandic Commonwealth, who was nicknamed "the Peacock" because of his proud bearing and magnificent wardrobe. He is a major character in the Laxdæla saga and is mentioned in a number of other Icelandic sources. The son of a slave woman and an Icelandic chieftain, Olaf became one of the wealthiest landowners in Iceland and played a major role in its politics and society during the latter half of the tenth century. In addition to the Laxdæla Saga in which he takes a leading role, Olaf also is mentioned in Egils saga, Njáls saga, Gunnlaugs saga, Kormáks saga, Grettirs saga and the Landnámabók, among others.

== Birth and upbringing ==
Olaf was the son of Hoskuld Dala-Kollsson, a chieftain who lived in the Laxardal region. According to Laxdæla Saga, Hoskuld purchased a mute thrall-woman named Melkorka from a Rus' merchant on Brännö while on a trading expedition to Norway, and made her his concubine while away from his wife Jorunn Bjarnadottir. When Hoskuld returned home to Iceland, he took the concubine with him. Despite Jorunn's irritation, the concubine was accepted into Hoskuld's household, though he remained faithful to Jorunn while in Iceland. The following winter the concubine gave birth to a son, to whom they gave the name Olaf after Hoskuld's uncle, Olaf Feilan, who had recently died. Landnámabók mentions that Hoskuld and Melkorka had another son, Helgi, but he does not appear in Laxdæla. According to Laxdæla saga, Olaf was a precocious child, and could speak and walk perfectly by the age of two. One day Hoskuld discovered Olaf's mother speaking to her son; she was not, in fact, mute. When he confronted her she told him that she was an Irish princess named Melkorka carried off in a Viking raid, and that her father was an Irish king named "Myrkjartan" (Muirchertach mac Néill). Shortly thereafter squabbling between Jorunn and Melkorka forced Hoskuld to move his concubine and his son by her to a different farm, which thereafter was known as Melkorkustaðir.

At the age of seven, over his mother's objections, Olaf became the foster son and heir of a wealthy but childless goði named Thord, who was at the time engaged in complex litigation with the kinsmen of his ex-wife Vigdis Ingjaldsdottir (another descendant of Thorstein the Red). Olaf's adoption complicated the issues in the suit and threatened to lead to a blood feud, but Hoskuld arranged a settlement and compensated Vigdis' kinsmen with gifts. By fostering Olaf, Thord gained the protection of the powerful Hoskuld, and Hoskuld secured an inheritance for his illegitimate son beyond the limited amount he was permitted to leave to Olaf under Icelandic law. Olaf accompanied Thord to the Althing when he was twelve years old, and his fancy clothing earned him the admiring nickname "the Peacock."

== Career abroad ==
Around 956, Olaf, at Melkorka's urging, decided to go abroad to seek his fortune. Hoskuld was opposed and would not provide trade wares, and the property of Olaf's foster-father Thord was mostly in immobile goods and land. In part to arrange financing for his expedition, his mother Melkorka married Thorbjorn the Feeble, a farmer who had previously assisted her in the management of Melkorkustead. Melkorka and Thorbjorn had a son named Lambi. Olaf sailed to Norway with Orn, a sea-captain and hirdman of King Harald Greycloak. He gained great honor at Harald's court, and was a favorite of the king's mother Gunnhild, who had, according to Icelandic sources, been the lover of Olaf's uncle Hrut Herjolfsson. When Olaf expressed a desire to find his mother's people in Ireland, Gunnhild financed his voyage.

Olaf set sail for Ireland with Orn to find his mother's people, taking with him tokens and gifts from Melkorka to her father and her nursemaid. During the voyage, their ship became lost in a fog. When the fog lifted, an argument arose between Orn and most of the rest of Olaf's men about the proper course to reach Ireland. When asked if the decision should be put to a vote of the majority, Olaf is supposed to have said, "I want only the shrewdest to decide; in my opinion the counsel of fools is all the more dangerous the more of them there are." With those words, the matter was accepted as settled, and Orn took charge of the navigation.

Upon arriving in Ireland they were stranded far outside the protection of the Norse–Gaelic longphorts. The ship was attacked by local Irishmen, despite the efforts of Olaf, who spoke the Gaelic, to negotiate safe passage with them.

As luck would have it, the local king arrived on the scene, and proved to be Olaf's alleged grandfather Myrkjartan. Olaf remained with Myrkjartan for a time, and the king, according to Laxdaela Saga, even offered to make Olaf his heir. Olaf, however, ultimately returned to Norway, afraid of provoking Myrkjartan's sons. Olaf returned to the court of King Harald, where he was greatly honored by both the king and his mother Gunnhild.

== Return to Iceland ==
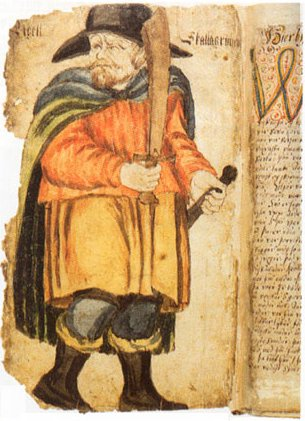
Olaf's father in law Egill Skallagrímsson, from a 17th-century manuscript of Egils Saga

Olaf returned home around 957 with great wealth. Upon his return, his father Hoskuld arranged a marriage for him with Thorgerd Egilsdottir, the daughter of Egill Skallagrímsson. Thorgerd was initially reluctant to marry the son of a slave, refusing to believe that Olaf's mother was a princess. However, she ultimately agreed to the match after an hours-long private conversation with Olaf. At the wedding Olaf gave Egill an ornate sword from Ireland. Olaf and Thorgerd lived happily together at Hoskuldstead for some time. Around 962 Olaf's foster father Thord died, leaving Olaf his property and goðorð. Olaf bought land and built a new homestead at Hjardarholt, which, according to the saga, he had to cleanse of the draugr of its former owner, Killer-Hrapp. As time went on people began to settle near Olaf's hall and regarded him as their goði. Olaf's ever-increasing wealth caused jealousy from Hoskuld's wife Jorunn. Around the same time Olaf and Thorgerd had a daughter, Thurid. Hjardarholt was renowned for its rich decorations; some two decades later, the skald Úlfr Uggason composed the famous poem Húsdrápa, about certain mythological scenes illustrated on the walls of Olaf's hall.

Olaf's half-sister Hallgerd Hoskuldsdottir married Gunnar Hámundarson, a chieftain who lived at Hlíðarendi in southern Iceland, during this period. Olaf and Gunnar became close friends.

Hoskuld died around 965, leaving Olaf a full mark of gold, causing tension between Olaf and Hoskuld's legitimate sons, Bard and Thorleik. As an illegitimate son, Olaf was entitled to one mark of his father's wealth; this was, however, customarily understood to be a mark of silver and not gold. Olaf eased the tension by paying one-third of the communal funeral feast for Hoskuld.

Olaf and Thorgerd had a number of children after Thurid, the sons Kjartan (named after King Myrkjartan), Steinthor, Halldor, Helgi, and Hoskuld and the daughters Thorbjorg, Thorgerd and Berghora. The ill-fated Kjartan would be his father's favorite. Thorbjorg, nicknamed digra ('the fat') appears in Grettis saga, where she rescues Grettir from capture by farmers.

== Second expedition to Norway and aftermath ==
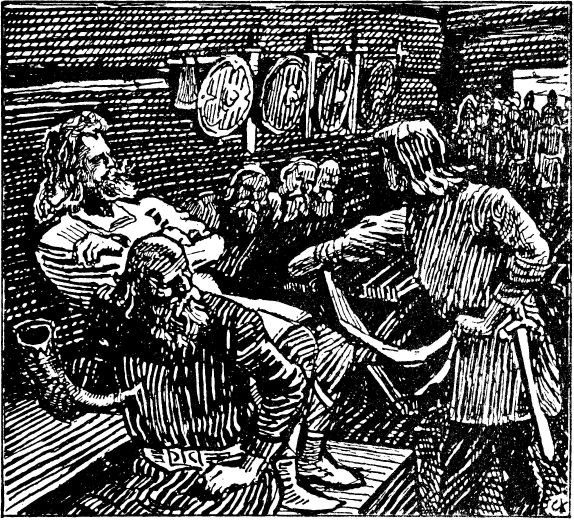
Jarl Haakon Sigurdsson. Illustration by Christian Krohg.

Around 975, over his wife's objections, Olaf went on a second expedition to Norway. There he stayed with a Viking named Geirmund the Noisy and visited Haakon Jarl, the latter of whom gave him a cargo of timber to take home as a gift. On his return Olaf reluctantly brought Geirmund with him. and Geirmund fell in love with Olaf's daughter Thurid. Though Olaf was opposed to the match, Geirmund bribed Thorgerd to be his advocate, and Olaf relented. The marriage was an unhappy one, and after three years Geirmund decided to return home without leaving any money for the support of his ex-wife and daughter. Enraged, Thurid boarded his ship before he departed, stole his famous sword "Leg-Biter," and left their infant daughter Groa on the ship. Geirmund cursed the sword, and on his return to Norway he and all of his shipmates, including little Groa, were drowned.

== Later years ==
During the closing years of the tenth century, Olaf's kinsman and friend Gunnar became embroiled in a blood feud with several neighboring landowners. A settlement was reached whereby Gunnar would accept "lesser outlawry," a three-year exile, but after agreeing to the settlement Gunnar refused to leave Iceland. Olaf tried to protect his kinsman but was unsuccessful, and Gunnar was killed by his enemies. Olaf's favorite son Kjartan traveled abroad with his beloved cousin Bolli Þorleiksson. The two were very close. Ultimately, however, they grew apart when Bolli married Kjartan's lover Guðrún Ósvífrsdóttir. According to Oddr Snorrason, Olaf had predicted that strife would ensue between Kjartan and Bolli. Tensions between the cousins grew until a full-blown blood feud ended with Kjartan being killed by Bolli in 1003. Ironically, Bolli killed Kjartan with the sword "Leg-biter," which had been given to him as a gift by his cousin Thurid, Kjartan's sister. Olaf refused to prosecute Bolli for the killing, and arranged for him to pay a fine instead; by sharp contrast, he had Gudrun's brothers, who had goaded Bolli to fight his cousin, driven into exile. Jesse Byock contrasted Olaf's magnanimity towards Bolli with the blood feud mentality of his wife Thorgerd:

Olaf knows that Kjartan, who was involved in a love triangle with Bolli and Bolli's wife Gudrun Osvifrsdottir, caused his own downfall by acting aggressively. In Icelandic terms, Kjartan had surpassed the acceptable limits of immoderation. Whereas Olaf wants to maintain the solidarity of the larger family, keeping workable relations with his siblings and their children, Thorgerd's concerns are different. She focuses more narrowly on the honour of her nuclear family.

Olaf died in 1006, and Olaf's widow Thorgerd subsequently directed a number of revenge-killings herself, including that of Thorkel, a man who had witnessed Kjartan's death but been indifferent to it and had not intervened. Bolli was killed by Olaf's sons and their allies in a raid led by Thorgerd. Some twelve years later, Gudrun, with the help of her friend Snorri Goði, had a number of Bolli's murderers killed in revenge.
