= The Lion Has Many Ears =

Icelandic crime novel

Mörg eru ljónsins eyru (literally, 'Many are the Lion's Ears', or, in the publisher's translation, 'The Lion Has Many Ears'), published in Reykjavík in 2010 by JPV, is an Icelandic crime novel by Þórunn Erlu-Valdimarsdóttir set between 1995 and 2009.

It is to a large extent an adaptation of the famous medieval Icelandic saga Laxdæla saga; in the assessment of Páll Baldvin Baldvinsson, 'the love triangle of Laxdæla saga is here dragged screaming into the present, though some parts of the story were clearly written before the Crash, others after'.

The novel was nominated for the fiction category of the Icelandic Literary Prize in 2010, and for the 2011 Blóðdropinn prize for Icelandic crime fiction — though in the view of Bjarni Ólafsson, 'as a crime-novel, the novel doesn't manage to get off the ground', whereas 'as a dramatic tragedy, on the other hand, the book is a considerable achievement'.

== Summary ==
The novel is to a large extent an adaptation of the famous medieval Icelandic saga Laxdæla saga.

The main characters are:

Character	Identity	Counterpart in Laxdæla saga
Leó L. Jónsson	A police investigator, often referred to in the book as ljónið ('the lion').	Þorkell Eyjólfsson
Guðrún Lovísa Óðinsdóttir	A glamorous TV news presenter.	Guðrún Ósvífursdóttir
Sveinn (Svenni)	Guðrún's son by her first husband, Þorvaldur.	none
Bolli	An artist from a wealthy family. His father, Þorlákur, is the son of Höskuldur by Höskuldur's wife Jórunn. His mother is Sigurlaug.	Bolli Þorleiksson
Kjartan	A historian, son of Ólafur Páll, son of Höskuldur by Markefka, daughter of Kelijan, a descendant of Stanislaw August Poniatowski, the last king of Poland. Kjartan's mother is Þorgerður.	Kjartan Ólafsson
Hrefna	Kjartan's wife.	Hrefna Ásgeirsdóttir

The book begins with Léo investigating the scene of Kjartan's violent death at his home in Reykjavík around New Year's Day 2009. However, it then proceeds more or less linearly to recount the life and relationships of Guðrún from 1995 to that point. Guðrún has recently divorced her first husband, Þorvaldur, after he hit her; she is beginning a promising relationship with Þórður, when he drowns in a boating accident after mysterious threats from some British tenants of his mother. Leó gets to know Guðrún while investigating this incident; Guðrún explains that a tarot reader once prophesied that she would divorce her first husband; showed a mann drowning on the second card; a happy couple with a looming figure behind them on the third; a woman with her palms over her face on the fourth; and happiness on the fifth. This corresponds to Guðrún Ósvífursdóttir's celebrated prophetic dream in Laxdæla saga.

In 1998 Guðrún meets the cousins Kjartan and Bolli and after having sex with both at once enters a long-term relationship with the former. Over time, she finds out about the cousins' complex relationship, as sons of half-brothers. It turns out that the cousins' grandfather Höskuldur freed Kjartan's grandmother Markefka (by purchase) from human traffickers in Oslo, where she fled during the Second World War. Höskuldur brought her to Iceland, to the great displeasure of Bolli's grandmother Jórunn. This corresponds to Höskuldur Dala-Kollsson's relationship with Melkorka in Laxdæla saga. Kjartan has a chip on his shoulder about Bolli's inherited wealth and is somewhat obsessed with his Polish aristocratic ancestry.

Suddenly, in 2005, Kjartan moves to Uppsala in Sweden to do a PhD; he expects Guðrún to accompany him, but she refuses, so he leaves her behind and breaks off communication. (While there, he also has a relationship with his supervisor, professor Bergström.) In his absence, Guðrún has a one-night stand with Leó, which leads to the break-up of Leó's unhappy marriage. Guðrún then marries Bolli. She has a son, Þorlákur, represented at this point in the story as Bolli's.

On Kjartan's return in 2007, he is enraged that Bolli and Guðrún have married; meanwhile, Guðrún realises that although she loves Bolli, she is unhappy not being with Kjartan. Bolli offers Kjartan a fine horse as a present, but Kjartan refuses it. Kjartan marries a young woman from a prominent family called Hrefna. At a party in 2008, Guðrún is annoyed that Hrefna gets the best seat; after the party, a valuable shawl and pistol which Kjartan has inherited from his Polish ancestors go missing. Leó's investigation turns nothing up.

Later that year, Guðrún, Bolli and Þorlákur go away to their summerhouse, but are tricked into drinking a sleeping-draught and find themselves locked into the house, where they are trapped for several days. Though no charges are pressed, it soon becomes clear that Kjartan was the culprit, taking revenge for what he imagines is Guðrún and Bolli's theft of his shawl and pistol.

At this point, the 2008–2011 Icelandic financial crisis commences. Bolli's wealth insulates him from significant harm, but Kjartan and Hrefna, on Bolli's advice, have taken loans and invested their and Kjartan's parents' wealth in a company that has collapsed. Kjartan has also attempted to stymie a land purchase by Bolli, further overstretching himself. Kjartan's whole family is now bankrupt and his marriage collapses. Kjartan descends into rage and alcoholism and is found dead, presumed murdered, around New Year's Day 2009. Not long after, Bolli is found shot.

The novel then focuses on Leó's investigation of the murder, which is solved largely because it turns out that Guðrún had a stalker, Oddur, who witnessed and obsessively recorded the deaths of both Kjartan and Bolli. It emerges that Hrefna hid Kjartan's shawl out of jealousy; that Guðrún's son Svenni stole the antique pistol; that Kjartan in fact killed himself, staging his suicide as a murder (echoing how in Laxdæla saga Kjartan refuses to defend himself against Bolli); and that Hrefna murdered Bolli, apparently supposing that he was to blame for Kjartan's murder.

In an epilogue, Guðrún bumps into Leó in the street and it becomes clear from family resemblance that her son Þorlákur is in fact not Bolli's son, but Leó's, and the two become a happy couple, echoing Guðrún Ósvifursdóttir's fourth marriage, to Þorkell Eyjólfsson, in Laxdæla saga.

== Reviews ==
- Sigmundsdóttir, Ásdís (Winter 2010). "Flutningur Laxdælu til nútímans [Transfer of Laxdæla to the present]". Spássían (in Icelandic). p. 12.
- Ólafsson, Bjarni (17 October 2010). "Betri tragedía en glæpasaga [A better tragedy than a crime novel]". Lesbók SunnudagsMogginn (in Icelandic). p. 54.
- Benónýsdóttir, Friðrika (20 October 2010). "Heldur þann næstbesta [Rather the second-best]". Fréttablaðið (in Icelandic). p. 31.
- Baldvinsson, Páll Baldvin (29–31 October 2010). "Stílgáfa, næmni og skáldleg tilþrif [Stylishness, sensitivity, and literary accomplishment]". Fréttatíminn (in Icelandic). p. 44.
