= Olaf Feilan =

Icelandic gothi (c. 890–940)

Olaf Feilan Thorsteinsson (Old Norse: Óláfr "feilan" Þorsteinsson [ˈoːˌlɑːvz̠ ˈfɛilɑn ˈθorˌstɛinsˌson], Modern Icelandic: Ólafur "feilan" Þorsteinsson [ˈouːˌlaːvʏr ˈfeiːlan ˈθɔrˌsteinsˌsɔːn]; c. 890–940) was an Icelandic gothi of the Settlement period. He was the son of Thorstein the Red, jarl of Caithness, and his wife Thurid Eyvindsdottir. The byname "feilan" is derived from the Old Irish fáelán, meaning wolfling or little wolf.

After the death of his father Olaf was reared by his grandmother Aud the Deep-minded, and emigrated with her to Iceland, where they settled at the estate called Hvamm in the Laxardal region. Olaf married a woman named Alfdis of Barra, around 920. According to the Laxdæla saga Aud (called "Unn" in the saga) held Olaf dearer than anyone else, and bequested the Hvamm estate to him after her death. She arranged Olaf's betrothal to Alfdis, and planned the wedding feast for the end of summer (or autumn), which she predicted "would be the last feast I would hold". She indeed died during the festivities that lasted 3-days, but the feast was continued to commemorate both Olaf's marriage and Aud's death. The Landnámabók gives briefer notice on this, merely stating she died during the funeral feast she held for herself in anticipation of her own death.

The children of Olaf and Alfdis were Thord Gellir, Thora, Helga, Thorunn, and Thordis. Olaf died around 940. Shortly after his death, his nephew Hoskuld Dala-Kollsson named his illegitimate son Olaf the Peacock as namesake (Olaf the Peacock had a son Kjartan Óláfsson, who was the beloved of Guðrún Ósvífrsdóttir, heroine of Laxdæla saga).

== Descendants ==
Lines from Thord Gellir

- — Eyjolf the Gray Thordarson — Thorkel Eyjolfsson (4th husband of Gudrun Osvifsdottir late in Laxdæla saga)
- — Eyjolf the Gray Thordarson — Gellir — Thorgils — Ari the Learned.
- — Thorkel Kuggi Thordarson — Thorstein Kuggason (also late in Laxdæla saga)
- — Thorhild Rjupa (the Ptarmigan), wife of Snorri — Thord Horsehead — Thorfinn Karlsefni the explorer to Vinland
