= Snæfellsnes =

Peninsula in western Iceland

Coordinates: 64°51′29″N 23°06′54″W

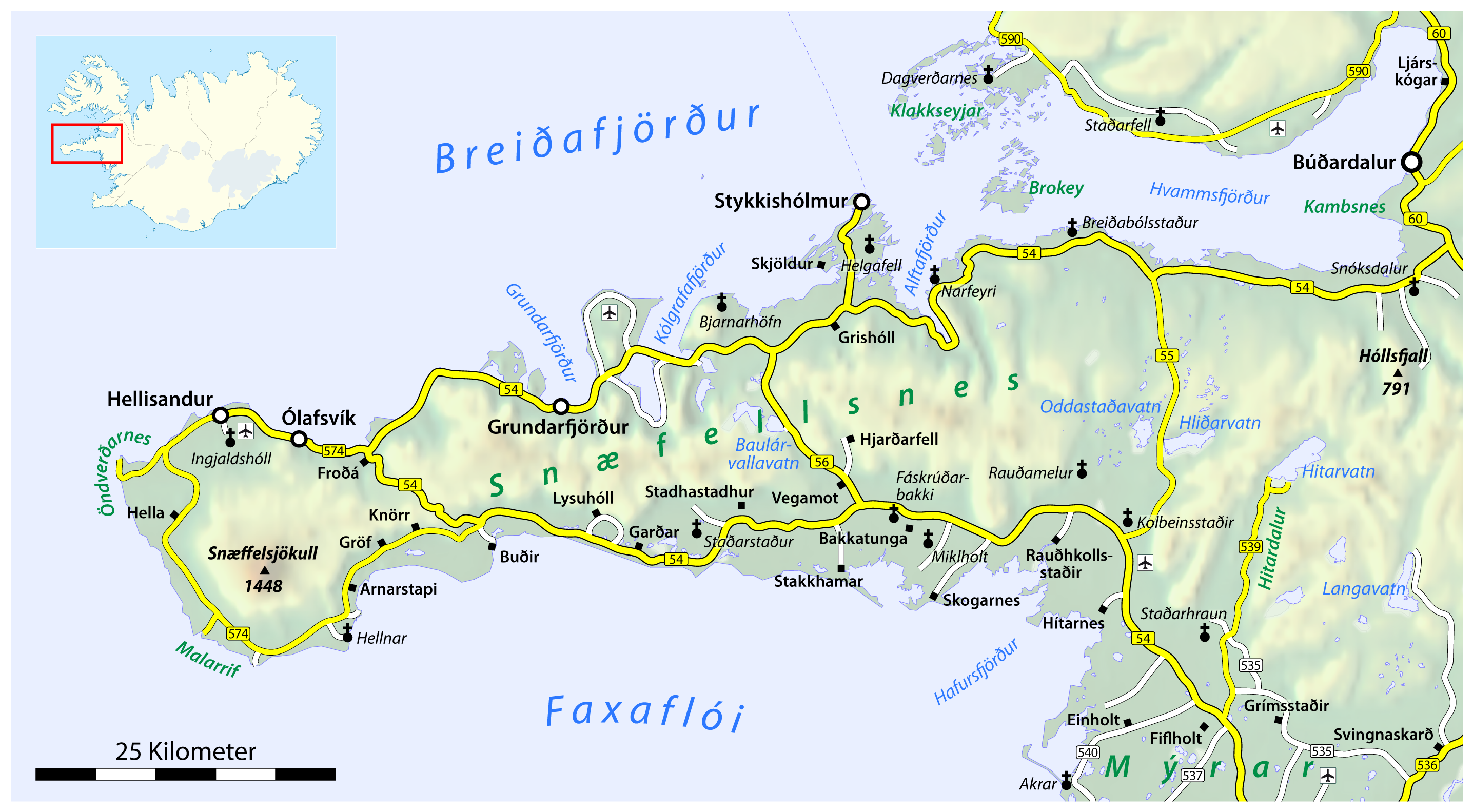
Location of Snæfellsnes in Iceland

The Snæfellsnes (Icelandic pronunciation: [ˈs(t)naiːˌfɛlsˌnɛːs]) is a peninsula situated to the west of Borgarfjörður, in western Iceland.

The peninsula has a volcanic origin having the Snæfellsnes volcanic belt down its centre, and the Snæfellsjökull volcano, regarded as one of the symbols of Iceland, at its western tip. With its height of 1,446 m (4,744 ft), it is the highest mountain on the peninsula and has a glacier at its peak (jökull means "glacier" in Icelandic). The volcano can be seen on clear days from Reykjavík, a distance of about 120 km (75 mi). The mountain is also known as the setting of the novel Journey to the Center of the Earth by the French author Jules Verne. The area surrounding Snæfellsjökull has been designated one of the four national parks by the government of Iceland. It is also the home of the Ingjaldsholl church, a Protestant church.

The peninsula is one of the main settings in the Laxdœla saga and it was, according to this saga, the birthplace of the first West Norse member of the Varangian Guard, Bolli Bollasson. Other historical people who lived in the area according to the saga include Guðrún Ósvífursdóttir, Bolli Þorleiksson and Snorri Goði.

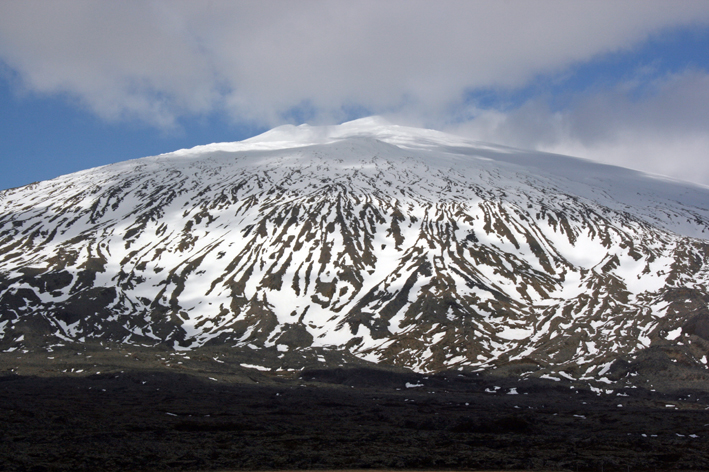
Snæfellsjökull volcano

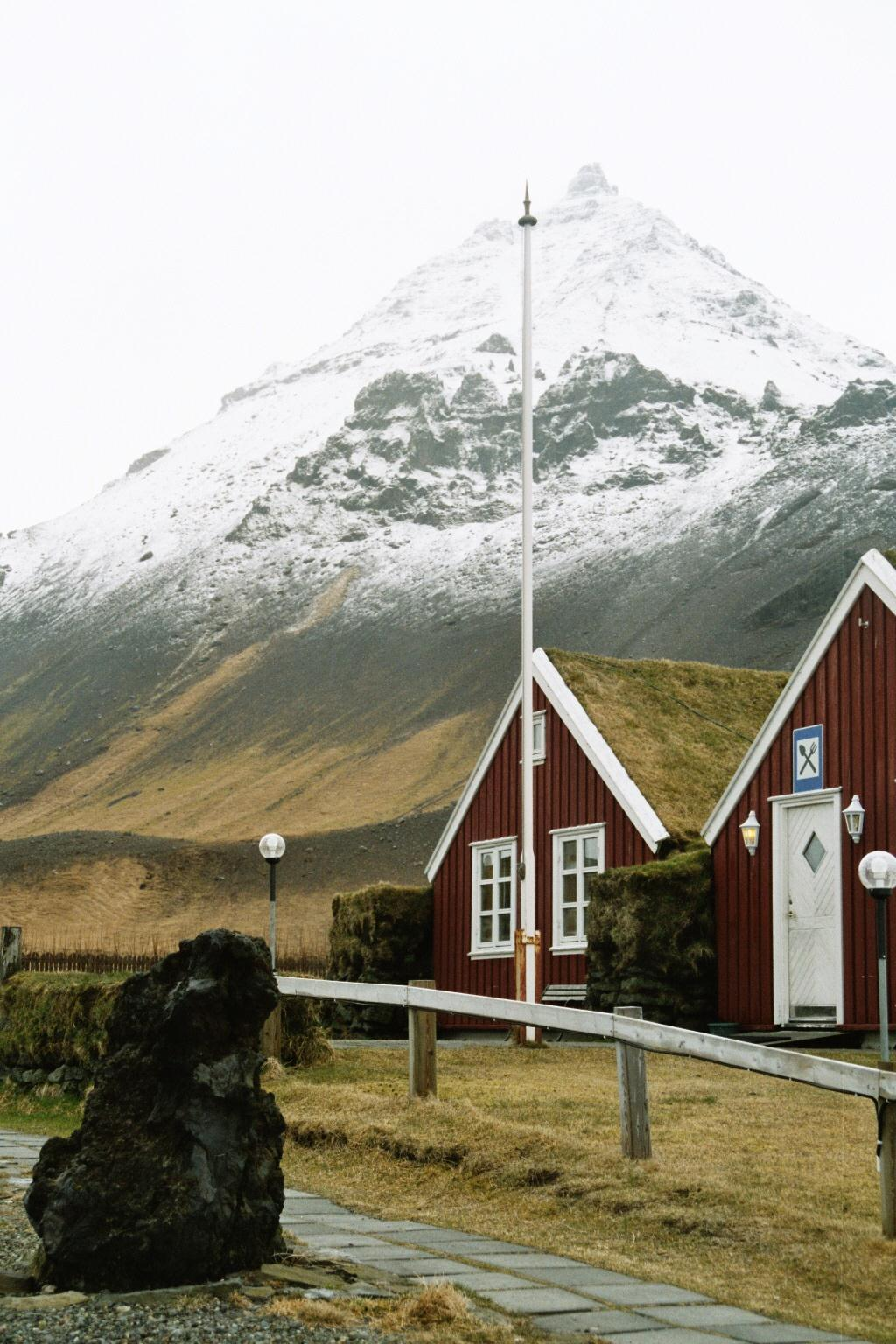
Arnarstapi on Snæfellsnes

Local fishing villages and small towns on the Snæfellsnes peninsula include Arnarstapi, Hellnar, Rif [ˈrɪːf], Ólafsvík, Grundarfjörður and Stykkishólmur.

Near Hellissandur is the tallest structure in western Europe, the Longwave Radio Mast at Hellissandur.

In June 2008, the people of Snæfellsnes reached certification status as an EarthCheck community, becoming the first EarthCheck-certified area in Iceland and in Europe, and only the fourth in the world. Snæfellsnes has been committed to the EarthCheck programme since 2003 and has been successfully benchmarked for the past five consecutive years.

== Ecology ==
On the peninsula 323 species of flowering plants and ferns have been identified and generally the plant ecology is typical of the Iceland boreal birch forests and alpine tundra ecosystem. Ligusticum scoticum (Scots lovage, Scottish licorice-root) is an edible plant only found in Iceland on the western aspects of the peninsula. Along the southern coast are many relatively undisturbed wetland habitats with diversity in the plants present. There are 13 species of wading birds found in Snæfellsnes and many other aquatic birds.

Breiðafjörður is an important marine ecosystem with its seaweed and kelp forests and the largest seal and maritime bird populations in Iceland. Seal hunting was banned in Iceland in 2019, after a major reduction in numbers after 1980. Killer whale pods are often found off the western part of the peninsula and many other whales can be seen, noting that some whaling has been allowed by Iceland since 2003. Over 60 species of birds nest in Snæfellsnes. Puffins tend to be found on the western peninsula and are not present in winter. White-tailed eagle populations in Iceland only started recovering in the 1970s after being a protected species from 1913 and other birds of prey are found. Short-eared owls, a protected bird in Iceland, are common in areas of the Snæfellsnes.

Up to settlement only the arctic fox was present as top carnivore but now as elsewhere in Iceland there are many other introduced mammals that affect the ecosystem. The arctic fox is generally separated into highland and low land populations with the later having a reddish brown coat all year. Within the Snæfellsjökull National Park fox hunting has been banned since 2001. The American mink colonised the peninsula early after its escape into the wild in Iceland in 1932 and since then the Icelandic population peaked about 2003 without any evidence that human hunting is the reason for the recent decline in population. While there are four rodents in the wild in Iceland, only the wood mouse is found in large numbers on Snæfellsnes.

In 2025, Snæfellsjökull National Park was designated as a biosphere reserve by UNESCO.

== See also ==
- Geography of Iceland
- Volcanism of Iceland
- EarthCheck
