= Bolli Bollason =

Icelandic Viking warrior

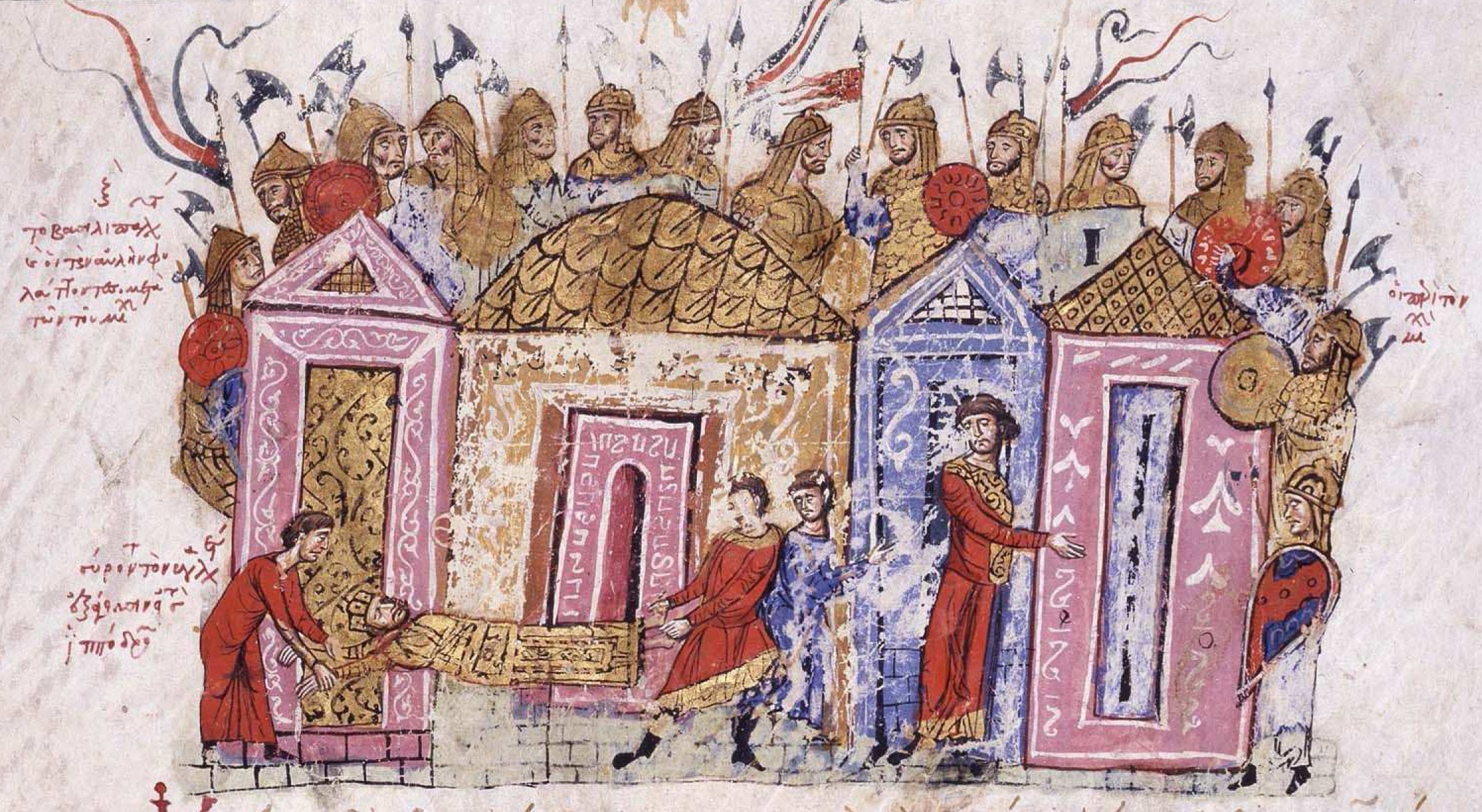
Varangian Guardsmen, from the near contemporary Skylitzis Chronicle.

Bolli Bollason (also Bolli Bollison) was a key historical character in the Medieval Icelandic Laxdæla saga, born around 1004. He grew up in Orlygsstadir, at Helgafell on the Snæfellsnes Peninsula in Iceland. He divided his time between Helgafell and Tunga, the home of Snorri the goði. (Note: In English versions of the saga, Helgafell and Tunga are sometimes translated as "Holyfell" and "Tongue" respectively.) He was held in the highest regard among the contemporary Scandinavian rulers, and also in the Eastern Roman Empire. (Note: Chapter 73: "…from what we have heard, no Northman had ever gone to take warpay from the Garth king before Bolli, Bolli's son". "Northman" in the saga can be taken to mean a "West Norseman" — an Icelander or Norwegian — as Old Norse had split along East/West lines. According to the Annales Bertiniani, the Swedes had reached "Miklagarðr" (Constantinople) in the 830s, and many of them were in the service of the Empire prior Bolli's arrival.) It is believed that he had reached the rank of manglabites in the Eastern Roman army, and on his return to Iceland, his finery and recognition earned him the name "Bolli the Elegant".

His importance in the literary context of the saga is his prominence as the son of Bolli Þorleiksson and Guðrún Ósvífursdóttir, the two central characters of the work. He is mentioned at the end of the Sneglu-Hall þáttur (The Tale of Sarcastic Halli), and is also the subject of his own tale, the Bollaþáttur, which was later appended to the end of the manuscripts in the early 14th century.

== Laxdæla saga ==
=== Background ===
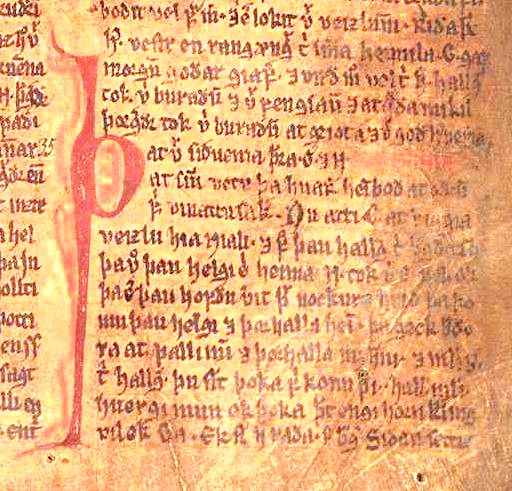
A page of Njál's saga from the Möðruvallabók, the same vellum manuscript containing the Laxdæla saga and the Bollaþáttur

The Laxdæla saga or Saga of the People of Laxardal is an Icelandic family saga written sometime between 1250 and 1270, possibly by a woman author. "Vast in conception", the grand sweep of the saga's action spans well over a century from AD 890 to 1030. Alongside Njál's saga and Egil's saga, the Laxdæla saga makes the strongest claim of any Icelandic saga for literary greatness. Shaped by continental literary traditions and several types of saga, the characterisation "highlights nobility, splendour and physical appearance", although:

…in their actions the male characters tend not to live up to the grandeur and hyperbole with which they are presented. At foreign courts their stature is aristocratic, but at home in Iceland they are farmers with few outlets other than words and smart clothes for their aspirations to nobility. This is a saga in which even slaves are high-born, descended from the kings of Ireland.

The saga is also a feud saga, in which "feuds escalate from trivial local squabbles into unstoppable vendettas. The male protagonists are splendid figures who die heroic deaths, while the women are strong characters who engineer much of the action".

Many manuscripts of the Laxdæla saga have survived, although all printed versions have been based upon the Möðruvallabók (dated 1330-1370), the only intact vellum manuscript. Historiographically, the distinction between narrative and history did not exist at the time when the sagas were written. However, the sagas develop a "dense and plausible" historical context, with the authenticating details and precision necessary for the narrative. The world within which the local and detailed stories of the individual sagas exist can be confirmed by archaeology and comparison with histories in other languages.

=== Account ===
==== Family and early life ====
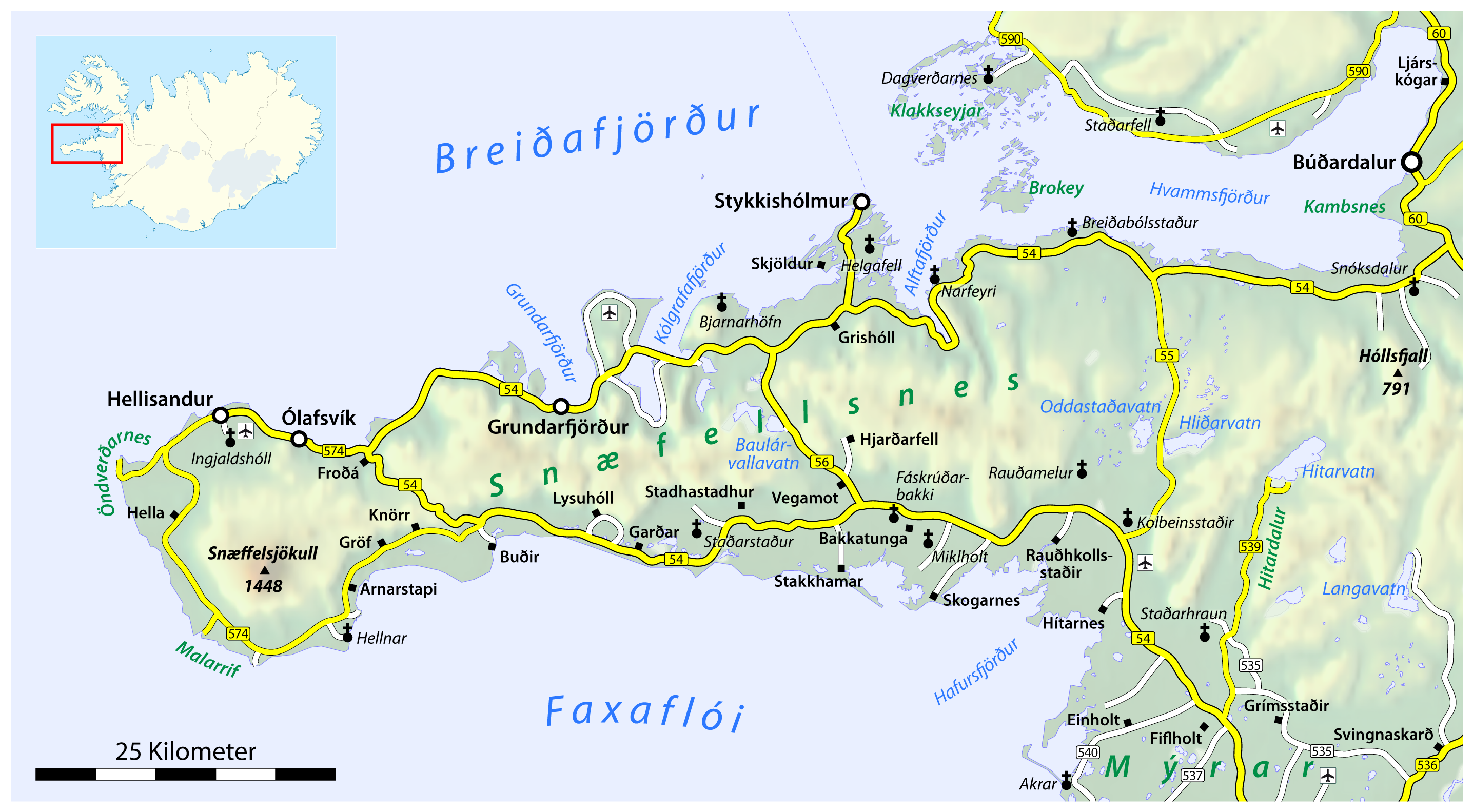
Snæfellsnes, where Bolli was born.

Bolli Bollason was one of the People of Laxárdalur, in the Western Quarter of Iceland. He was born in 1004 to Guðrún Ósvífursdóttir, the winter after the killing of his father, Bolli Þorleiksson. Guðrún had been courted by Bolli Þorleiksson and his foster-brother Kjartan Ólafsson, but although she preferred Kjartan, she gave herself to Bolli Þorleiksson on the basis of a false rumour that Kjartan was engaged. The consequent hostilities between the two foster-brothers ended with Bolli Þorleiksson killing Kjartan, and then he in turn being killed by Kjartan's kinsmen. Bolli Bollason grew up with his brother Thorleik, who was four years his senior, and his mother Guðrún in Helgafell, after she exchanged homes with the renowned Snorri goði.

Guðrún remarried, this time to Þorkell Eyjólffsson, who became a great chieftain in his own countryside and took over the running of the household at Helgafell. This left Bolli able to spend his time both at Helgafell and with Snorri in Tunga, and Snorri became very fond of him. Thorkell was fond of both his stepsons, but Bolli was regarded as "being the foremost in all things". Thorleik journeyed abroad to Norway, and stayed with King Olaf II for several months.

When Bolli was eighteen years old he asked for his father's portion, as he intended to woo Þórdís Snorradóttir, the daughter of Snorri goði. He set out with his stepfather and a good many followers to Tunga. Snorri welcomed them, and the wedding feast took place that summer. Bolli abode at Tunga, and love grew between him and Þórdís. The next summer, Thorleik returned in a goods-laden ship to White-river, "and the brothers greeted each other joyfully".

The two brothers made peace with the sons of Ólaf, Kjartan's kinsmen, at the Thorness Thing; it is not known how much money was exchanged in compensation as part of the agreement, but Bolli received a good sword, and after the assembly "both sides were thought to have gained in esteem from these affairs".

==== Travels abroad ====
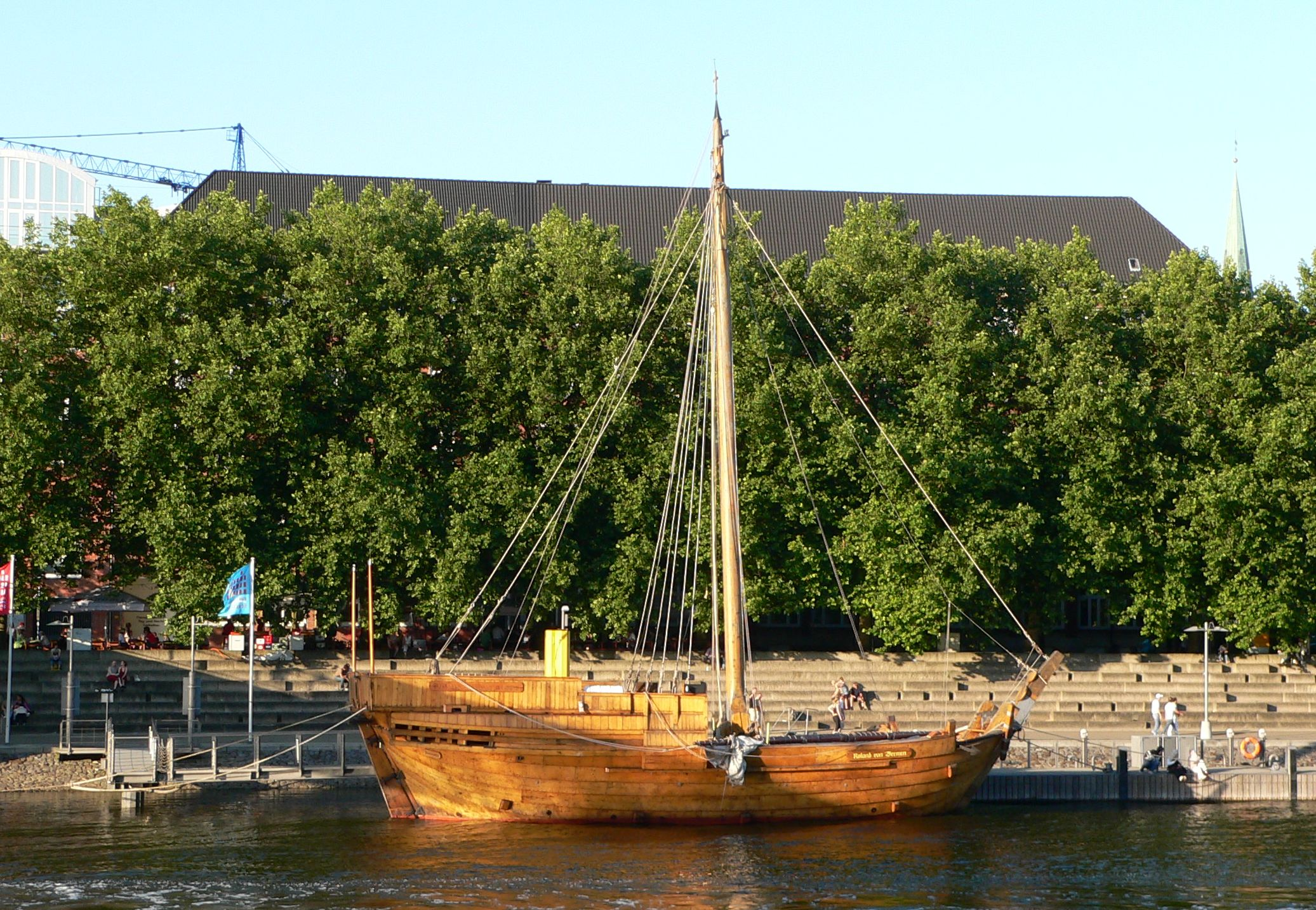
A trade-cog of the type that Bolli might have taken to Denmark. (Note: Although the 1899 Muriel Press translation uses the ambiguous "trade-ship" for knarrarbátinn (Chapter LXXIII), the newer 2001 Penguin edition translates it as "cog".)

Bolli's later travels abroad with his brother Thorleik are well documented and notable for his role in the Varangian Guard. They departed Iceland, taking "a great deal of money abroad with him", and reached Norway in the autumn. They stayed in Thrandheim for the winter, while King Olaf II was wintering in the east in Sarpsborg. Bolli soon became highly thought of in Norway, and his arrivals at the guild meeting-places were noted for being better arrayed as to raiment and weapons than other townsfolk. Early in the spring the brothers prepared their ship and went east to meet the king. The king thought Bolli "a man of high mettle," "even peerless among men", and "the man of greatest mark that has ever come from Iceland."

Bolli boarded a trade-ship bound for Denmark, departing King Olaf in great friendship and with fine parting gifts.^{[Note 2]} Thorleik remained behind, but Bolli wintered in Denmark and became as well regarded as he had been in Norway. Travelling next to Constantinople, he spent many years in the Varangian Guard; "and was thought to be the most valiant in all deeds that try a man, and always went next to those in the forefront." The saga also records the finery his followers received from the Roman Emperor (most likely Romanos III), and the influence he held after his return to Iceland, some time after the death of King Olaf II:

Bolli rode from the ship with twelve men, and all his followers were dressed in scarlet, and rode on gilt saddles, and all were they a trusty band, though Bolli was peerless among them. He had on the clothes of fur which the Garth-king had given him, he had over all a scarlet cape; and he had Footbiter girt on him, the hilt of which was dight with gold, and the grip woven with gold, he had a gilded helmet on his head, and a red shield on his flank, with a knight painted on it in gold. He had a dagger in his hand, as is the custom in foreign lands; and whenever they took quarters the women paid heed to nothing but gazing at Bolli and his grandeur, and that of his followers.

—

The right to bear a gold-hilted sword was one of the privileges of the court rank of manglabites, and is taken as an indicator that Bolli held this rank. In Iceland, his finery and recognition earned him the name "Bolli the Elegant". His return to Thordis was joyful, and he took over the manor of Tunga when Snorri died at 67 years of age. Bolli had two children with Thordis: Herdis Bolladottir and Ospak Bollason.

== Tales ==
=== Bollaþáttur ===
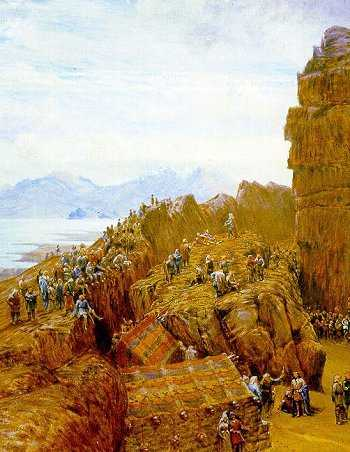
The Althing at Þingvellir, which Bolli attended the same year he killed Thorolf Stuck-up

In Norse literature, a tale or þáttur referred to a short narrative often included as an episode in a larger whole, such as part of a saga. The Bolla þáttur Bollasonar, or Bolli Bollason's Tale, is such a narrative about an episode in the life of Bolli Bollason, taken from the 14th century Möðruvallabók which contains the Laxdæla saga.

According to the tale, a man called Thorolf Stuck-up had a bull which wounded his neighbours' farm animals, damaged haystacks and caused "a great deal of trouble". When an upstanding local farmer named Thord saw the bull damaging the stacks of peat on his farm at Marbaeli, he lunged at the animal with a spear and struck it dead. In revenge, Thorolf killed Thord's seven- or eight-year-old son Olaf, to the disgust of Thorolf's wife and kinsmen. Thorolf fled and eventually secured the protection of Thorvald Hjaltasson, a prominent leader who lived at Hjaltadal. After Christmas, Thorvald secured for him the safekeeping and support of Starri of Guddalir, who often sheltered outlaws.

Thord's wife Gudrun, a first cousin of Bolli, asked him to take over the prosecution of the case. Accompanied by Arnor Crone's-nose and a large company of men, Bolli attended the Hegranes Assembly. Thorvald and Starri intended to block the prosecution "by force of arms and numbers", but when they realised they were outnumbered, they withdrew and Bolli successfully had Thorolf outlawed. Passage out of Iceland was obtained for Thorolf aboard a merchant vessel at Hrutafjord. However, Bolli believed it would have been improper if the outlawed Thorolf were to escape, and having ridden north to Hrutafjord, he drew his sword Leg-biter and "struck a blow right through" Thorolf, killing him.

He earned himself a great deal of honour by this, as men thought it quite an accomplishment to have the man outlawed in another district and then venture alone into the hands of his enemies and kill him there.

=== Sneglu-Halla þáttr ===
Bolli died during the reign of Harald III of Norway, as is recorded at the end of The Tale of Sarcastic Halli. The tale makes reference to Bolli's military prowess, in ironic contrast to the tale's protagonist:

Harald learned of the deaths of two of his men from Iceland, Bolli the Elegant and Sarcastic Halli.

He said of Boli, "The warrior must have fallen victim to spears."

But of Halli he said, "The poor devil must have burst eating porridge"

—
