= Snorri Goði =

Icelandic chieftain (963–1031)

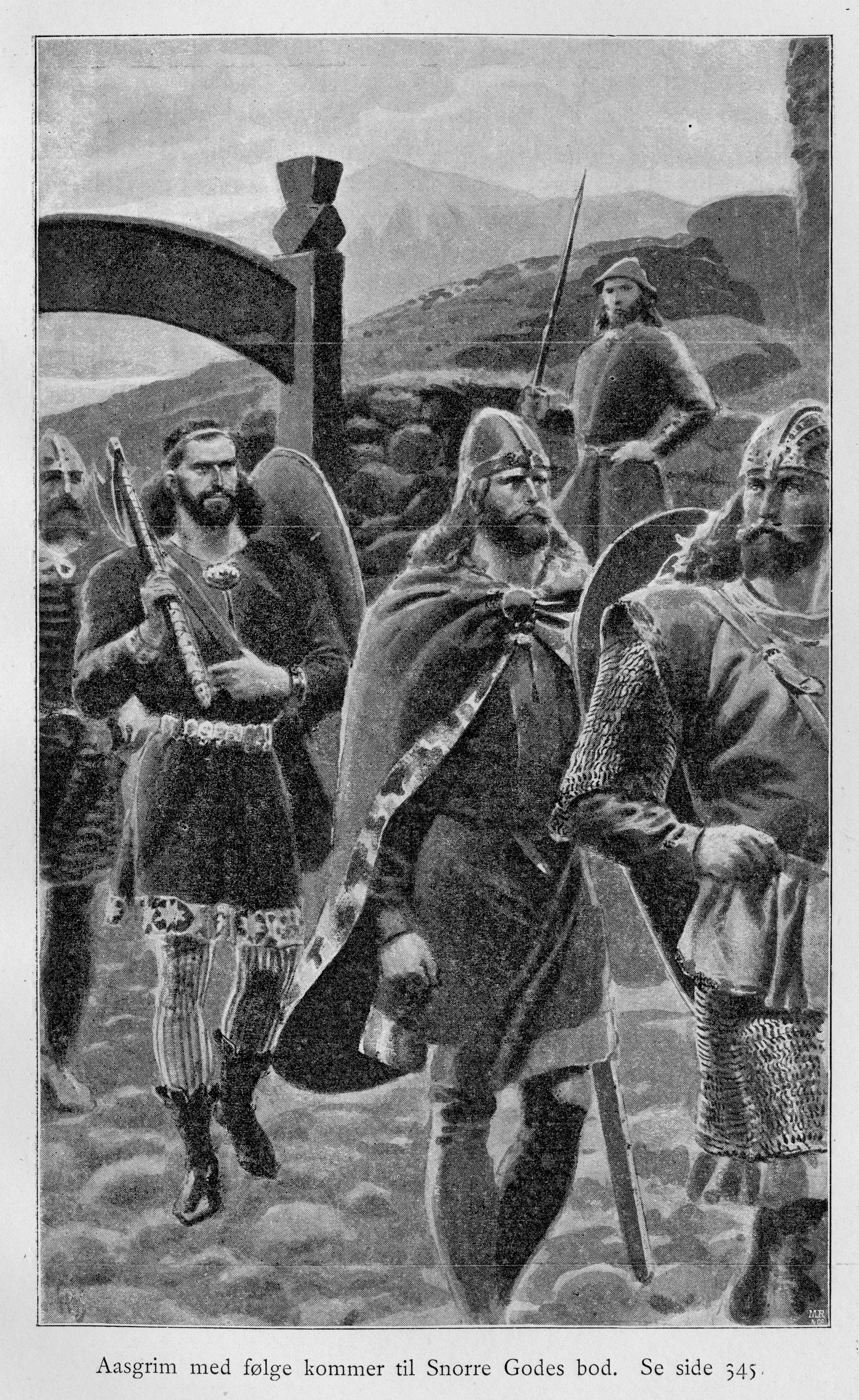
Aasgrim follows Snorri Goði in Njáls saga

Snorri Þorgrímsson (Old Norse: [ˈsnorːe ˈθorˌɡriːmsˌson]; Modern Icelandic: [ˈstnɔrːɪ ˈθɔrˌkrimsˌsɔːn]) or Snorri goði (O.N.: [ˈɡoðe]; M.I.: [ˈkɔːðɪ]; 963–1031) was a prominent chieftain in Western Iceland, who featured in a number of Icelandic sagas. The main source of his life is the Eyrbyggja saga, in which he is the main character, although he also figures prominently in Njál's saga and the Laxdæla saga. Snorri was the nephew of Gísli Súrsson, the hero of Gísla saga, and son of Þorgrímr Þorsteinsson, whom Gísli killed in revenge to fulfil a blood-oath.

Eyrbyggja Saga says of him, "He was a very shrewd man with unusual foresight, a long memory and a taste for vengeance. To his friends he gave good counsel, but his enemies learned to fear the advice he gave." Njál's saga says of him, "Snorri was reckoned the wisest man in Iceland, not counting those who were prescient".

== Background of sources ==
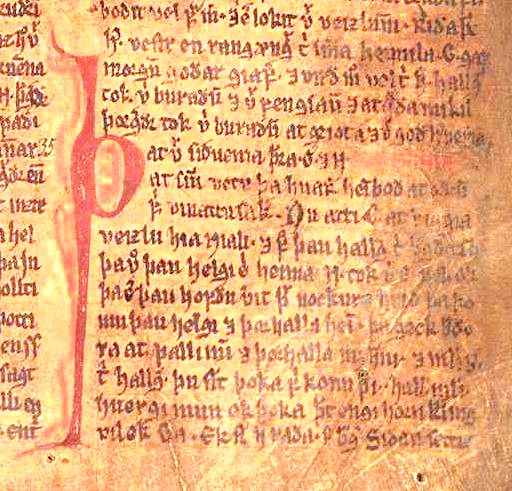
A page from the vellum manuscript Möðruvallabók, which contains Njál's saga and the Laxdæla saga, both sources of Snorri's life

The main sources of Snorri's life are the semi-historical Icelandic sagas. Historiographically, the distinction between narrative and history did not exist at the time when the sagas were written. However, the sagas develop a "dense and plausible" historical context, with the authenticating details and precision necessary for the narrative. The world within which the local and detailed stories of the individual sagas exist can be confirmed by archaeology and comparison with histories in other languages.

Snorri features prominently in the two sagas which, alongside Egil's saga, make the strongest claim of any Icelandic saga for literary greatness: Njál's saga and the Laxdæla saga. The Laxdæla saga or Saga of the People of Laxardal was written sometime between 1250 and 1270, possibly by a woman. "Vast in conception", the grand sweep of the saga's action spans well over a century from AD 890 to 1030. The work is both a family saga and a feud saga, in which "feuds escalate from trivial local squabbles into unstoppable vendettas. The male protagonists are splendid figures who die heroic deaths, while the women are strong characters who engineer much of the action".

Eyrbyggja Saga was written during the 13th century, and like the other sagas, it partly draws on written sources such as Landnámabók, and other sagas such as Laxdæla saga. One of Snorri's daughters, Þuríðr, died in 1112 at the age of 88, and was one of the informants for Ari Þorgilsson, co-author of the first version of Landnámabók.

== Life ==
=== Family and childhood ===
Snorri's father, Þorgrímr, was killed by his brother-in-law, Gísli Súrsson, just before Snorri's birth. He was originally named Þorgrímr, but because he was a difficult child, he was called Snerrir and then later Snorri, both names meaning a turbulent, warlike person. His mother Þórdís súrsdóttir later married her late husband's brother Börkr the Stout, and moved to his property at Helgafell.

Snorri was fostered by Þorbrandr of Álftafjörðr. When he was fourteen, he and his foster brothers travelled to Norway, where they traded successfully. Some time after coming back, Snorri demanded his inheritance from his uncle and stepfather, Börkr. Börkr would not divide Helgafell and demanded sixty ounces of silver for the whole property. Börkr had granted Snorri fifty ounces before his trading voyage, but presumed, due to Snorri's deceptively humble dress, that this gift had been squandered. However, Snorri was able to produce this from his trading profits, and so he bought Helgafell from Börkr. Thordis also decided to divorce Börkr, and Börkr was required to leave Helgafell.

Snorri married Asdis, the daughter of Styr, after helping Styr to plan the killing of two Swedish berserks who were causing trouble for Styr and his family, whilst they were living in Styr's household.

=== Feuds with Arnkel and others ===
Thorbjorn the Stout, who was married to Snorri's half-sister Thurid (the daughter of Börkr the Stout), accused Geirríðr, the sister of Arnkell Þórólfsson, of witchcraft. Arnkell was a chief and, like Snorri, one of the most influential men in the area. In the ensuing case, Snorri and Arnkell each backed their own families, and Geirrid was cleared of the charge. Thorbjorn later on accused Geirríð's son Þórarinn the Black of stealing his horses. This led to a battle in which Thorbjorn was killed. Snorri pursued the case at the local assembly and had Þórarinn exiled.

Snorri became involved in further disputes with Arnkell Þórólfsson. This included a property dispute between Arnkel and the Thorbrandssons. He and his foster brothers, the Thorbrandssons, attacked and killed Arnkel whilst he was working on his farm. In the ensuing court case, only one of the assailants, Thorleif Thorbrandsson, was sentenced to outlawry. This was blamed on the fact that all of Arnkel's heirs were female. This led to a change in the law that decreed that women (and men under sixteen) could not raise a manslaughter action.

Snorri later sided with the Thorbrandssons in their feud with the Thorlakssons. He took part in the battle of Alftafjord on their side and rescued them after they were all wounded at the battle of Vigrafjord. A settlement was later reached between the two families.

Snorri also attempted to kill Bjorn Asbrandsson, who was the lover of his sister Thurid. She was now married to Thorodd the Tribute Trader, a marriage which Snorri had helped to arrange. Bjorn fended off Snorri's attack, but was convinced to leave Iceland. Thurid's son Kjartan was suspected of being the son of Bjorn rather than Thorodd.

=== Later years ===
When Iceland converted to Christianity in 1000, Snorri had a church built at Helgafell.

After the killing of Bolli Þorleiksson by the Olafssons, Snorri and Bolli's widow Guðrún Ósvífursdóttir agreed to exchange properties so that she moved to Helgafell, and Snorri moved to Saelingsdale Tongue. Snorri later helped to arrange a peace agreement between the Olafssons and Guðrún's sons.

Snorri also took action over the killing of his father-in-law, Styr. The case against the killer was dismissed at the Althing by Thorstein Gislason. In retaliation, Snorri later killed Thorstein and his son Gunnar. This led to further battles between the kinsmen and allies of the two sides. The dispute was eventually settled at the local assembly.

In his later years, Snorri successfully led the fight against Ospak Kjallaksson, a farmer who had assembled a gang that had taken to attacking and robbing his neighbours. Ospak and the other leaders of the gang were killed, and the rest were made to disperse. Ospak's son was allowed to inherit his father's farm.

At the Althing which followed the burning of Njáll Þorgeirsson, Snorri supported Njal's kinsmen. When fighting broke out, Snorri stopped the retreat of Flosi Thordarsson and the other burners. Snorri and the Lawspeaker Skapti Þóroddsson, both then got their men to separate the two sides, and so stop the fighting. Afterwards, Snorri was one of the men chosen to arrange a settlement between the two parties.

== Descendants ==
Snorri had many children and was able to make marriage alliances with other leading families. For example, his daughter Sigrid married the son of his former opponent, Thormod Thorlaksson. His daughter Thordis married Bolli Bollason. Snorri's descendants included the Sturlungs through his son Halldor.

Snorri's son Halldórr was the subject of two tales detailing Halldórr's service in the retinue of the Norwegian king Haraldr Sigurðarson.

== In later fiction ==
Snorri Goði also features in Allen French's historical novel The Story of Rolf and the Viking Bow, in Tim Severin's historical saga Viking, and in Jeff Janoda's historical novel Saga.

== Sources ==
- Eyrbyggja Saga. Palsson, Hermann; Edwards, Paul (trans.). Penguin Classics. 1972.
- Laxdæla Saga. Magnusson, Magnus; Palsson, Hermann (trans.). Penguin Classics. 1969.
- Njal's Saga. Magnusson, Magnus; Palsson, Hermann (trans.). Penguin Classics. 1960.
- Grettir's Saga. Scudder, Bernard (trans.). Penguin Classics. 2005.
- The Sagas of Icelanders: a selection. Örnólfur Thorsson, et al. (eds.). Penguin Books. 2000.
