= Jorunn Bjarnadottir =

Character in Icelandic sagas

Jórunn Bjarnadóttir (Old Norse: [ˈjoːronː ˈbjɑrnɑˌdoːtːez̠]; Modern Icelandic: [ˈjouːrʏn ˈpja(r)tnaˌtouhtɪr̥]) is a female character who appears in Laxdœla saga, one of the Icelandic family sagas (Icelandic: Íslendingasögur). She first appears in chapter 9, where she is introduced as the wife of a powerful Icelandic chieftain (Icelandic: goði) Höskuldr Dala-Kollsson from Höskuldsstaðir in Laxárdalur, Iceland.

== Family ==
Jórunn Bjarnadóttir is the daughter of Björn who settled Bjarnarfjörðr in North-Western Iceland. He is described as being both highly-born and very wealthy (stórættaður maður og auðigr að fé). Jórunn's mother is a woman named Ljúfa, although no further description is given. However, Jana K. Schulman in her article "Make Me a Match: Motifs of Betrothal in the Sagas of the Icelanders." suggests that in the sagas, successful relationships are portrayed as being composed of partners of equal status and standing. This would then indicate that Ljúfa would have come from a similar background as husband, Björn.

Bjarnadottir is the mother of two sons, Thorleikr and Bárðr, and two daughters, Hallgerðr longbrók and Þuríðr. She is the grandmother of Bolli Thorleiksson who features prominently throughout the later half of Laxdœla saga.

== Characteristics ==
Bjarnadottir is initially described in Laxdœla saga as "a good-looking woman, very proud, and no less clever. She was considered the best match in the entire West Fjords." Following her marriage to Höskuldr, it became apparent that in addition to her cleverness, she was also skillful and experienced, although at times headstrong.

== Biography ==
=== Marriage to Höskuldr ===
Upon hearing of Jórunn as well as learning that her father, Björn, was one of the most prominent farmers in all of Strandir, he set off with a group of men to seek her hand in marriage. Although Björn received both him and his marriage proposal well, he deferred the question to Jórunn herself for her opinion. Jórunn responds that because of his reputation she knows that any woman who marries him will be well cared for. However, she ultimately turns the decision back over to her father and the betrothal is agreed upon with a large dowry.

The wedding was held at Höskuld's farm Höskuldsstaðir with many guests from both sides of the families. It was called a very grand wedding feast and all the guests returned home happy with many wonderful gifts.

Although she and Hoskuld got along well together, strong affection was seldom shown between them.

=== Jórunn and Melkorka ===
Later when Höskuldr returns from another trip to Norway with Melkorka, a concubine whom he purchased from Gilli the Russian, Jórunn mocks him for not knowing her name or even talking with her before carrying on relations with her. Despite Höskuldr's request to treat Melkorka with respect, Jórunn displays disdain towards her, viewing herself as far-superior to Melkorka who is not only a slave but at this point considered to be both deaf and dumb. Although the saga says that Höskuldr from that point on had little to do with Melkorka and slept with Jórunn every night, tensions did not ease. Eventually, Jórunn demands that Melkorka move out of their home or else she herself would leave.

Although the saga author puts stock in Melkorka's royal Irish heritage, as seen through both Höskuldr's reaction to the revelation ("Hoskuld said that she had too long concealed such a noble birth.") as well as Egill Skallagrímsson's when speaking of Ólafr pái who is Melkorka and Höskuldr's son ("haven’t you heard that he is the grandson of king Myrkjartan? He’s of even better family on his mother’s side that his father’s, which is more than good enough for us."), Jórunn's attitude towards her is unaffected. In fact, Jórunn is quite skeptical of Melkorka's claim and she continues to look down on her as a common slave. Tensions come to a head when Jórunn picks up one of her socks and hits Melkorka with it. In response, Melkorka hits her in the face and causes her nose to bleed. The result of this altercation was that Höskuldr had Melkorka moved to a different farm even further up the river.

== Sources ==
Kunz, Keneva, trans. "The Saga of the People of Laxardal." In The Sagas of Icelanders: A Selection, edited by Jane Smiley, 270–421. New York: Penguin, 2005.

“Laxdœla saga.” in Laxdœla Saga, edited by Einar Ól. Sveinsson, 1–248. Vol. 5. Íslenzk Fornrit. Reykjavík: Hið Íslenzka Fornritafélag, 1934.
