= Melkorkustaðir =

Farm in Iceland

Melkorkustead (Old Norse: Melkorkustaðir [ˈmelˌkorkoˌstɑðez̠]; Modern Icelandic: [ˈmɛlˌkʰɔr̥kʏˌstaːðɪr̥]) was a farm in western Iceland during the Icelandic Commonwealth period. It was the home of Melkorka, mother of the gothi Olaf the Peacock.

The name in Irish could be Myr Kjartan King of Irland or mael-Curcaigh or Muirchertach of the Leather Cloaks, King of Aileach son af Niall Glundubh.
