= Hoskuld Dala-Kollsson =

Icelandic chieftain

Hoskuld Dala-Kollsson (Old Norse: Hǫskuldr Dala-Kollsson [ˈhɔˌskuldz̠ ˈdɑlɑ-ˌkolːsˌson]; Modern Icelandic: Höskuldur Dala-Kollsson [ˈhœˌskʏltʏr ˈtaːlaˌkɔlsˌsɔːn]; c. 910–965) was an Icelandic gothi or chieftain of the early Icelandic Commonwealth period. He was the son of Dala-Koll (Koll of the Dales) who has a fjörd named after him, and Thorgerd Thorsteinsdottir, daughter of Thorstein the Red. His father died when he was a child and his mother married a landowner named Herjolf, who became the father of Hoskuld's half-brother Hrútr Herjólfsson. Hoskuld was enormously influential in northwestern Iceland, particularly in the Laxardal region, and is one of the main characters of the first half of Laxdæla saga. By his wife Jorunn he was the father of Bard, Thorleik, and Hallgerd and the grandfather of Bolli Thorleiksson. By his Irish slave Melkorka he was the father of Olaf the Peacock and possibly of another son named Helgi.
