= Guðrúnarlaug =

Thermal bath in Iceland

Coordinates: 65.244633°N 21.802968°W

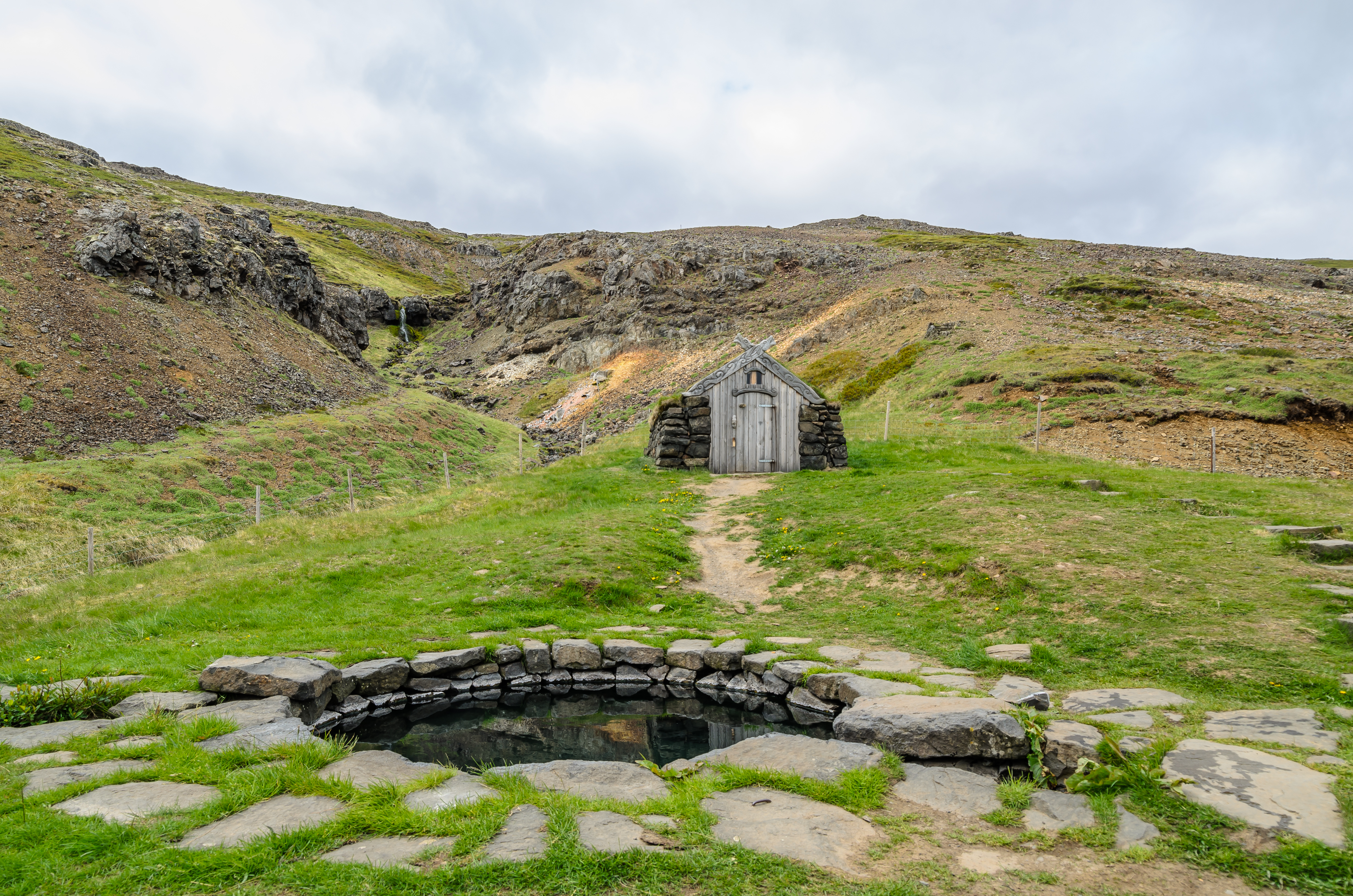
The reconstructed thermal bath

Guðrúnarlaug (Icelandic pronunciation: [ˈkvʏðˌruːnarˌlœyːx]) is a thermal bath in Iceland near Sælingsdalur [ˈsaiːliŋsˌtaːlʏr̥] in the municipality of Dalabyggð. The name stems from Guðrún Ósvífrsdóttir, who is a main character in Laxdæla saga. The thermal bath exists at the place described in the saga.

== Reference in Laxdæla saga ==
In Laxdæla saga Guðrúnarlaug (literally "Guðrún's pool" in Icelandic) is called "the Baths of Saelingsdale":

Gestur ríður nú um daginn vestan úr Saurbæ og kemur til Sælingsdalslaugar og dvelst þar um hríð. Guðrún kom til laugar og fagnar vel Gesti frænda sínum. Gestur tók henni vel og taka þau tal saman og voru þau bæði vitur og orðig.

Now Guest rideth westward all day from Saurby and cometh to the Baths of Saelingsdale, and abides there awhile. Gudrun came to the Baths and greeteth well Guest her kinsman. Guest took her greeting well, and they fall to speech together, for both of them were wise and many-spoken.

== See also ==
- Culture of Iceland
- Sagas of Icelanders
- History of Iceland
- Guðrún Ósvífrsdóttir
- Laxdæla saga
- Tourism in Iceland
