= Melkorka =

11th century Irish enslaved woman in Iceland, mother of Olaf the Peacock

Melkorka (Old Norse: [ˈmelˌkorkɑ]; Modern Icelandic: [ˈmɛlˌkʰɔr̥ka]) is the name given in Landnámabók and Laxdæla saga for the Irish mother of the Icelandic goði Ólafr Höskuldsson. It is possible that her name represents the Irish Mael Curcaig.

According to Laxdæla saga, Hoskuld Dala-Kollsson purchased Melkorka, whom he believed to be a selective mute thrall-woman, from a Rus' merchant on Brännöyar while on a trading expedition to Norway, and made her his concubine while away from his wife Jorunn Bjarnadottir. When Höskuldur returned home to Iceland, he took her with him. Despite Jórunn's irritation, the concubine was accepted into Höskuldr's household, though he remained faithful to Jórunn while in Iceland. The following winter the concubine gave birth to a son, to whom they gave the name Ólafr after Höskuldr's uncle, Olaf Feilan, who had recently died. Landnámabók mentions that Höskuldr and Melkorka had another son, Helgi, but he does not appear in Laxdæla.

According to Laxdæla saga, Ólafr was a precocious child, and could speak and walk perfectly by the age of two. One day Höskuldr discovered Ólafr's mother speaking to her son; she was not, in fact, mute. When he confronted her she told him that she was an Irish princess named Melkorka carried off in a viking raid, and that her father was an Irish king named "Myrkjartan" (Muirchertach) who has been associated with Muirchertach mac Néill. Shortly thereafter squabbling between Jórunn and Melkorka forced Höskuldr to move his concubine and his son by her to a different farm, which thereafter was known as Melkorkustaðir. The fact that there is another site known by this name, at Borgarfordur, could indicate that Melkorka's name is not Gaelic in origin, but is instead derived from a name composed of the elements melr ("gravel hillock") and korka ("wasting away").

Around 956, Ólafr, at Melkorka's urging, decided to go abroad to seek his fortune. Melkorka taught Ólafr Irish Gaelic and urged him to visit her family. Höskuldr was opposed to the expedition and would not provide trade wares, and the property of Ólafr's foster-father Þórðr was mostly in immobile goods and land. In part to arrange financing for his expedition, his mother Melkorka married Þorbjörn skrjúpur ("the Feeble"), a farmer who had previously assisted her in the management of Melkorkustaðir. Melkorka and Þorbjörn had a son named Lambi.

Ólafr visited Ireland, where he met Melkorka's father and kinsmen, Myrkjartan. He introduced himself as Melkorka's son and explained that their kinship was his reason for visiting. Myrkjartan was not immediately convinced of their kinship, but he was impressed with Ólafr's Irish and sure that he was of high birth nevertheless. Then Ólafr showed Myrkjartan the gold ring on his arm, which Melkorka had given him when he left Iceland. It had originally been a gift from her father. After this, Myrkjartan was sure that Ólafr was his kinsman. Ólafr remained with Myrkjartan for a time, and the king, according to Laxdæla saga, even offered to make Ólafr his heir. Ólafr, however, returned to Norway, and then ultimately to Iceland, afraid of provoking Myrkjartan's sons. Ólafr had wanted to take Melkorka's nurse back to Iceland to meet her, but Myrkjartan did not permit it. After his journey, Ólafr became renowned, both for his travels and because he was the grandson of the Irish king.

== Media ==
Melkorka is featured in the 2007 young adult novel Hush: An Irish Princess' Tale by author Donna Jo Napoli. The novel depicts how she became a slave and why she decided to remain mute. The novel ends as she is being taken to Iceland by Höskuldr.

Interwoven with the biography of Fintan of Reichenau, Melkorka's fate has also been a focal point of the Austrian documentary "Victims of the Vikings" (ORF/ZDF/Arte 2021) on Viking slave trade.
