= Helgafell (Sveitarfélagið Stykkishólmur) =

Mountain in Iceland

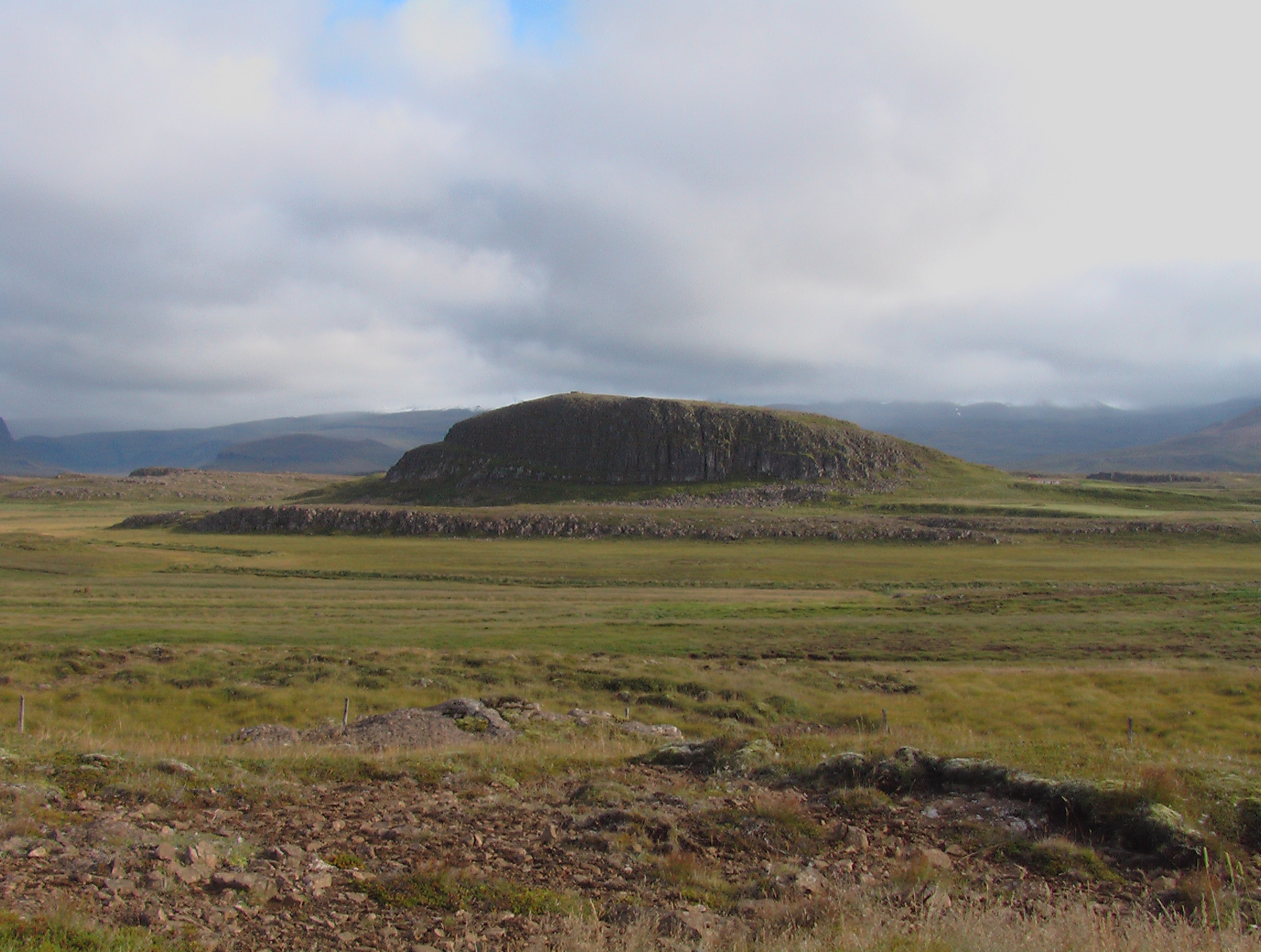

Highest point
- Elevation: 73 m (240 ft)
- Coordinates: 65°02′33″N 22°43′40″W

Geography
- Location within Iceland
- Location: Iceland

Helgafell (Icelandic pronunciation: [ˈhɛlkaˌfɛtl̥], "holy mountain") is a small mountain on the Snæfellsnes Peninsula of Iceland. The mountain is 73 metres (240 ft) high. A temple in honor of Thor (Þór) was built there by Þórólfr Mostrarskegg, the first settler of the area. His biography is described in literary form with fictional and mythical elements in Eyrbyggja saga.

Helgafell also appears in the Laxdæla saga as the location where the heroine Guðrún Ósvífrsdóttir last lived and is supposedly where she is buried.

== See also ==
- Death in Norse paganism
