= Thorgerd Egilsdottir =

Viking Age Icelandic Woman

- Þorgerður Egilsdóttir
- Born: Thorgerd Egilsdottir c.935
- Spouse: Olaf Hoskuldsson
- Children: Bergthora; Halldor; Helgi; Hoskuld; Kjartan; Steinthor; Thorbjorg; Thorgerd
- Father: Egill Skallagrímsson
- Writing career
- Language: Old Norse
- Period: Viking Age
- Movement: Skaldic Poetry

Thorgerd Egilsdottir (Old Norse: Þorgerðr Egilsdóttir [ˈθorˌɡerðz̠ ˈeɣelsˌdoːtːez̠]; Modern Icelandic: Þorgerður Egilsdóttir [ˈθɔrˌcɛrðʏr ˈeijɪlsˌtouhtɪr̥]) was an Icelandic woman of the tenth century. She was the daughter of Egill Skallagrímsson and the wife of Olaf the Peacock. Olaf and Thorgerd had a number of children: the sons Kjartan, Steinthór, Halldór, Helgi, and Höskuldur and the daughters Thurídur, Thorbjörg, Thorgerd and Bergthóra. The ill-fated Kjartan would be his father's favorite.

== Portrayal in Icelandic Sagas ==
The character of Thorgerd Egilsdottir appears in several Icelandic sagas. She first appears in Egils Saga (Egils saga Skallagrímssonar), being born to Egil Skallagrímsson and his wife Asgerd. Thorgerd was the eldest of five children. The saga states that “all of Egil’s children were promising and intelligent.” Later, the saga states that she was “a very fine woman, wise, rather strong-tempered, but usually quiet,” and that she made a favorable match with Olaf. In chapter 79 of Egil’s Saga, Thorgerd manipulates her father for his own good. After the death of his son Bodvar, a grieving Egil takes to his bed and refuses to eat. Thorgerd is summoned by her mother to help. When she arrives at her father’s home she announces in a loud voice;

I have had no evening meal, nor will I do so until I go to join Freyja. I know no better course of action than my father’s. I do not want to live after my father and brother are dead.

She then goes and lies down in another bed in her father’s bed-closet. Egil was pleased with his daughter and the love that she had shown. Soon she tricks Egil into eating dulse (or edible seaweed) by telling him that it would make him feel worse and that it was bad for him. Afterward, she tricks him into drinking milk, telling him first that it was water that she called for. After stating that “We’ve been tricked,” Thorgerd then manipulates Egil further;

What will we do now? Our plan has failed. Now I want us to stay alive, father, long enough for you to compose a poem in Bodvar’s memory and I will carve it on a rune-stick. Then we can die if we want to. I doubt whether your son Thorstein would ever compose a poem for Bodvar, and it is unseemly if his memory is not honoured, because I do not expect us to be sitting there at the feast when it is.

Egil, who was known for his poetry, composed a poem in honor of his deceased son, and in doing so soon began to recover from his grief. He eventually left his bed and gave Thorgerd gifts when she left.

Thorgerd Egilsdottir also makes an appearance in The Saga of the People of Laxardal (Laxdæla saga). In Chapter 23 her betrothal to Olaf the Peacock is described. Olaf and his father Hoskuld approached her father Egil at the Althing to make a match between Thorgerd and Olaf. Even though Egil approves of the match, he states that Thorgerd would have to be asked “because there is no man who could make Thorgerd his wife should she be set against it.” At first Thorgerd refused his offer of marriage, because she believed Olaf to beneath her in birth. After having a conversation with Olaf himself, and some convincing by her father, she finally agrees to the marriage. Her marriage was, by all accounts, an affectionate one.

Thorgerd’s character is described in Laxdæla saga as; Everyone soon realized what a woman of strong character Thorgerd was: though she was not one to waste words, once she set her mind on something there was no swaying her – things had to go the way she wanted. This strong character is seen later in the Laxdæla saga when she seeks retribution for her slain son Kjartan. Her husband agrees to a wergild for his son’s death, but Thorgerd is set on vengeance. Being female, she has little option but to encourage her other sons. She takes them for a drive past the farm of man who killed Kjartan, and says;

Here lives Bolli, your brother’s slayer, and not a shred of resemblance do you bear to your great ancestors since you won’t avenge a brother the likes of Kjartan. Never would your grandfather Egil have acted like this, and it grieves me to have such spineless sons. You would have made your father better daughters, to be married off, than sons. It shows the truth of the saying, Halldor, that “every kin has its coward”. I see only too well now that fathering such sons was Olaf’s great failing. I will address my words to you Halldor...because you’ve taken the lead among your brothers. We will turn back now; I made the journey mainly to remind you of what you seem to have forgotten.

Thorgerd’s quest for vengeance even drives her to accompany the party that sets out to kill Bolli in retaliation for Kjartan. She states that “No one knows better than I do that it is likely my sons will require some urging yet.” When Bolli was cornered, Thorgerd “urged them not to hesitate to finish Bolli off and put some space between trunk and head.”

Thorgerd Egilssdottir also makes an appearance in The Saga of Gunnlaug Serpent-Tongue (Gunnlaugs saga ormstungu). This saga tells the tale of two men competing for Helga the Fair, Egil Skallagrimsson’s granddaughter and Thorgerd’s niece. Thorgerd plays a part in saving the life of Helga when she was an infant. Helga’s father Thorstein demanded that his infant daughter be exposed to the elements to die. His wife Jofrid secretly had the girl sent to Thorgerd to raise, while telling her husband Thorstein that she had followed his wishes. Six years later Thorstein went to attend a feast at his brother-in-law Olaf the Peacock’s estate. He noticed Helga sitting in the hall and remarked on her beauty. Thorgerd then told him the truth;

“Kinsman”, she answered, “to tell the truth, this beautiful girl is your daughter, not mine.” Then she told him everything that had happened, and begged him to forgive both her and his wife for this wrong.

Thorstein was so taken with the child that he forgave the women. He considered himself lucky that they had fixed his wrongs and he took his daughter home.

Thorgerd Egilsdottir fits a common character archetype in Norse sagas; the female inciter. In this instance a woman manipulates her husband or other male kin to exact revenge for her. In Scandinavian society at the time, women were unable to physically seek vengeance; therefore they used the means at their disposal, namely words and influence, to accomplish their goals.
