= Möðruvallabók =

14th-century Icelandic manuscript

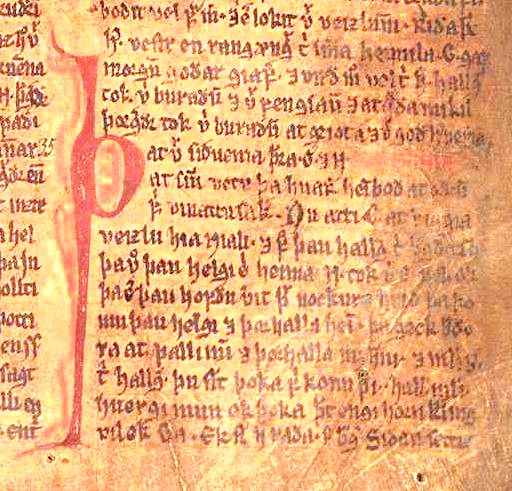
A page of Njáls saga from Möðruvallabók

Möðruvallabók (Icelandic pronunciation: [ˈmœðrʏˌvatlaˌpouːk]) or AM 132 fol is an Icelandic manuscript from the mid-14th century, inscribed on vellum. It contains the following Icelandic sagas in this order:

- Njáls saga
- Egils saga
- Finnboga saga ramma
- Bandamanna saga
- Kormáks saga
- Víga-Glúms saga
- Droplaugarsona saga
- Ölkofra þáttr
- Hallfreðar saga
- Laxdœla saga
- Bolla þáttr Bollasonar
- Fóstbrœðra saga

Many of those sagas are preserved in fragments elsewhere but are only found in their full length in Möðruvallabók, which contains the largest known single repertoire of Icelandic sagas of the Middle Ages.

The manuscript takes its name from Möðruvellir [ˈmœðrʏˌvɛtlɪr̥], the farm in Eyjafjörður where it was found. In 1628, Magnús Björnsson signed his name in it with the location. It was brought to Denmark in 1684 by Magnús Björnsson's son Björn, who gifted it to Thomas Bartholin. Árni Magnússon acquired the manuscript in 1691 after Bartholin's death, and it was incorporated into the Arnamagnæan Collection. It was returned to Iceland in 1974 after the collection's division into an Icelandic and a Danish section. Margaret Clunies Ross has asserted that the saga was arranged geographically, and Emily Lethbridge has shown that Njáls saga could have been treated as a separate text from the rest of the extant manuscript.

The manuscript is bound with two pieces of oak wood, has 200 parchment pages, and is 33.5 x 22 cm. Parts of Njals saga, Egils saga, and Fóstbræðra saga are missing from it. Initially, the manuscript was at least 27 volumes long, with all volumes having eight pages except for the last one, which had possibly only six pages. In the early 1930s, a facsimile of it was published by Ejnar Munksgaard.
