= Laxárdalur =

Region in northwestern Iceland

Coordinates: 65°09′N 21°35′W

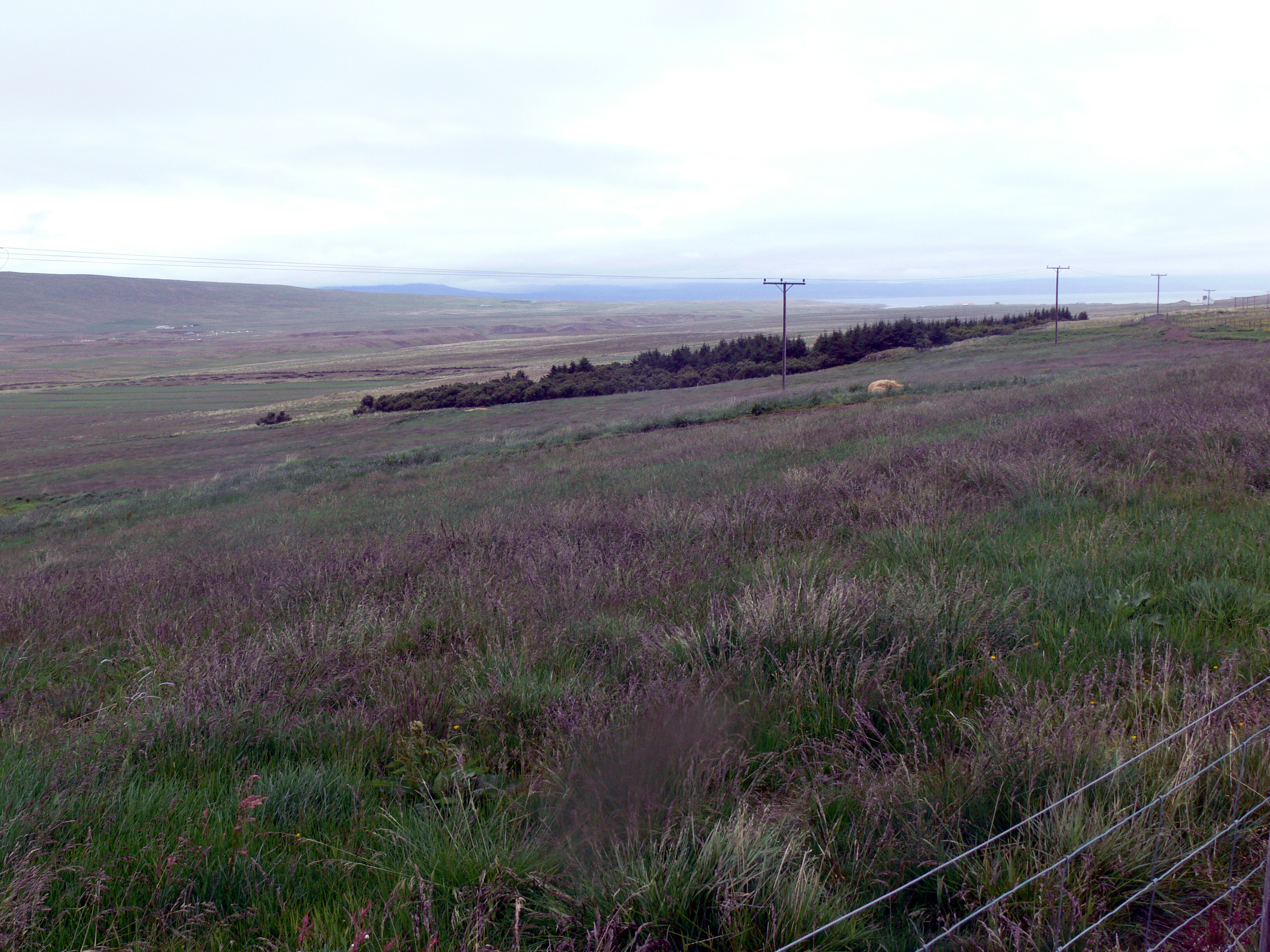
The lower reach of the valley, with Hvammsfjörður in the distance

Laxárdalur (Icelandic pronunciation: [ˈlaksˌaurˌtaːlʏr̥]) is a valley in Dalasýsla in northwestern Iceland, formed by the River Laxá. It was the home of the Laxdælir, a group of Icelanders whose doings are described in the Laxdæla saga.
