= Guðrún Ósvífrsdóttir =

Main protagonist of the Icelandic Laxdœla saga

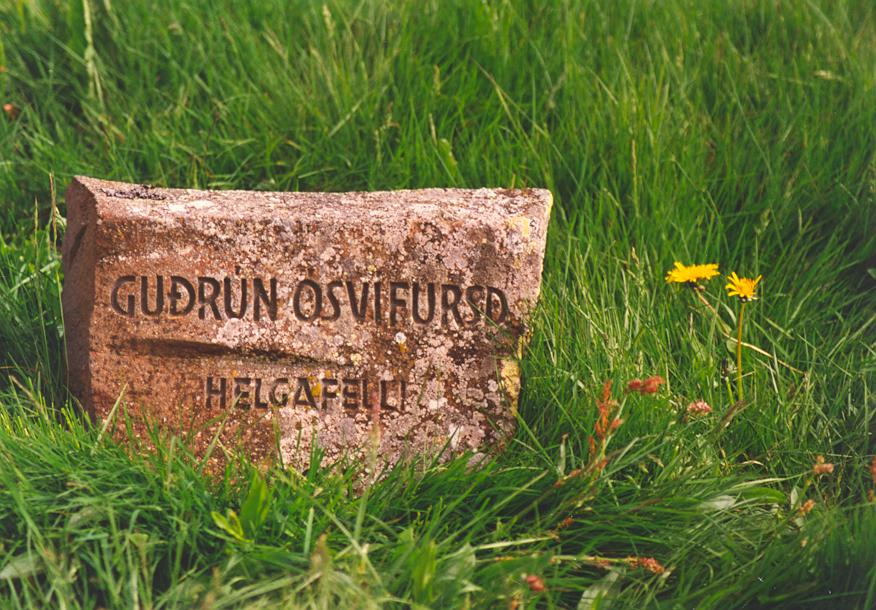
Commemorative stone for Guðrún at Helgafell on Snæfellsnes

Guðrún Ósvífrsdóttir (Old Norse: [ˈɡuðˌruːn ˈoːsˌwiːvz̠sˌdoːtːez̠]; Modern Icelandic: Guðrún Ósvífursdóttir [ˈkvʏðˌruːn ˈousˌviːvʏr̥sˌtouhtɪr̥]; 10th century – 11th century), was an Icelandic woman who was famed for her great wisdom and beauty. She was married four times. She is the main protagonist of the Medieval Icelandic Laxdæla saga, which recounts the history of the People of Laxárdalur. It is widely thought that the saga represents some historical fact.

== Background ==
Guðrún was the daughter of Ósvífr Helgason and Þórdís Þjóðólfsdóttir. She grew up at Laugar in Sælingsdal. Her future marriages were foretold when she relayed four dreams, each representing one of her marriages to come. There exists a thermal bath called Guðrúnarlaug reportedly at the site where the dreams were interpreted by Gestur Oddleifsson.

=== First marriage ===
Her first marriage to Thorvaldr Halldorsson ended in divorce. It was a brief unhappy marriage, however after the divorce she acquired half of his estate.

=== Second marriage ===
Her second husband Thord Ingunnarsson drowned at sea. She gave birth to his son soon after, naming him Thord.

=== Third marriage ===
After her second husband's death she was courted by the two foster-brothers Kjartan Óláfsson and Bolli Þorleiksson. Guðrún preferred Kjartan, but she gave herself to Bolli, because of a false rumour that Kjartan was engaged to Ingibjörg, the sister of King Óláfr Tryggvason. The two foster-brothers engaged in hostilities which ended with Bolli killing Kjartan, and Bolli being killed by Kjartan's kinsmen.

Her second son, Bolli Bollason, was born the winter after the killing of his father when her son Thord was only four. They grew up at Helgafell, after his mother Guðrún exchanged homes with chieftain Snorri Þorgrímsson (Snorri goði).

=== Fourth marriage ===
In 1020, Guðrún married for the fourth time, this time to Thorkell Eyjolffsson, who became a great chieftain in his own countryside and took over the running of the household at Helgafell. Thorkell was fond of both his stepsons, but Bolli was regarded as "being the foremost in all things". Thorleik journeyed abroad to Norway, and stayed with King Olaf Haraldsson for several months.

Guðrún constantly argued for revenge for the killing of her former husband Bolli Þorleiksson, but eventually her two sons made peace with the sons of Óláfr, Kjartan's kinsmen, at the Thorness Thing; it is not known how much money was exchanged in compensation as part of the agreement, but "both sides were thought to have gained in esteem from these affairs". To get Thorgils to help her have revenge she promised to marry no other man in the country, nor to marry abroad. When he returns successful she tells him that she is to marry Thorkel since he technically meets the requirements of their promise. He was not in the country at the time, and they would not be marrying abroad. Thorgils was not very happy about this turn of events. Her father, Ósvífr Helgason died soon after the marriage, and he was buried at a church Guðrún constructed.

=== Widowhood ===
The day Thorkell drowned at sea, Guðrún saw the ghost of him and his companions standing outside the church. They vanished but left a strong impression on her, she became the first Icelandic woman to learn the Psalter. Her granddaughter Herdis often accompanied her on her nightly prayer excursions. One night Herdis had a dream that led them to a discovery of a prophetess buried beneath Guðrún's prayer spot.

Her son Bolli asked permission to marry Thordis, the daughter of Snorri Goði. Guðrún approved of the union. In her old age Guðrún was asked by her son Bolli which of the men in her life she loved most. She gave the cryptic response "To him I was worst whom I loved most," which answer, though accepted by her son, has sparked great debate among scholars as to whom she was referring. There are strong implication in the story that she meant either Bolli or Kjartan but it will never be confirmed.

Guðrún died and was buried at Helgafell.

== Other sources ==
- Vidar Hreinsson (1997) The Complete Sagas of Icelanders (Reykjavik: Leifur Eiriksson Publishing Ltd.) ISBN 978-9979929307
