= Laxdæla saga =

Icelandic saga

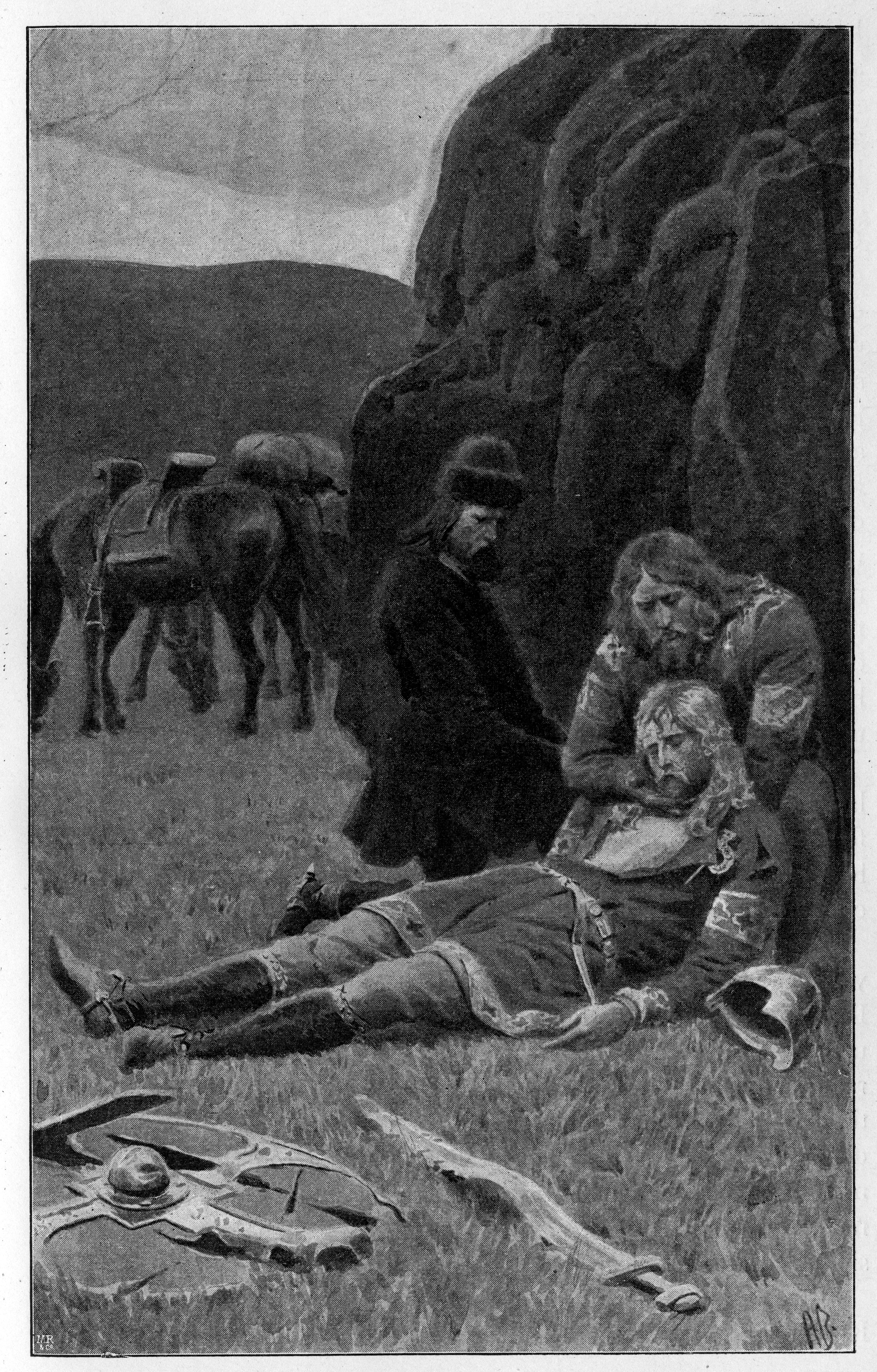
Kjartan Ólafsson is slain by his foster brother Bolli Þorleiksson. Bolli, filled with regret, holds the dying Kjartan in his arms.

Laxdæla saga (Note: Icelandic pronunciation: [ˈlaksˌtaiːla ˈsaːɣa]) (Note: Old Norse: Laxdœla saga [ˈlɑksˌdøːlɑ ˈsɑɣɑ]) or The Saga of the People of Laxárdalur is one of the sagas of Icelanders. Written in the 13th century, it describes events that took place among the Laxdælir (i.e. the people of Laxárdalur in western Iceland) between the 9th and 11th centuries. The saga particularly focuses on a love triangle between Guðrún Ósvífrsdóttir, Kjartan Óláfsson and Bolli Þorleiksson. Kjartan and Bolli grow up together as close friends, but the love they both have for Guðrún causes enmity between them.

Second only to Njáls saga in the number of medieval manuscripts preserved, Laxdæla saga remains popular and appreciated for its poetic beauty and pathos.

== Authorship and sources ==
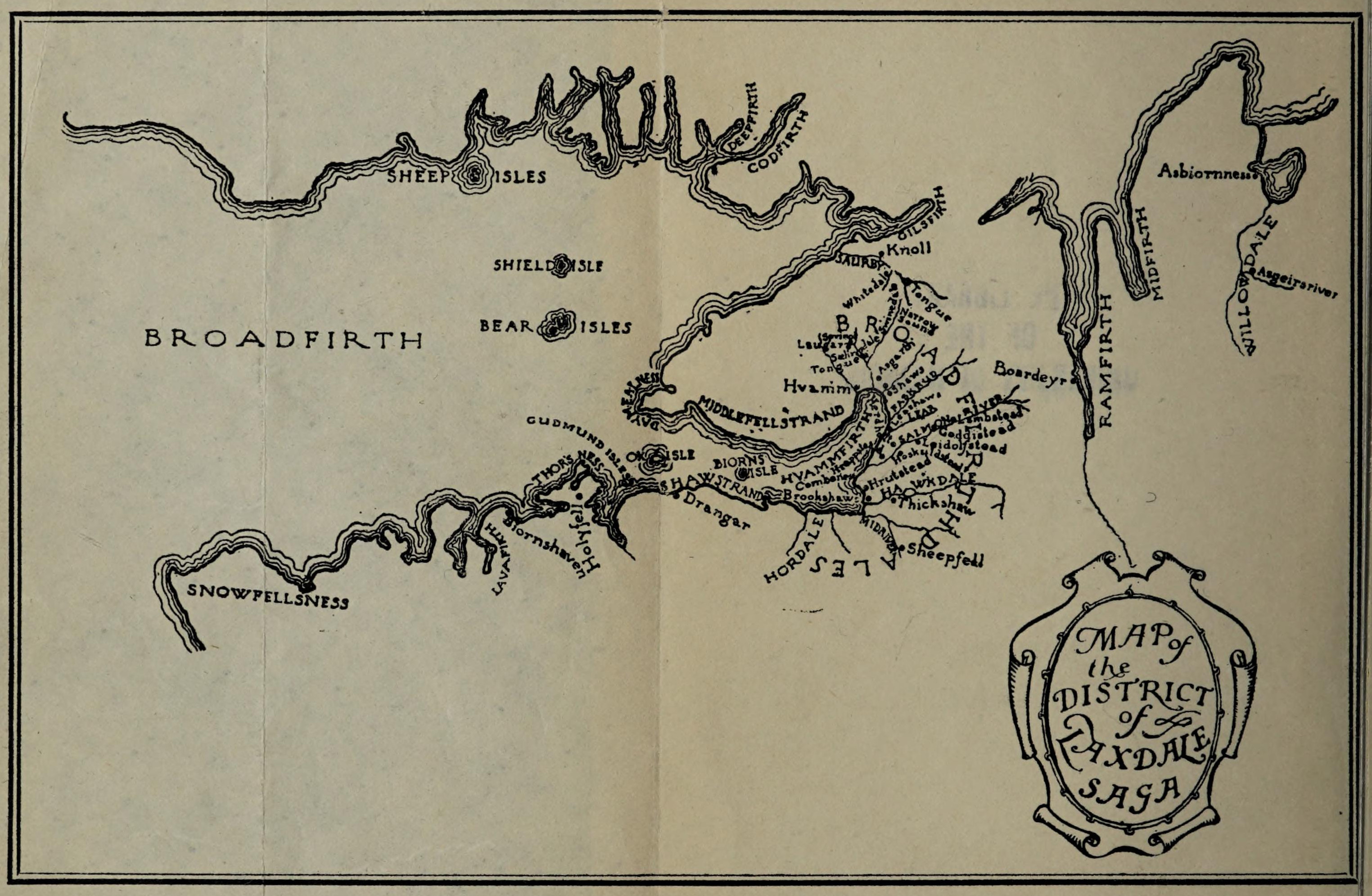
Map of the setting of the saga. Laxárdalur, the home of the Laxdælir, stretches eastward from Hvammsfjörður. (Note: The map anglicizes the names as "Salmon River (Dale)" and "Hvammfirth".)

As is the case with the other Icelanders' sagas, the author of Laxdæla saga is unknown. Since the saga has often been regarded as an unusually feminine saga, it has been speculated that it was composed by a woman. The author's extensive knowledge of locations and conditions in the Breiðafjörður area show that the author must have lived in western Iceland. Internal evidence shows that the saga must have been composed sometime in the period 1230–1260.

On several occasions, Laxdæla saga explicitly cites what appear to be written sources. It twice refers to the writings of Ari Þorgilsson, once to a lost Þorgils saga Höllusonar and once to a Njarðvíkinga saga, perhaps an alternative title for Gunnars þáttr Þiðrandabana. The author may also have been familiar with other written sources, but his or her main sources were probably oral traditions, which he or she shaped according to his or her taste.

== Preservation ==
Laxdæla saga is preserved in numerous manuscripts. The oldest manuscript to contain the saga in its entirety is Möðruvallabók dating to the mid-14th century. There are also five vellum fragments, the oldest dating to ca. 1250, and numerous young paper manuscripts, some of which are valuable for textual criticism of the saga.

Scholars have divided the manuscripts into two groups: the Y group, which includes Möðruvallabók; and the Z group, which includes the oldest fragment. The greatest divergence between the groups is that the Y group contains ten additional chapters. These chapters were not written by the original author and are regarded by scholars as a separate work, Bolla þáttr Bollasonar. Another difference is that the theft of Kjartan's sword is narrated in two different ways. Most other differences between the manuscripts are minor variations in wording.

== Synopsis ==
=== Prelude ===
Laxdæla saga begins in Norway in the late ninth century as Ketill Flatnose and his children leave Norway to escape the tyranny of Harald Fairhair. The saga focuses in particular on Ketill's daughter Unnr the Deep-Minded. Unnr leaves Norway to travel with her family to Iceland. Later in the saga when she hears that her father and her son are dead, she has a ship built so that she can take all of her surviving kinsmen as well as a great deal of wealth to safety. Unnr goes on to travel to Scotland and the Orkney and Faroe Islands before claiming lands in Breiðafjörður in western Iceland. Later in life, Unnr decides to leave her wealth to Olaf, the youngest of Thorstein's children. She decided to leave her inheritance to him because he was very good looking and likable. The saga describes Unnr's dignified death and her ship burial.

The next principal character is Hǫskuldr Dala-Kolsson, great-grandson of Unnr. He is married to a woman named Jorunn. He travels to Norway to acquire wood for house-building. While abroad, he purchases a mute but beautiful and expensive slave-girl. He also meets King Hákon the Good, who gives him wood, as well as a ring and a sword. Hǫskuldr then travels back to Iceland. Hǫskuldr and the slave-girl have a child named Olaf, later nicknamed Olaf the Peacock. One day, when Olaf is two years old, Hǫskuldr finds Olaf and his mother talking by a stream. Hǫskuldr tells the slave-girl that she can no longer pretend to be mute and asks for her name. She reveals that she is Melkorka, daughter of King Mýrkjartan of Ireland, and that she was taken captive at the age of fifteen. Hǫskuldr also fights the reanimated Hrappr.

Olaf the Peacock grows up to be a handsome and well-mannered man. When he is eighteen years old he travels abroad. He first goes to Norway where he pays his respects to King Harald Greycloak and befriends his mother, Gunnhildr. When Gunnhildr learns that Olaf wants to travel to Ireland to seek his grandfather, she orders a ship to be made ready for him and gives him a crew of sixty men. Olaf sails to Ireland but ends up with his ship stranded in an unfavorable area, far from any port. Local Irishmen lay claim to all property on the ship, according to Irish law on ship strandings. Olaf, who is fluent in Old Irish, refuses to give up the ship. The Irish attempt to take the ship by force but Olaf and his men successfully resist.

King Mýrkjartan happens to be nearby and arrives at the scene. Olaf tells the king that he is the son of Melkorka, his daughter, and offers him a gold ring from Melkorka as proof. Mýrkjartan had given his daughter the ring as a teething present. As the king examines the ring, his face grows red and he acknowledges Olaf as his kinsman. Olaf and his men spend the winter with the king, fighting with him against raiders. Mýrkjartan offers Olaf to inherit the crown but he rejects the offer and travels back home.

Olaf's journey abroad has brought him great renown and he now settles in Iceland. He marries Þorgerðr, daughter of Egill Skallagrímsson. Olaf and Þorgerðr have a number of children, including the promising Kjartan. As Hǫskuldr dies, he gives Olaf, his illegitimate son, the ring and sword which King Hákon had given him. Olaf's half-brother, Þorleikr, takes offence at this. In order to make peace with his brother, Olaf offers to foster Þorleikr's son, Bolli, "as he who raises the child of another is always considered as the lesser of the two".

=== Love triangle ===
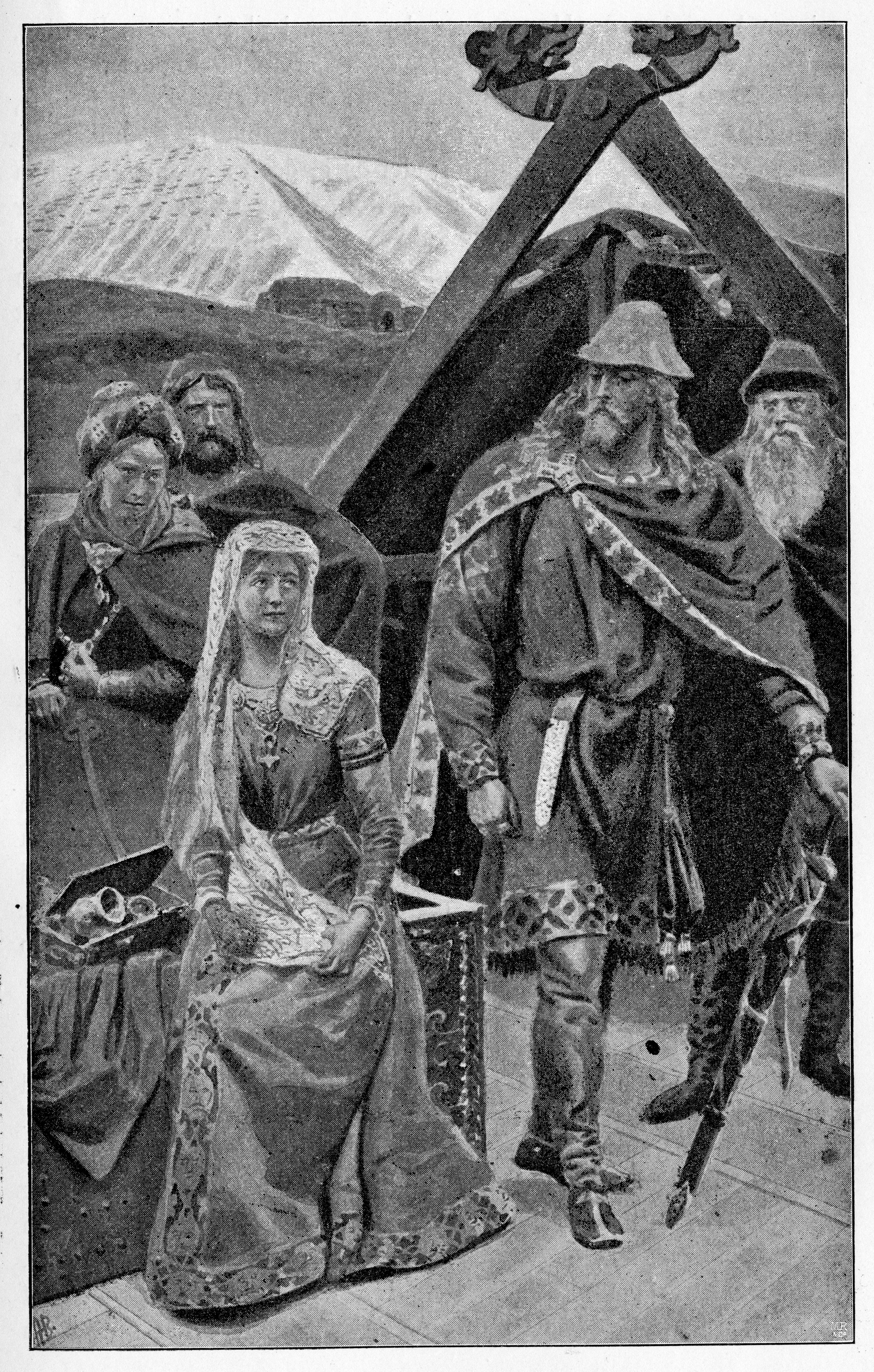
Kjartan sees Hrefna with the headdress and decides he might as well own "both together, the bonnet and the bonnie lass".

Guðrún Ósvífursdóttir is introduced as "the most beautiful woman ever to have grown up in Iceland, and no less clever than she was good-looking". Guðrún has dreams that cause her concern. A wise kinsman interprets the dreams to mean that Guðrún will have four husbands; she will divorce the first one, but the other three will die. And indeed, Guðrún marries her first husband (Þorvaldr Halldórsson) at the age of 15 and he turns out to be a man she cares little for. She makes him a shirt with a low-cut neck and then divorces him on the grounds that he wears women's clothes. Guðrún's second marriage (to Þórðr Ingunarsson) is happy but short; her husband drowns through the witchcraft of a Hebridean family, Kotkell, his wife Gríma, and their sons Hallbjörn slíkisteinsauga and Stígandi.

Kjartan and Bolli grow up together as close friends, the affection between them "such that both of them felt something was missing in the other's absence". Kjartan and Guðrún start spending time together and are considered a good match. Kjartan and Bolli decide to travel abroad. Guðrún is displeased by this and asks Kjartan to take her with him. Kjartan refuses, reminding Guðrún that she has responsibilities at home. He asks her to wait for him for three years. Guðrún refuses and they part in disagreement.

Kjartan and Bolli arrive in Norway at Nidaros and learn that there has been a change of rulers. The arch-pagan Earl Hákon has been killed and Olaf Tryggvason has ascended to the throne, eager to spread Christianity as widely as possible. A number of prominent Icelanders are docked at Nidaros, forbidden to put to sea because they refuse to adopt the new religion. Kjartan and Bolli resolve not to convert and Kjartan suggests burning down the king's quarters with the king inside. Eventually Kjartan warms to the king and relents and all the Icelanders at Nidaros are baptized.

King Olaf makes repeated attempts at converting Iceland to Christianity but meets with resistance. He decides to hold Kjartan and several other sons of prominent Icelanders as hostages in Norway to force a conversion. Bolli however, is allowed to go and sails home to Iceland. He tells Guðrún that Kjartan is held in high favor by King Olaf and she shouldn't expect him back in Iceland in the coming years. He also tells her, correctly, that Kjartan has become friendly with the king's sister, Ingibjörg. Bolli asks Guðrún's hand in marriage and although she is very reluctant the marriage eventually goes through.

News reaches Norway that Iceland has converted and King Olaf grants Kjartan leave. Kjartan visits Ingibjörg for the last time and she gives him an embroidered head-dress, saying that she hopes Guðrún Ósvífrsdóttir "will enjoy winding this about her head" and that Kjartan is to give it to her as a wedding present. When Kjartan arrives in Iceland he discovers that Guðrún is already married to Bolli. When Kjartan, by coincidence, finds a beautiful woman named Hrefna trying on the headdress he tells her, "I don't think it would be a bad idea if I owned both together, the bonnet and the bonnie lass". Kjartan gives Hrefna the headdress and marries her.

Bolli attempts to mend his relationship with Kjartan and offers him some fine horses as a gift. Kjartan flatly refuses and hard feelings remain. In a subsequent feast, Kjartan insists that Hrefna sit in the high-seat. Guðrún, used to having this honor, turns red. Later in the feast, Kjartan discovers that his sword has been stolen. It is discovered in a swamp without its scabbard and Guðrún's brother is suspected of the theft. Kjartan is deeply rankled by the event but his father, Olaf, persuades him that the matter is too trivial to quarrel about. At the next feast, Hrefna's headdress disappears. When Kjartan calls Bolli out on the matter, Guðrún tells him: "And even if it were true someone here was involved in the disappearance of the head-dress, in my opinion they've done nothing but take what rightfully belonged to them."

Kjartan is now no longer able to withstand the insults. He gathers some men together and goes to Bolli's farm, stationing guards at all the doors of the farmhouse. He prevents everyone from exiting for three days and so forces them to relieve themselves indoors. Later, he further humiliates Bolli and Guðrún by preventing the sale of some land which they had intended to buy.

=== Death and vengeance ===
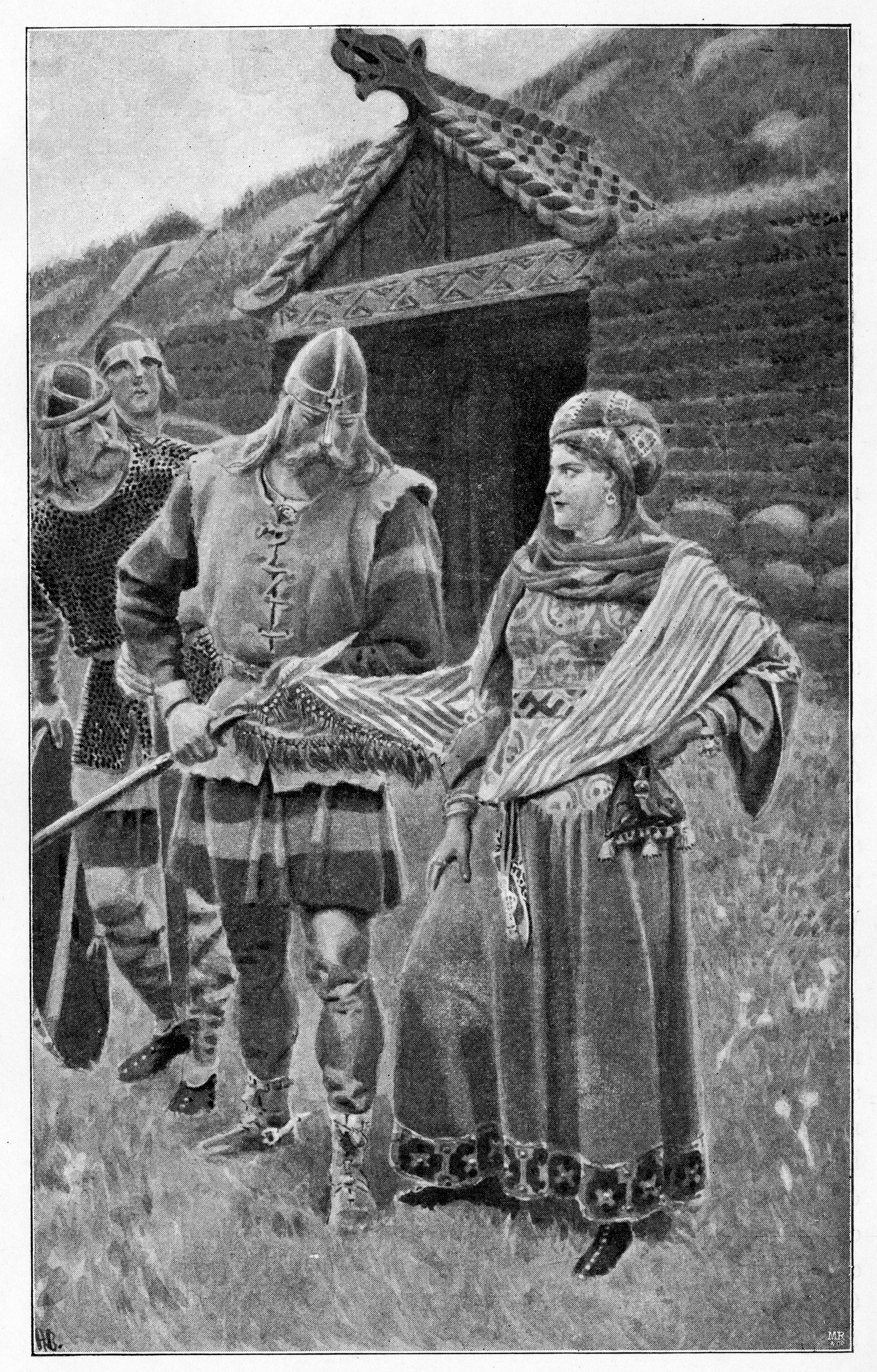
Guðrún smiles at Helgi Harðbeinsson, right after he killed her third husband Bolli.

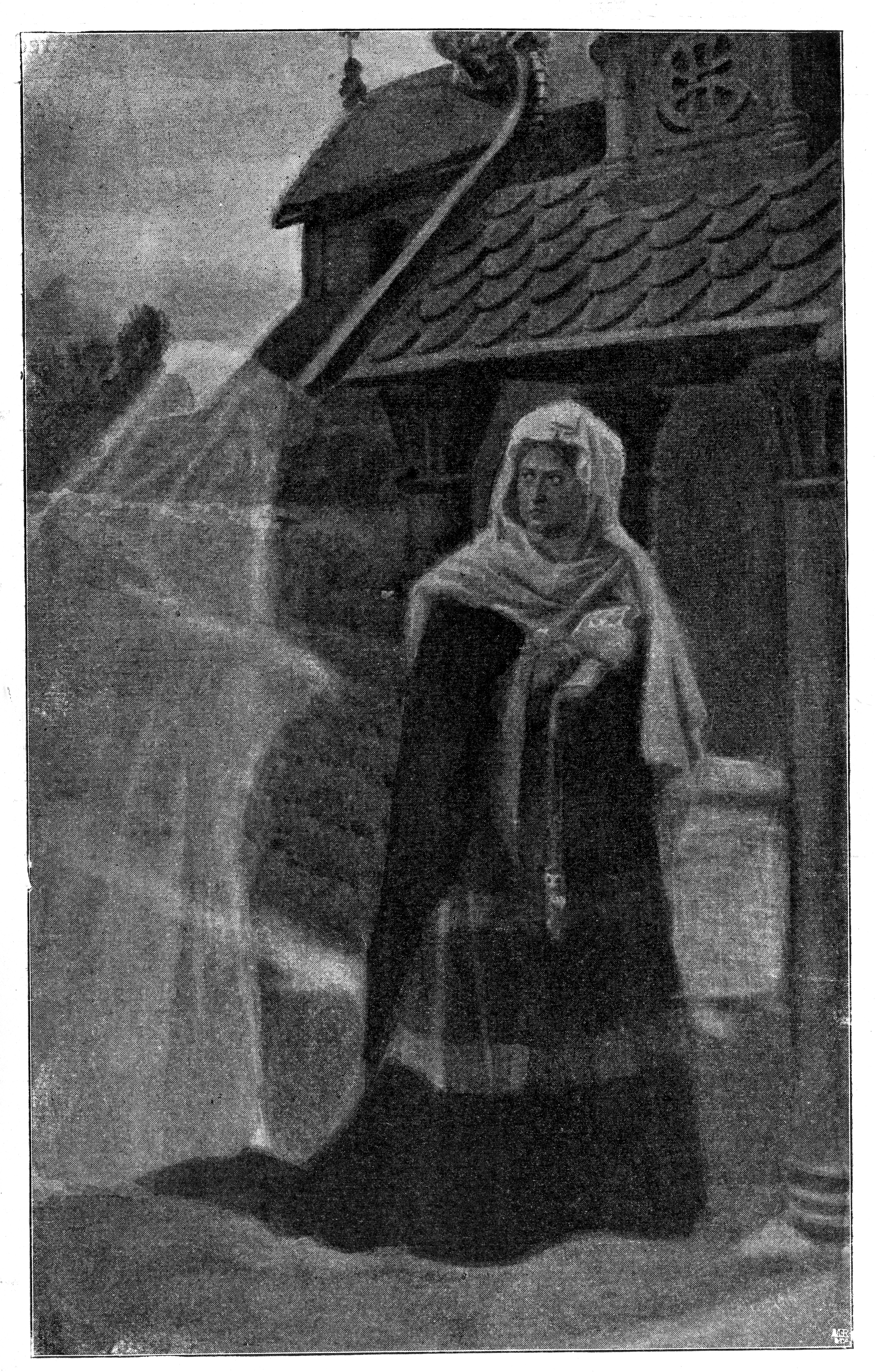
Guðrún encounters a ghost after her fourth and last husband Þorkell Eyjólfsson drowned at sea.

Guðrún goads her brothers into attacking Kjartan and they start laying plans to waylay him. Guðrún then asks Bolli to go along with them. Bolli refuses, reminding Guðrún that Olaf the Peacock had brought him up kindly and that Kjartan was his kinsman. Guðrún then tells him that she will divorce him if he does not go and he relents.

Guðrún's brothers find Kjartan with one companion and attack him while Bolli stands aside. Seeing that, despite superior numbers, they cannot overpower Kjartan, they urge Bolli to join them, pointing out that there will be dire consequences for all of them if Kjartan escapes. Bolli then draws his sword and turns toward Kjartan. Seeing that his kinsman is about to attack him, Kjartan throws away his weapon and Bolli deals him a death blow. Immediately filled with regret, Bolli holds Kjartan in his arms while he dies.

Kjartan's killers are prosecuted at the local assembly and Guðrún's brothers are exiled from Iceland. Out of affection for Bolli, Olaf the Peacock asks for him to pay a fine rather than be outlawed. Kjartan's brothers are outraged by their father's lenience and say that they will find it difficult to live in the same district as Bolli.

Olaf dies three years after Kjartan's death. His widow, Þorgerðr, then starts inciting her sons to avenge their brother. She reminds them of their great ancestors and says that their grandfather Egill would most certainly not have failed to avenge a man like Kjartan. Unable to resist their mother's taunts, the brothers start planning an attack. Riding out with a party of ten, including their mother, they find Bolli and Guðrún in a shieling. A man named Helgi Harðbeinsson deals Bolli a heavy blow with a spear and one of Kjartan's brothers then severs his head. Helgi wipes his spear clean on Guðrún's shawl and Guðrún smiles. Helgi remarks that his "own death lies under the end of that shawl".

Guðrún gives birth to a son and names him Bolli for his dead father. When Bolli is 12 years old, Guðrún shows him and his older brother the bloody garments their father was wearing when he was killed and her own bloody shawl. They start planning vengeance and some time later Bolli, wielding his father's sword, kills Helgi. Eventually the cycle of killing and vengeance peters out and Bolli and his brother make peace with Kjartan's brothers.

=== Aftermath ===
Bolli Bollason travels abroad and makes a good impression on King Olaf Haraldsson in Norway. He then travels to Constantinople where he gains renown as a member of the Varangian Guard. Guðrún marries for the fourth time but her husband drowns. In her old age she becomes a nun and an anchorite. The last chapter of the saga relates a conversation between Bolli and Guðrún. Bolli wants to know who his mother loved the most. Guðrún responds by listing her four husbands and their different qualities. Bolli says that this doesn't answer his question and presses his mother on the point. Finally Guðrún says, "To him I was worst whom I loved most."

== Other people mentioned in the saga ==
=== Geirmund the Noisy ===
Geirmund the Noisy (Old Norse: Geirmundr Gnýr; died c. 978) was an adventurer of the 10th century. Around 975, he hosted Olaf the Peacock during the latter's second expedition to Norway. On his return home to Iceland Olaf brought Geirmund with him and Geirmund fell in love with Olaf's daughter Thurid (Þuríðr Óláfsdóttir). Though Olaf was opposed to the match, Geirmund bribed Thorgerd to be his advocate, and Olaf relented. The marriage was an unhappy one, and after three years Geirmund decided to return home without leaving any money for the support of his ex-wife and daughter. Enraged, Thurid boarded his ship before he departed, stole his famous sword "Leg-Biter" (Old Norse: Fótbítr) and left their infant daughter Groa on the ship. Geirmund cursed the sword, and on his return to Norway he and all of his shipmates, including little Groa, were drowned.

=== Aud Breeches ===
Bróka-Auðr ("Aud Breeches") is the first wife of Þórðr Ingunarsson before he marries Guðrún. He and Guðrún conspire that he will divorce Auðr on the pretext that she wears men's breeches. When the divorce is announced, Auðr expresses satisfaction that she is now single, but later makes a night-time expedition to the home of Þórðr and Guðrún and strikes Þórðr with a sword.

== Characterization ==
Thorstein Veblen finds certain religious references in the story to be intrusive. He notes that Kjartan "comes to be depicted as a sanctimonious acolyte given to prayer, fasting and pious verbiage; instead of being a wilful spoiled child, vain and sulky, of a romantic temper and endowed with exceptional physical beauty, such as the run of the story proclaims him". Similarly, he finds it jarring that Guðrún, "a beautiful vixen, passionate, headstrong, self-seeking and mendacious, is dutifully crowned with the distinction of having been the first nun and anchorite in Iceland, having meritoriously carried penance and abnegation to the outer limit of endurance".

Ármann Jakobsson objects to interpretations that focus on Guðrún's good looks and glamour, and instead he draws attention to the emphasis that the saga places on her intellect. He points out that in the account of her dream interpretation when she is fourteen years old she carries on a lengthy conversation with a sage.

== Reception ==
Laxdæla saga appears to have been held in high regard in medieval Iceland, as evidenced by the number of extant manuscripts — only Njáls saga is preserved in a greater number of vellum fragments. The saga's reception in modern times has also been enthusiastic. Guðbrandur Vigfússon writes that "This, the second only in size of the Icelandic Sagas, is perhaps also the second in beauty. It is the most romantic of all, full of pathetic sentiment". Similarly, Thorstein Veblen writes that the saga is conventionally regarded as "a thing of poetic beauty and of high literary merit".

There are writings from the 17th and 18th centuries "inspired by the content and characters of Laxdæla saga". One 18th-century poet, Tyrfingur Finnsson, has been described as having "an extraordinarily good grasp of dróttkvætt poetics".

== Popular culture ==
Laxdæla saga has influenced popular culture in different ways across a variety of media. A number of modern novels draw inspiration from the saga's plot and/or characters. These include, for example, Torfhildur Hólm's Kjartan og Guðrún (1886), E. Dagobert Schoenfeld's Kjartan und Gudrun (1898), Naomi Mitchison's The Land the Ravens Found (1955), Dorothy James Roberts's Fire in the Ice (1961), Rosemary Sutcliff's Sword Song (1997), Donna Jo Napoli's Hush: An Irish Princess' Tale (2007), and Rachel Tsoumbakos's The Irish Viking Princess (2020) and The Peacock's Mother (2021). Vilborg Davíðsdóttir's Auður (2009), Vígrði (2012), Blóðug jörð (2017), and Undir Yggdrasil (2020) all draw inspiration from the saga too, and Þórunn Erlu-Valdimarsdóttir's Mörg eru ljónsins eyru (2010) adapts the saga's plot as a crime story set between 1995 and 2009.

There are also a number of poetic and dramatic works inspired by Laxdæla saga. Among the poetic works are William Morris's "The Lovers of Gudrun" from The Earthly Paradise (1868–1870), Símon Dalaskáld's Ríma af Kjartani Ólafsynni (1869), and Brynjólfur Jónsson's Guðrún Ósvífsdóttir, Söguljóð (1892). Dramatic works inspired by the saga include Adam G. Oehlenschlager's Kiartan og Gudrun (1848), Júlíana Jónsdóttir's Víg Kjartans Ólafssonar (1879), Newman Howard's Kiartan the Icelander: A Tragedy (1902), John Masefield's The Locked Chest (1917), and Frank Laurence Lucas's The Lovers of Gudrun: A Tragedy in Five Acts (1935).

== Editions and translations ==
The first edition of the saga appeared in Copenhagen in 1826, along with a Latin translation. An important critical edition by Kristian Kålund was published in 1891. The 1934 edition by Einar Ól. Sveinsson in the Íslenzk fornrit series is regarded as standard and usually used by translators. The saga has been translated into Latin, English, Norwegian Bokmål, Norwegian Nynorsk, Danish, Swedish, German, French, Italian, Spanish, Polish, Czech, Finnish, Faroese, Japanese and Russian.

There have been six complete English translations of the saga.

- Muriel Press, Laxdæla Saga (London: Temple Classics, 1899); http://www.sagadb.org/laxdaela_saga.en; https://www.gutenberg.org/ebooks/17803.
- Robert Proctor, The Story of the Laxdalers, 1903; http://www.sagadb.org/laxdaela_saga.en2.
- Thorstein Veblen, The Laxdæla Saga, 1925.
- Margaret Arent, The Laxdoela Saga, 1964.
- Magnus Magnusson and Hermann Pálsson, Laxdæla Saga, 1969.
- Keneva Kunz (trans.), The Saga of the People of Laxardal and Bolli Bollason's Tale. First published in The Complete Sagas of Icelanders, Including 49 Tales, ed. by Viðar Hreinsson et al. (Reykjavík: Leifur Eiríksson Publishing, 1997); repr. in The Sagas of Icelanders: A Selection [ed. by Viðar Hreinsson et al.] (London: Allen Lane, 2000), pp. 270–435; repr. as The Saga of the People of Laxardal and Bolli Bollason's Tale (London: Penguin: 2008).

== See also ==
- Guðrúnarlaug
