= Bolli Þorleiksson =

Character in the Laxdæla saga

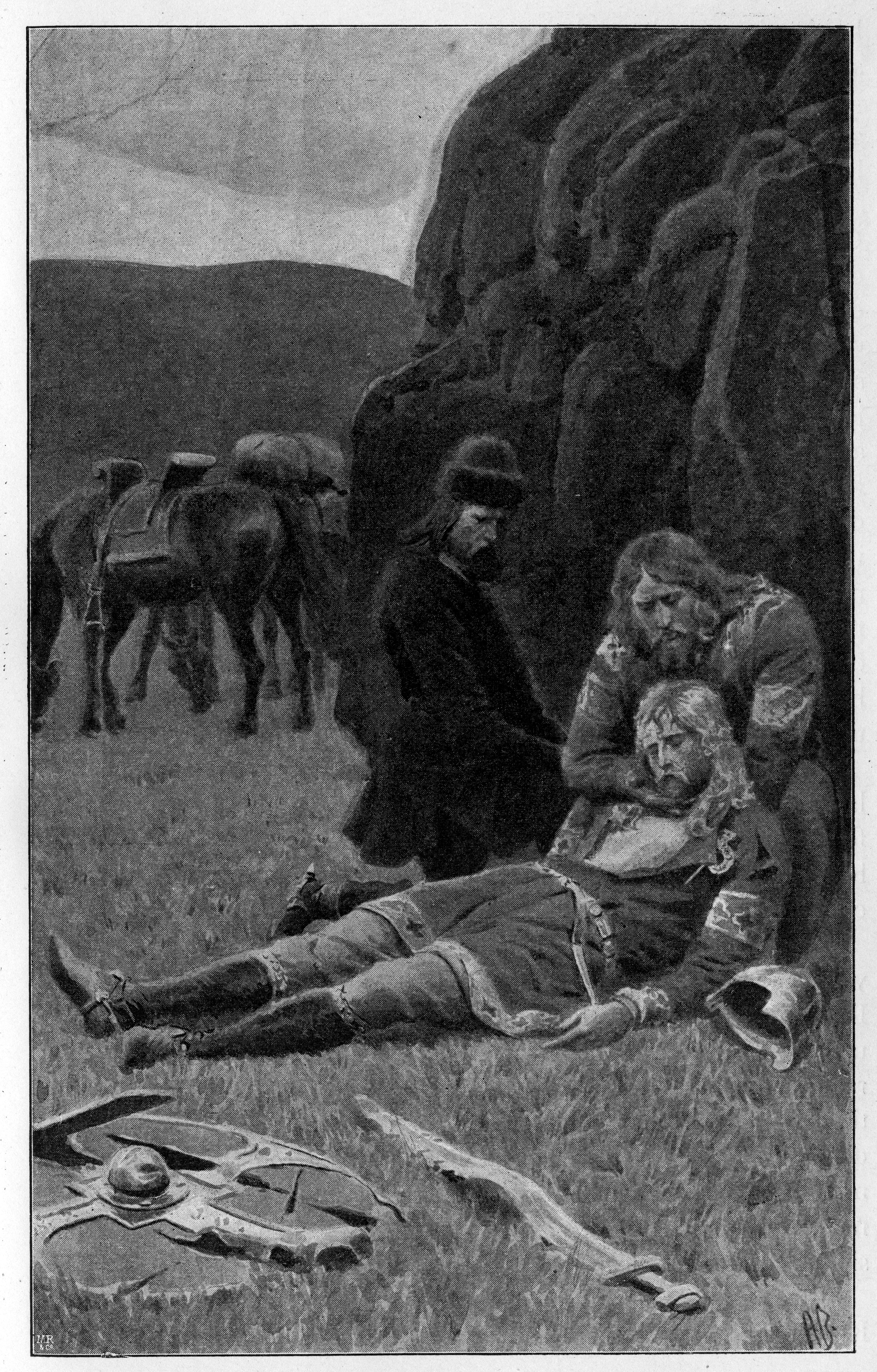
- Bolli Thorleiksson holds the dying Kjartan Ólafsson in his arms Illustration from "Vore fædres liv": 1898
- Born: 970
- Died: 1007 (age 37)
- Spouse: Guðrún Ósvífursdóttir
- Children: Bolli Bollason
- Father: Þorleikur Höskuldsson
- Family: Hvammverjar

Bolli Þorleiksson (also Bolli Thorleiksson; Old Norse: [ˈbolːe ˈθorˌlɛiksˌson]; Modern Icelandic: [ˈpɔtlɪ ˈθɔrˌleiksˌsɔːn]) was a key historical character in the Medieval Icelandic Laxdœla saga, which recounts the history of the People of Laxárdalur. He courted the famed Guðrún Ósvífursdóttir. Although Guðrún preferred his foster-brother Kjartan Ólafsson, she gave herself to Bolli because of a false rumour that Kjartan was engaged to Ingibjörg Tryggvadóttir, the sister of King Ólafur Tryggvason. Bolli engaged in hostilities with his foster-brother, which ended with him killing Kjartan, and then being killed in turn by Kjartan's kinsmen at the dairy.

== Death and aftermath ==
Bolli was well known for his skill and his swordsmanship. Prior to the attack, Thorstein the Black said "however underhanded he may be where he is, you may make up your mind for a brisk defence on his part, strong and skilled at arms as he is. He also has a sword that for a weapon is a trusty one." Bolli dealt one of his attackers a blow, which clove him through the head to the shoulder, killing him.

Then Lambi went in; he held his shield before him, and a drawn sword in his hand. In the nick of time Bolli pulled Footbiter out of the wound, whereat his shield veered aside so as to lay him open to attack. So Lambi made a thrust at him in the thigh, and a great wound that was. Bolli hewed in return, and struck Lambi's shoulder, and the sword flew down along the side of him, and he was rendered forthwith unfit to fight, and never after that time for the rest of his life was his arm any more use to him. At this brunt Helgi, the son of Hardbein, rushed in with a spear, the head of which was an ell long, and the shaft bound with iron. When Bolli saw that he cast away his sword, and took his shield in both hands, and went towards the dairy door to meet Helgi. Helgi thrust at Bolli with the spear right through the shield and through him. Now Bolli leaned up against the dairy wall, and the men rushed into the dairy, Halldor and his brothers, to wit, and Thorgerd went into the dairy as well. Bolli stood still against the dairy wall, and held tight to him his kirtle lest his inside should come out. Then Steinthor Olafson leapt at Bolli, and hewed at his neck with a large axe just above his shoulders, and forthwith his head flew off.

—

His second son, Bolli Bollasson, was born the winter after his killing, and his first son Thorleik was only four at the time. They grew up in Holyfell, after his mother Guðrún exchanged homes with the renowned Snorri the Goði. Guðrún constantly argued for revenge for his killing, but eventually his two sons made peace with the sons of Ólaf, Kjartan's kinsmen, at the Thorness Thing; it is not known how much money was exchanged in compensation as part of the agreement, but "both sides were thought to have gained in esteem from these affairs".
