= Njarðvík (farm) =

- Farm
- Location in Iceland
- Coordinates: 65°34′52″N 13°53′16″W
- Country: Iceland

Njarðvík (Icelandic pronunciation: [ˈnjarðˌviːk]) is an ancient farm in northeast Iceland. The descendants of its settlers are featured in several of the Sagas of Icelanders.

== History ==
=== Viking Age ===
The history of Njarðvík can be traced back to the settlement of Iceland, when Thorkel the Wise claimed all the land around the bay of Njarðvík. His great-grandson Ketil Thrym lived at Njarðvík and became a chieftain after his father, Thidrandi the Old. Several other notable 10th- and 11th-century Icelanders were related to this family, who are known as the "House of Njarðvík" (Old Norse Njarðvíkingar). The Saga of the People of Laxardal cites a lost "Saga of the House of Njarðvík," which may refer to a medieval text that no longer exists or else was renamed, or to an oral tradition.

== Sagas ==
Njarðvík is referenced in the following medieval Icelandic texts:

- The Book of Settlements
- The Short Saga of Gunnar, Thidrandi's Killer
- The Saga of Droplaug's Sons
- The Saga of the People of Fljotsdal
- The Saga of the People of Laxardal
