= Coastal migration (Americas) =

Hypothesis about first human settlement of the Americas

Coastal migration route shown next to its main competitor, the "Ice-free corridor" migration route

The coastal migration hypothesis is one of two leading hypotheses about the settlement of the Americas at the time of the Last Glacial Maximum. It proposes one or more migration routes involving watercraft, via the Kurile island chain, along the coast of Beringia and the archipelagos off the Alaskan-British Columbian coast, continuing down the coast to Central and South America.

The alternative is the hypothesis solely by interior routes, which assumes migration along an ice-free corridor between the Laurentide and Cordilleran ice sheets during the Last Glacial Maximum.

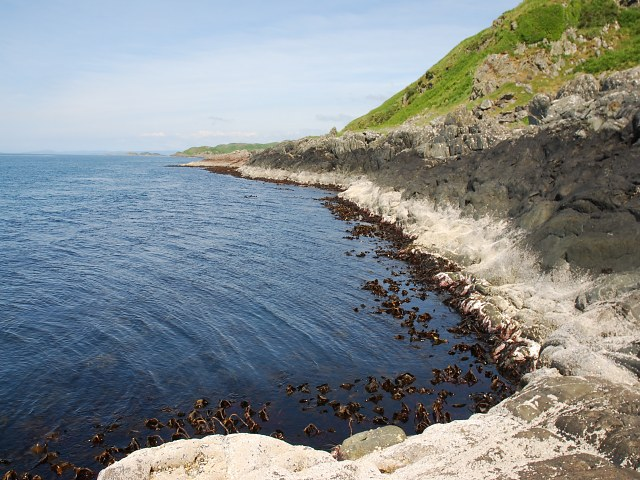
Kelp beds may have been prevalent along the coastlines of the northern Pacific Rim during the time of the Last Glacial Maximum, hosting wide variety of life to support a coastal migrating community of hunter-gatherers. Increasing evidence for the existence of a "kelp highway" has provided an alternative to purely interior routes in favor of more viable coastal migration.

The coastal migration hypothesis has been bolstered by findings such as the report that the sediments in the Port Eliza caves on Vancouver Island indicate the possibility of a survivable climate as far back 16 ka (16,000 years) in the area, while the continental ice sheets were nearing their maximum extent. Despite such research, the hypothesis is still subject to considerable debate.

Carlson, Erlandson, and others have argued for a coastal migration from Alaska to the Pacific Northwest pre-11ka (before ≈13,000 calendar years ago) that predates the hypothesized migration of Clovis people moving south through an ice-free corridor located near the continental divide. The coastal migrants may have been followed by the Clovis culture when the final retreat of the Cordilleran Ice Sheet opened migration routes between interior and coastal Alaska.

A 2017 discovery on Triquet Island by an archaeological team from the University of Victoria appears to verify local First Nation oral history traditions that the island was inhabited during the ice age. A hearth excavated at the site was determined by radiocarbon dating to be between 13,613 and 14,086 years old, making it one of the oldest settlements in North America.

While some archaeologists believe that the Clovis people moved south from Alaska through an ice-free corridor located between modern British Columbia and Alberta, recent dating of Clovis and similar Paleoindian sites in Alaska suggest that Clovis technology actually moved from the south into Alaska following the melting of the continental ice sheets at about 10.5 ka.

In North America, the earliest dog remains were found in Lawyer's Cave on the Alaskan mainland east of Wrangell Island in the Alexander Archipelago of southeast Alaska; radiocarbon dating indicates it is 10,150 years old. A genetic-based estimate indicates that this dog's lineage had split from the Siberian Zhokhov Island dog lineage 16,700 years ago. This timing coincides with the suggested opening of the North Pacific coastal route into North America.

== Sea levels ==
Dating the initial coastal migration is challenging because of the flooding of early settlement sites by the rise of the eustatic sea level accompanying deglaciation. Dates for sites such as ones at Ground Hog Bay in SE Alaska (10.2 ka) and Namu, about 800 km south of Ground Hog Bay near modern Bella Coola (9.7 ka) thus represent early mainland settlement above the present-day sea level after earlier waterborne migration while the sea level was lower and the coastal mainland was still glaciated. Full understanding of the initial migration requires careful reconstruction of the land and ecological resources available to the migrants in their contemporary environment.

Evidence from Southeast Alaska and Haida Gwaii (Queen Charlotte Islands) in British Columbia, provides some data about food and land resources during early settlement. Fedje and Christensen (1999:642) have identified several sites on Haida Gwaii that date to post 9ka. The oldest human yet found on the west coast of North America are from On Your Knees Cave, which is on Prince of Wales Island in Southeast Alaska. The individual, a young man in his early twenties when he died, has been dated to ≈10,000 cal BP and isotopic analyses indicate he was raised on a diet primarily of marine foods.

These data suggest human occupation when the sea level was lower than present, and that submerged archaeological sites could occur along the paleocoastline beyond the current shorelines of Haida Gwaii (Fedje & Christensen, 1999) and Southeast Alaska.

Between 13 and 10.5 ka, Haida Gwaii had more than double its current land area (Fedje & Christensen, 1999:638). This area was flooded with a rapid rise in sea level between 11 and 9 ka. (Fedje & Christensen, 1999:638). Therefore, evidence of initial human occupation on the paleocoastline of Haida Gwaii would now be below sea level. Conversely, older sites that are located near modern shorelines would have been approximately 24 km (15 mi) from the coast (Fedje & Christensen, 1999:638).

The antiquity of the lithic scatters that Fedje and Christensen (1999) have found in intertidal zones along the Haida Gwaii coast suggests an early human occupation of the area.

Fedje and Christensen (1999) support Carlson (1990), and Fladmark's (1975, 1979 & 1989) initial coastal migration model rather than the ice-free corridor model through their investigations of intertidal zones on Haida Gwaii.

== The peopling of the Americas ==
The timing and route of human arrival to mid-latitude North America is highly contested and both the terrestrial and coastal routes suffer from a paucity of archaeological evidence. Beringia is very difficult to access in modern-day because it is now below current sea level. However, hypotheses have been made based on mitochondrial DNA research to address the question of whether or not humans left Beringia and settled mid-latitude America during the LGM or stayed in Beringia throughout the LGM.

=== Three-wave model ===
The Three-wave model is an older model that attempts to explain the peopling of the Americas suggested by Greenberg et al. (1986). Using linguistic and genetic data as well as dental anthropology, Greenberg et al. subdivided Native Americans into three groups: Amerind, Na-Dene, and Aleut-Inuit. They explained the linguistic, anatomical, and genetic differences they found in each group as a result of separate migrations or waves out of Northeast Asia to the Americas.

This model has been criticized by anthropologist Emőke J.E. Szathmáry who thought that Greenberg's study overstated biological difference. Szathmáry argued that the differences between each group could be better explained by isolation rather than the three migrations. In 1977, Bonatto and Szathámry (1997) concluded that the presence of glaciers isolated the populations from one another, causing them to settle in Beringia rather than use it as a bridge or corridor for migration to mid-latitude America. Bonatto and Szathmáry suggest that after the LGM, humans actually migrated out of Beringia rather than out of Asia.

=== Beringian "Standstill" hypothesis ===
The Beringian "Standstill" Hypothesis proposed by Tamm et al. (2007) builds on Bonatto and Szathmáry's idea of migration out of Beringia after the LGM. Using mitochondrial DNA (mDNA) and computer modeling of ice sheets, Tamm et al. estimate an isolation period in Beringia of about ≈10,000 years, concluding that the isolated Beringian populations spread throughout mid-latitude and South America after the LGM due to blocked access to North America before 15,000 cal BP.

At the turn of the 21st century, more research began to favor the coastal migration theory over terrestrial theories for the peopling of the Americas. Paleoecological evidence suggests that travel along the coast would have been possible between 13 and 11 ka as the ice sheets were retreating. The coastal region was quite hospitable by 13 ka to peoples with watercraft and a maritime adaptation.

=== Kelp highway hypothesis ===
This hypothesis addresses how humans could have settled the Americas before the ice sheets retreated, allowing for terrestrial migration. Erlandson et al. (2007) suggest that coastal migrations and settlements happened in higher latitudes, such as 35-70°N, where coastal ecosystems would be more productive because of geography and upwelling in the Northern Pacific Rim. The different kelps of the Pacific Rim are major contributors to the areas of productivity and biodiversity and support a wide variety of life such as marine mammals, shellfish, fish, seabirds, and edible seaweeds that would also support a coastal community of hunter-gatherers.

While the benefits of kelp forests are very clear in the present day Pacific Rim, Erlandson et al. address the difficulties of understanding the ancient kelp forests as they would have existed at the end of the LGM. But, they were able to estimate where the kelp forests might have been distributed.

==== Archeological and geological evidence ====
Archaeological sites from the Pacific Northwest to Baja California have offered more evidence to suggest the coastal migration theory. Sites in the North Pacific have been discovered and researched to help develop a baseline of early coastal colonization data. In California, archeological sites with dates that support human settlement in the migration period 12,000 -7,000 ybp are: Borax Lake, the Cross Creek Site, Santa Barbara Channel Islands, Santa Barbara Coast's Sudden Flats, and the Scotts Valley site, CA-SCR-177. The Arlington Springs Man is an excavation of 10,000-year-old human remains in the Channel Islands. Marine shellfish remains associated with kelp forests were recovered in the Channel Island sites and at other sites such as Daisy Cave and Cardwell Bluffs dated between 12,000 and 9000 cal BP.

In South America, evidence of human presence as early as 12,500 cal BP was discovered at the Monte Verde site pointing to coastal migration south over inland migration as the ice sheet would not yet be retreated. This evidence is questioned by a March 2026 study that claims the site could not be older than 8,200 cal BP.

Further evidence to support the coastal migration hypothesis has been found in the biological viability of regions after deglaciation. Lesnek et al. 2018 found that the deglaciation of the Pacific coastal corridor allowed for biological productivity, availability of food resources, and an accessible migration route for early colonization.

==== Zoo-archaeological evidence ====
Further evidence of a coastal ecology sufficient to support early coastal migrants comes from zoo-archaeological finds along the Northwest coast. Goat remains as old as 12 ka have been found on Vancouver Island, British Columbia, as well as bear remains dating to 12.5 ka in the Prince of Wales Archipelago, British Columbia. Even older remains of black and brown bear, caribou, sea birds, fish, and ringed seal have been dated from a number of caves in Southeast Alaska by paleontologist Timothy Heaton. This means that there were enough land and floral resources to support large land mammals and, theoretically, humans.

=== Watercraft ===
Fedje and Christensen (1999:648) also argue that the coast was likely colonized before 13 ka, largely based on watercraft evidence from Japan before 13 ka. Dietary evidence from middens in Indonesia indicates the development of offshore fishing, requiring watercraft, between 35 and 40 ka. Sea-going cultures were mobile in the island-rich environment off the late Pleistocene coast of east Asia, facilitating the spread of marine technology and skills through the Philippines, up the Ryukyu chain, to Japan. Warming of the climate after about 16 ka (although glaciation would remain) could have provided an impetus for seaborne migration up the Kurile island chain towards North America, through some combination of a more hospitable climate and increased ocean productivity. Although no boats have been recovered from early Pacific Coast archaeological sites, this may be due to poor preservation of organic materials and the inundation of coastal areas mentioned above. We can still infer water travel based on the presence of artifacts made by humans found at island sites.

Anecdotal evidence comes from the surviving Bella Bella oral tradition, as recorded by Franz Boas in 1898. "In the beginning there was nothing but water and ice and a narrow strip of shoreline." Some believe this story describes the environment of the Northwest Coast during the last deglaciation.

=== Migration south ===
Further south, California's Channel Islands have also produced evidence for early seafaring by Paleoindian (or Paleocoastal) peoples. Santa Rosa and San Miguel islands, for instance, have produced 11 sites dating to the Terminal Pleistocene, including the Arlington Man site dated to ≈11 ka and Daisy Cave occupied about 10.7 ka.

Significantly, the Channel Islands were not connected to the mainland coast during the Quaternary, so maritime peoples contemporary with the Clovis and Folsom complexes in the interior had to have seaworthy boats to colonize them. The Channel Islands have also produced the earliest fishhooks yet found in the Americas, bone bipoints (gorges) that date between about 8.5 and 9 ka (10,000 and 9500 calendar years).

Even further south, the Monte Verde site in Chile has become accepted as the earliest settlement in South America, dating to at least 14,500 years ago. This is believed to indicate migration through northern coastal regions before that date. The Monte Verde site produced the remains of nine types of seaweeds, including kelp.

== Western Stemmed Tradition ==
Paleocoastal Channel Islands settlers were equipped with finely made stemmed points, as well as chipped stone crescents generally similar to those found in Western Stemmed Tradition (WST) sites of western North America.

Such ancient stemmed point lithic technology is widely attested at many sites in North America. For example, at Buttermilk Creek, Texas (Debra L. Friedkin site) these artifacts are dated to ≈13.5 to ≈15.5 ka ago. At the nearby Gault site, stemmed projectile points dated to ≈16 ka ago are also found; they are located below a Clovis stratigraphic horizon at this site.

At Paisley Caves, Oregon, these WST projectile points are dated to ≈12.7 to ≈13 ka ago—soon after the earliest occupation level here. At Cooper's Ferry, Idaho, similar WST dates are reported.

At Meadowcroft Rockshelter, Pennsylvania, the Miller point (similar to WST) can be dated to ≈14 ka ago.

In Mexico, a stemmed projectile point is associated with the bones of a mammoth buried at Santa Isabel Iztapan (Ixtapan). Four hundred meters away, two other stemmed points were associated with butchered mammoth bones. The dates are similar to the above.

In South America, there is also a long history of the use of stemmed points. Here they are known as 'El Jobo points', from which later developed 'Stemmed Fishtail points'. In particular, El Jobo points are found at Monte Verde, Chile in use as early as ≈14.2 ka ago. El Jobo and Fishtail points became widespread across South America ≈13 ka ago.

On the Channel Islands, Jon Erlandson and his colleagues have identified several early shell middens located near sources of chert, which was used to make stone tools. These quarry/workshop sites have been dated between about 10 and 10.5 ka and contain crescents and finely made stemmed projectile points probably used to hunt birds and sea mammals, respectively.

== See also ==
- Settlement of the Americas § Pacific coastal route
- Huaca Prieta
- Solutrean hypothesis

== Literature ==
- Dillehay, Tom D.; Steve Goodbred; Mario Pino; Víctor F. Vásquez Sánchez; Teresa Rosales Tham; James Adovasio; Michael B. Collins; Patricia J. Netherly; Christine A. Hastorf; Katherine L. Chiou; Dolores Piperno; Isabel Rey; Nancy Velchoff (24 May 2017). "Simple technologies and diverse food strategies of the Late Pleistocene and Early Holocene at Huaca Prieta, Coastal Peru". Science Advances. 3 (5) e1602778. American Academy for the Advancement of Science. Bibcode:2017SciA....3E2778D. doi:10.1126/sciadv.1602778. PMC 5443642. PMID 28560337.
- Fedje, Daryl W.; Christensen, Tina (Oct 1999). "Modeling Paleoshorelines and Locating Early Holocene Coastal Sites in Haida Gwaii". American Antiquity. 64 (4): 635–652. doi:10.2307/2694209. JSTOR 2694209.
- Hardy, Karen; Erlandson, Jon M.; Braje, Todd J.; Ainis, Amira F.; Culleton, Brendan J.; Gill, Kristina M.; Hofman, Courtney A.; Kennett, Douglas J.; Reeder-Myers, Leslie A.; Rick, Torben C. (2020). "Maritime Paleoindian technology, subsistence, and ecology at an ≈11,700 year old Paleocoastal site on California's Northern Channel Islands, USA". PLOS ONE. 15 (9) e0238866. Bibcode:2020PLoSO..1538866E. doi:10.1371/journal.pone.0238866. ISSN 1932-6203. PMC 7498104. PMID 32941444.
- Waters, Michael R.; Keene, Joshua L.; Forman, Steven L.; Prewitt, Elton R.; Carlson, David L.; Wiederhold, James E. (2018). "Pre-Clovis projectile points at the Debra L. Friedkin site, Texas—Implications for the Late Pleistocene peopling of the Americas". Science Advances. 4 (10) eaat4505. Bibcode:2018SciA....4.4505W. doi:10.1126/sciadv.aat4505. ISSN 2375-2548. PMC 6200361. PMID 30397643.
