= Valla-Ljóts saga =

Icelandic saga

Valla-Ljóts saga is one of the sagas of Icelanders dating from the 13th century.

The saga tells of events in Svarfaðardalur during and after the introduction of Christianity. The saga can be seen as a continuation of Svarfdœla saga which is set in the same vicinity. The saga centers on chieftains Ljót Ljótólfsson from Völlum in Svarfaðardalur and his opponent Gudmund Eyjólfsson the mighty (Guðmundr inn ríki Eyjólfsson).

== See also ==
- Ljósvetninga saga

== Edition ==
- Peter A. Jorgensen (Ed.): Valla-Ljóts Saga. Bilingual Edition (Icelandic/English) of MS AM 161 fol. Saarbrücken, AQ-Verlag 1991. ISBN 978-3-922441-59-5.
