= Gunnars þáttr Þiðrandabana =

Norse saga

Gunnars þáttr Þiðrandabana (The Short Saga of Gunnar, Thidrandi's Killer) is a short saga (or þáttr) written in Old Norse in medieval Iceland. The events of the story take place in the Viking Age and concern Gunnar, a Norwegian merchant, who avenges his host's death in Iceland's Eastern Region, and must elude his enemies until he can safely escape the country.

== Classification ==
The Short Saga of Gunnar, Thidrandi's Killer has traditionally been classified as a þáttr (a short saga in English, but often translated as a tale) based on the short length of the text. The story, however, identifies itself as a saga with the concluding line "Here ends The Saga of Gunnar, Thidrandi's Killer. For this reason, some scholars prefer to group it with the Sagas of Icelanders instead.

== Content ==
The conflict in this story begins with an irresponsible farmhand named Asbjorn Cliff, who defaults on his debts and flees his creditors. He takes shelter with Ketil Thrym of Njardvik. His creditors come to Njardvik with Ketil Thrym's foster-son, Thidrandi, and attack Asbjorn. In the fight, Asbjorn is killed and Ketil Thrym avenges his death. Ketil Thrym is then killed in turn. Gunnar, a Norwegian merchant who was staying as a guest in Njardvik is brought into the fight. He avenges Ketil's death by killing Thidrandi, and this ends the fight. He is thereafter known as "Thidrandi's Killer" (Old Norse Þiðrandabani).

Gunnar is later pursued by Thidrandi's kinsmen who seek vengeance. Gunnar hides out with the help of various protectors and eventually escapes back to Norway.

== Other sagas ==
The events of this story are told in the following other medieval texts:

- The Saga of the People of Fljotsdal
- The Saga of the People of Laxardal
