= Hrafnkels saga =

Literary work

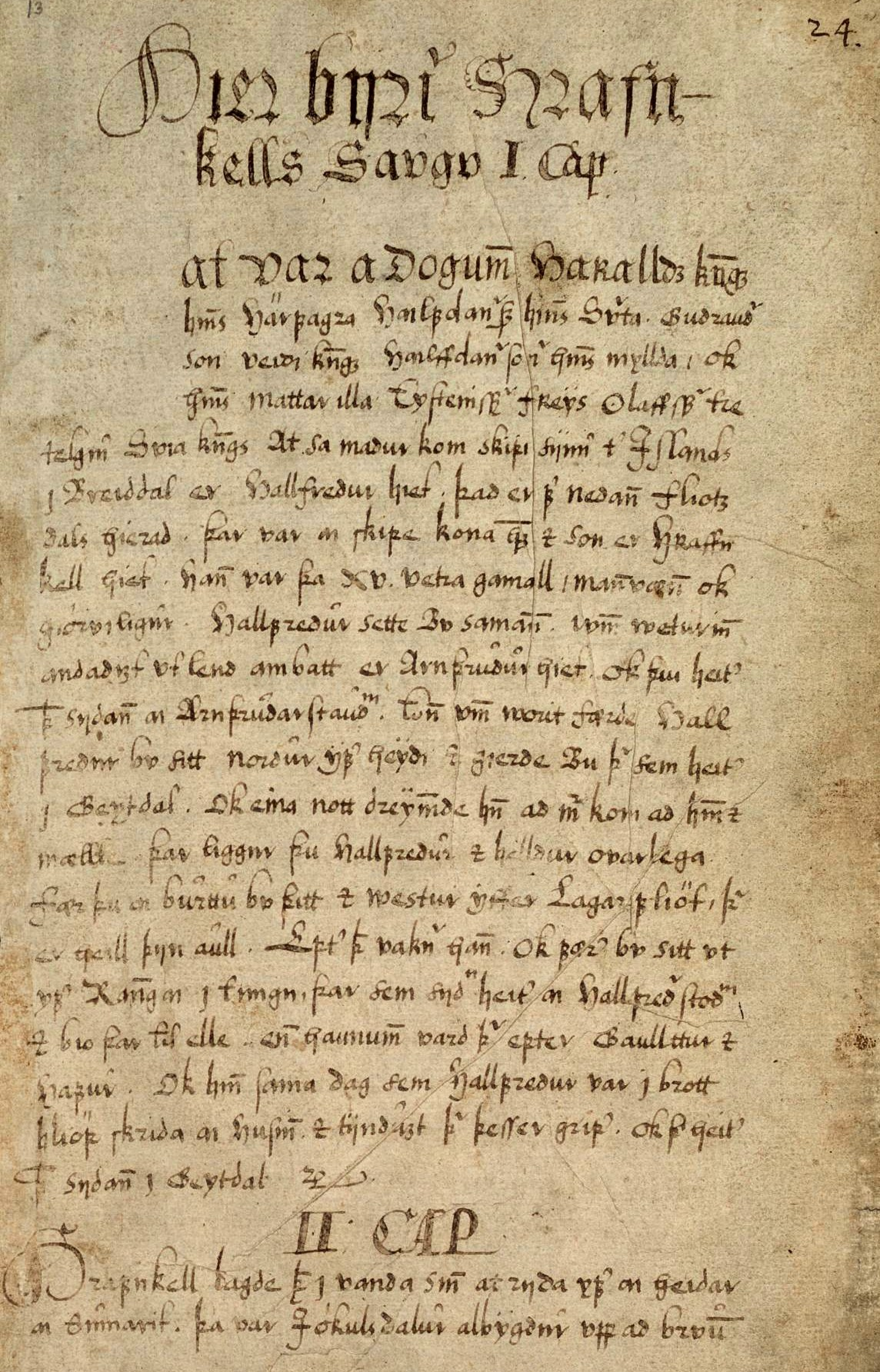
The first page of Hrafnkelssaga from the Árni Magnússon Institute for Icelandic Studies ÁM. 156, fol. — one of the saga's most important manuscripts, dating from the 17th century.

Hrafnkels saga (Old Norse pronunciation: [ˈhrɑvnˌkels ˌsɑɣɑ]; Icelandic pronunciation: [ˈr̥apn̥ˌcɛls ˌsaːɣa]) or Hrafnkels saga Freysgoða (O.N.: [ˈfrœysˌɡoðɑ]; Ice.: [ˈfreisˌkɔːða]) is one of the Icelanders' sagas. It tells of struggles between chieftains and farmers in the east of Iceland in the 10th century. The eponymous main character, Hrafnkell, starts out his career as a fearsome duelist and a dedicated worshiper of the god Freyr. After suffering defeat, humiliation, and the destruction of his temple, he becomes an atheist. His character changes and he becomes more peaceful in dealing with others. After gradually rebuilding his power base for several years, he achieves revenge against his enemies and lives out the rest of his life as a powerful and respected chieftain. The saga has been interpreted as the story of a man who arrives at the conclusion that the true basis of power does not lie in the favor of the gods but in the loyalty of one's subordinates.

The saga remains widely read today and is appreciated for its logical structure, plausibility, and vivid characters. For these reasons, it has served as a test case in the dispute on the origins of the Icelandic sagas.

== Synopsis ==
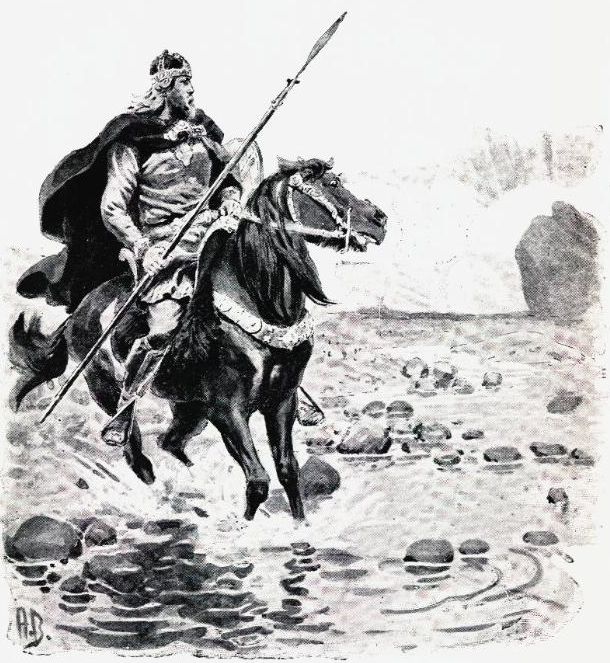
Hrafnkell as depicted in an 1898 illustration by Andreas Bloch.

We learn of the Norwegian man Hallfreður who becomes one of the original settlers of Iceland, arriving on the east coast around the year 900 with his fifteen-year-old son Hrafnkell, a promising young man. Hrafnkell has ambition and soon – with the permission of his father – establishes his own settlement. He selects an uninhabited valley for his farm and names it Aðalból (Noble home). The valley subsequently receives the name Hrafnkelsdalr (Hrafnkell's valley).

Hrafnkell also has a large temple erected and performs lavish sacrificial ceremonies. He dedicates his favourite horse, named Freyfaxi, to his patron god Freyr, along with the best of his other possessions and livestock. He swears that he will kill anyone who rides Freyfaxi without permission. From his religious activities Hrafnkell comes to be known as Freysgoði (Freyr's goði).

Hrafnkell longs for power and soon establishes himself as a chieftain by bullying people in neighbouring valleys. He has a penchant for duels and never pays weregild for anyone he kills.

Now the saga introduces Einar, a shepherd of Hrafnkell's. On one occasion Einar needs to ride to perform his duties, but every horse he approaches runs away from him except Freyfaxi. He then takes Freyfaxi and rides him for the day. But after the horse has been ridden it runs home to Aðalból and starts neighing. On seeing his horse dirty and wet with sweat, Hrafnkell realises what has happened. He rides out with his axe and reluctantly kills Einar to fulfil his oath.

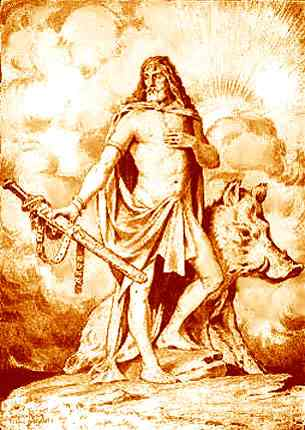
Although the Norse god Freyr functions as Hrafnkell's patron deity, the saga contains few supernatural elements

Einarr's father, Þorbjörn, upset at the death of his son, goes to Hrafnkell to seek weregild. Hrafnkell tells him that he pays weregild for no man. He does, however, think that this killing was among the worst he has done and is prepared to make some amends. He makes a seemingly favourable offer to Þorbjörn of taking care of him for the rest of his days.

Þorbjörn, however, wants nothing short of a formal settlement as between equals. Upon Hrafnkell's rejection of this, Þorbjörn starts searching for ways to achieve satisfaction. (The laws of the Icelandic Commonwealth guarantee every free man the same rights — but since no central executive power exists, a common man would have difficulty in prosecuting a goði. He would generally need the support of another goði, both for the complicated legal manoeuvring often necessary and, if successful at the assembly, for subsequently enforcing the verdict.)

Þorbjörn tries to get the support of his brother Bjarni, but the latter does not want to become involved in a dispute with the powerful Hrafnkell. Þorbjörn then goes to Bjarni's son, Sámr. He, in turn, first advises Þorbjörn to accept Hrafnkell's offer but Þorbjörn remains adamant. Sámr has no desire to join the conflict, but after his uncle gets emotional he reluctantly agrees. Sámr formally accepts the case from Þorbjörn so that he effectively becomes the plaintiff.

Sámr starts preparing the case against Hrafnkell and summons him to the Alþing (Althing) the next summer. Hrafnkell regards the attempt as laughable. When Sámr and Þorbjörn reach the assembly at Þingvellir they quickly discover that no major chieftain wants to aid them. The emotional Þorbjörn now wants to give up, but Sámr insists they must proceed one way or the other.

By a coincidence Sámr and Þorbjörn meet Þorkell Þjóstarsson, a young adventurer from Vestfirðir (Westfjords). He sympathises with their cause and helps them achieve the support of his brother Þorgeirr, a powerful chieftain. With Þorgeirr's support Sámr competently prosecutes the case. The law finds Hrafnkell guilty, and he rides home to Aðalból. Sámr now has the right to kill Hrafnkell and confiscate his property. One early morning Sámr, supported by Þorgeirr and Þorkell, arrives at Aðalból, surprising and capturing Hrafnkell while he sleeps.

Sámr offers Hrafnkell two options: firstly execution on the spot; or secondly to live as Sámr's subordinate, stripped of his honour and most of his property. Hrafnkell chooses to live. Þorkell cautions Sámr that he will regret sparing Hrafnkell's life. (Note: All manuscripts have Þorkell making this comment, but Sigurður Nordal suggested this was out of character, and the speaker's name should be emended to Þorgeirr. Some editions have incorporated this emendation.)

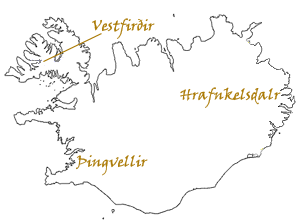
Hrafnkels saga spans a large part of Iceland

Sámr subsequently takes up residence at Aðalból and invites the locals for a feast. They agree to accept him as their new chieftain. Hrafnkell builds himself a new home in another valley. His spirits and ambition remain unbroken, and after a few years of hard work he has again established himself as a respectable chieftain.

Þorkell and Þorgeirr decide to "deliver Freyfaxi to his owner" and push him off a cliff. They also set fire to Hrafnkell's temple. Upon hearing this Hrafnkell remarks: I think it is folly to have faith in gods, and he never performs another sacrifice. His manner improves and he becomes much gentler with his subordinates. In this way, he gains popularity and loyalty. (Note: The synopsis follows the same order of events as the saga. Some commentators have found it illogical that the saga does not describe the death of Freyfaxi and Hrafnkell's reaction to it immediately after the humiliation of Hrafnkell at Aðalból. Sigurður Nordal considered this a fault in the saga but Óskar Halldórsson defended it on the grounds that it makes Hrafnkell's character development more logical.)

After six years of peace, Hrafnkell decides the time for revenge has come. He receives news that Sámr's brother, Eyvindr, is travelling close by with a few companions. He gathers his own men and goes to attack him. Sámr gets word of the battle and immediately rides out with a small force to aid his brother. They arrive too late.

The next morning Hrafnkell surprises Sámr when he is asleep and offers him a similar choice to the one he had received from him six years before, with no weregild paid for Eyvind. Like Hrafnkell, Sámr also chooses to live. Hrafnkell then takes up residence at Aðalból, his old home, and resumes the duties of a chieftain.

Sámr rides west and again seeks the support of Þorkell and Þorgeirr, but they tell him he has only himself to blame for his misfortune. He should have killed Hrafnkell when he had the chance. They will not support Sámr in another struggle with Hrafnkell but offer him to move his residence to their region. He refuses and rides back home. Sámr lives as Hrafnkell's subordinate for the rest of his days, never achieving revenge.

Hrafnkell, on the other hand, lives as a respected leader until he meets a peaceful end. His sons become chieftains after his day. (Note: The exploits of Hrafnkell's descendants appear in the sequel to Hrafnkels saga, Fljótsdæla saga.)

== From writer to reader ==
=== Preservation ===
The author of Hrafnkels saga remains completely unidentified. The text does not name him; nor does any other extant source. He was, however, certainly an Icelander and probably lived near the area which serves as the setting for the saga's events. (Note: "Nothing is known of the authorship"; "identity of the author... will probably never be established".) Sigurður Nordal thought it was written by a chieftain. Hermann Pálsson detected a tone of Christian catechism and was convinced it was the work of a cleric. Hermann Pálsson further reasoned that it was penned by the bishop Brandur Jónsson written shortly before his death 1264, (Note: Hermann Pálssonthought the saga modeled after a real-life feud involving the bishop's own kinsmen in the years 1248–1255, making the work a roman à clef.) but other commentators have assessed his amassed evidence to be insufficient.

The precise time of composition of the saga also remains unknown, but the late 13th century seems most likely. (Note: Finnur Jónsson (1898) dated it to no later than c. 1200; Sigurður Nordal thought it was later, "the same time as Njala in the last quarter of the thirteenth century. Hermann Pálsson as already noted dated it to 1263 or 4. Current consensus seems to be late 13th century, i.e. ca. 1300.) The oldest extant manuscript uses vellum from the first half of the 15th century, but unfortunately only one page remains. Paper copies made from the complete manuscript preserve the full text of the saga. The partially extant skin manuscript may well have copied the original composition directly. In any case the saga seems faithful to the original, with little rewriting and few accidental errors. (Note: Jón Helgason, who published an edition of the saga, considered there to be two distinct "branches", the parchment group and paper manuscript group, but Einar Ólafur Sveinsson commented, "There are some, although no great differences between them".)

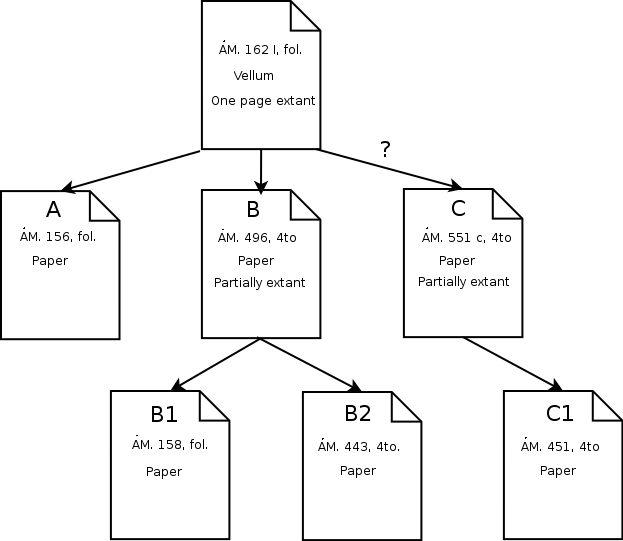
Hrafnkels saga survives in many manuscripts, but only about seven have significance for establishing the most original text.

One class of paper manuscripts, the "AM 551c 4to" and its copy (designated C and C1 in the diagram), (Note: "AM 551c 4to" was also called Mánaskálarbók according to Jakob Jakobsen, who designated it and its copy as D and (D). Jakobsen did not place "AM 496 4to" in his tree, so the letter assignments are different (ABCD as opposed to ABC).) contains a slightly different version of the saga with several, mostly minor, additions. Most scholars have considered it as derived from the same vellum manuscript as the others with additions from the author of Fljótsdæla saga. Thus they believe the shorter text closer to the original, and have given scant attention to the extended version.

=== Publishing history ===
P. G. Thorsen and Konráð Gíslason gave the saga its first publication, in Copenhagen in 1839. Other scholarly editions include that of Jakob Jakobsen in 1902–1903, Jón Jóhannesson in 1950, and Jón Helgason also in 1950.

The saga has seen many popular editions and translations into a number of languages. The popular edition published by Halldór Laxness in 1942 caused a stir for using modern Icelandic spelling for a text in Old Icelandic, without obtaining permission as ordained in a law that had just been passed. The edition's detractors rejected this approach as a perversion of the original text. Its supporters in response depicted the standardised Old Norse spelling as an artificial construct—no closer to the actual manuscripts than the modern spelling—and an unnecessary burden to the casual reader. The latter view won out and the sagas have since frequently appeared using modern spelling conventions.

=== Modern reception ===
The work has drawn high praises from a number of noted scholars. Finnur Jónsson stated, "In respect of its composition the saga is a masterpiece, a spotless pearl among the family sagas". Sigurður Nordal called it "one of the most completely developed short novels in world literature".

Today Hrafnkels saga remains one of the most widely read sagas. Readers especially appreciate it for its cohesive and logical story line; along with its brevity, these qualities make it an ideal first read for newcomers to the sagas. It has served as a standard text in Icelandic high schools and as an introductory text for students of Old Norse.

== Origins ==
Precisely the attributes which make Hrafnkels saga so accessible have served to make it an attractive target for different theories on the origins of the Icelandic sagas. Identical elements sometimes serve to support widely different theories.

=== History ===
Some commentators have seen the sagas as largely historical accounts, preserving events that actually occurred. It was presumed that the events were passed down orally for hundreds of years until committed to writing by faithful scribes. (Note: Setting aside concerns about historicity, the theory that the saga originated as oral transmissions and later set down in writing is the Freiprosa ("freeprosists") position, as discussed below.) Scholars in the 19th century (such as Guðbrandur Vigfússon and Finnur Jónsson) especially espoused this view; it largely went out of fashion in academia by around 1940. (Note: For Sigurður Nordal's Buchprosa position, see below.) (Note: Jesse L. Byock feels the paradigm shift was not so immediate, and says Nordal's Buchprosa ("bookprosist") position became "highly influential since the 1950s".)

Many see Hrafnkels saga as a prime example of accurately preserved oral history. They find the saga inherently plausible in that its characters have logical motivations and the results of their actions are realistic. The text has little supernatural content. It is short enough and cohesive enough for its oral preservation to be entirely plausible. Indeed, the average modern reader can probably retell the story accurately after two or three readings.

But the historical interpretation ran into several problems. When compared with other sources on the same period, notably Landnámabók, discrepancies spring up. As one example, Landnámabók tells us that Hrafnkell had a father named Hrafn, but the saga names him Hallfreðr. (Note: As pointed out by Björn M. Ólsen.) The saga's treatment of the laws of the time also shows inconsistencies with reliable sources such as the Grágás law code. (Note: as noted by legal expert Otto Opet in 1894.)

=== Literature ===
Historical inconsistencies and other difficulties were systematically analysed by E. V. Gordon in his 1939 paper and by Sigurður Nordal in his groundbreaking book Hrafnkatla in 1940. Gordon and Nordal's studies drew on data from many areas to cast doubt on its historical veracity. The conclusion they reached regarding the origin of the saga was that it was not a redaction of oral transmission, but rather a "bookish composition" that is "historically impossible". This stance has been referred to as the Buchprosa or "bookprosist" position.

Gordon pointed out that in the saga, the suit against Hrafnkell occurring at the Althing was an anachronism. Although the Althing was established by 930, the proceedings for manslaughter would have occurred at the local thing, if it occurred at all in this period. (Note: Hrafnkell's outlawry can be calculated to ca. 940, and manslaughter suits were not taken to the Althing until 963.) No outsiders from the north-west would have been able at that time to meddle in this local affair of the east, as happens in the saga; in fact, the meddlers (Þorkell and his goði brother Þorgeirr Þjóstarsson from the Westfjords) are considered fictitious.

Nordal argues that the saga treats geographical facts incorrectly. He claims that the valleys used as the ostensible settings for the events of the story would never have allowed for as great a population as the saga assumes. He also states that the cliff near Aðalból, the alleged site of the killing of Freyfaxi, simply does not exist. (Note: There is a place called Faxahamar that local lore says was Freyfaxi's death place, but it is a small cliff, and "it would be difficult to destroy a horse here in the way described there". Neither is it located where the saga prescribes it.)

Nordal sees the saga's convincing narrative and characters as evidence that a single brilliant author composed it. According to Nordal the author cared little for historical accuracy, and insofar as he may have used any written historical sources, he changed them according to his own whim to fit the plot of the novella he wanted to write.

=== Folklore ===
Another school of thought regarding the origin of the sagas, which came into prominence in the second half of the 20th century, emphasises the elements of folklore and the oral survival of legends for an extended period of time.

In some ways, this marks a revival of the old notion that the saga is an accurate redaction of an orally preserved narrative. This notion is termed the Freiprosa or "freeprosist" position.) But unlike earlier freeprosists, the latter-day proponents regard the narrative as folklore, and therefore, they do not dwell on strict historical accuracy.

They apply modern research to determine which elements of a story seem likely to endure and which seem ephemeral. Theory suggests that core story lines of the sagas will preserve oral elements long-term, whereas one can expect details – such as the names of secondary characters – to change over the centuries.

The Icelandic scholar Óskar Halldórsson wrote a short book on Hrafnkels saga criticising Sigurður Nordal's previous work. According to Óskar such details as an incorrect name for Hrafnkell's father do not constitute valid evidence for the view of the saga as a 13th-century fiction. On the contrary, Óskar takes this as confirmation that the story of Hrafnkell survived independently in the east of Iceland, and changed in unimportant details, long after the composition of Landnámabók.

Óskar traces the story of Freyfaxi back to horse-worship among Indo-European peoples, (Note: After Aslak Liestøl.) and in his opinion such mythic or folkloric themes strengthen the case for the oral preservation of elements of Hrafnkels saga since heathen times.

=== Recent views ===
The controversy on Hrafnkels saga remains unsettled. In a 1988 book, Hermann Pálsson again completely dismisses the idea of an oral tradition and seeks the origins of the saga in mediaeval European ideas. In a departure from previous scholarship, Hermann Pálsson based his research on the extended version of the saga.

Jón Hnefill Aðalsteinsson, in his 2000 book on the saga, emphasises its heathen religious elements. While acknowledging that a large part of the story line probably represents 13th-century fiction, Jón Hnefill finds evidence of an oral tradition in such aspects of the story as Hrafnkell's sacrifices and the behaviour of Freyfaxi.

Jónas Kristjánsson, in his 1988 work on the sagas, summed up the argument on Hrafnkels saga when he said that the great interest in it "has led to deeper consideration of other texts ... It has become a test-case, the classic example, in the discussion of relations between unsophisticated oral story-telling and learned well-read authors, between inherited pragmatic attitudes and imported Christian ethics."

== Editions ==
Editions cited

- Halldór Laxness, ed. (1942). Hrafnkatla. Reykjavík: Ragnar Jónsson, Stefán Ögmundsson.
- Jakobsen, Jakob, ed. (1903). Austfirðinga sǫgur. Copenhagen: S. L. Møllers bogtrykkeri.
- Jón Helgason, ed. (1950). Hrafnkels saga Freysgoða. Nordisk filologi Tekster III. Reykjavík: E. Munksgaard.
- Jón Jóhannesson, ed. (1950). Austfirðinga sǫgur. Íslenzk fornrit XI. Reykjavík: Hið íslenzka fornritafélag.
- Peder Thorsen; Konráð Gíslason, eds. (1839). Sagan af Hrafnkeli Freysgoða. Copenhagen: Trykt hos B. Luno.

== English translations ==
- Coles, John, tr. (1882). "The Story of Hrafnkell, Frey's Priest". Summer Travellings in Iceland. London: John Murray. pp. 230–49 – via sagadb.org.
- Connors, Colin, tr. (2015). The eSaga of Hrafnkell Freysgoði: A New Translation of "Hrafnkels saga Freysgoða". Apple Inc.: iTunes Store. IBA file.
- Gunnell, Terry, tr. (1997). "The Saga of Hrafnkel Frey's Godi". The Complete Sagas of Icelanders. Vol. V. Leifur Eiríksson Publishing. pp. 261–81.
- Hermann Pálsson, tr. (1971b). Hrafnkel's saga and other Icelandic stories. Harmondsworth, UK: Penguin. ISBN 9780141961422.
- Jones, Gwyn, tr. (1935). "Hrafnkel Freysgodi's Saga". Four Icelandic Sagas. New York: American Scandinavian Society. pp. 37–61.
- ——, tr. (1961). "Hrafnkel the Priest of Frey". Eirik the Red and other Icelandic Sagas. Oxford: Oxford University Press. pp. 89–125..
- McGaillard, John C, tr. (1956). "Hrafnkel's saga". World Masterpieces. New York: W.W. Norton & Company. pp. 512–32.
