= Þorsteins saga hvíta =

Icelandic saga

Þorsteins saga hvíta is one of the sagas of Icelanders from the 13th century. The short story takes place in the east of Iceland in the 9th century. The main theme of the story is about the tragic consequences of the vengeance of Þorsteinn hvíti on his former friend Einarr Þórisson, who had spread rumors that he was dead in order to be able to marry Torstein's fiancée Helga Krákadóttir.

== Other sources ==
- Jónas Kristjánsson (1997) Eddas and Sagas: Iceland's Medieval Literature (Reykjavik: Hið íslenska bókmenntafélag. Peter Foote, trans)

== Related reading ==
- Jesse Byock (1993) Feud in the Icelandic Saga (University of California Press) ISBN 978-0520082595
- Crocker, Christopher. “Narrating Blindness and Seeing Ocularcentrism in Þorsteins saga hvíta.” Gripla 31 (2020): 267–292.
