= Triquet =

Triquet may refer to:

- Triquet Island, an island off the west coast of British Columbia, Canada
- Paul Triquet (1910–1980), a Canadian brigadier general
- Mr Triquet, a character in the opera Eugene Onegin
