= Jón Hnefill Aðalsteinsson =

Icelandic scholar and folklorist

Jón Hnefill Aðalsteinsson (29 March 1927 – 2 March 2010) was an Icelandic folklorist, philologist, and theologian. He was the first professor of folklore at the University of Iceland and published extensively, particularly on Old Norse religion.

== Early life and education ==
Jón Hnefill was born in Hrafnkelsdalur in East Iceland, where his father farmed; in 2000 he published a book arguing that Hrafnkels saga Freysgoða, which takes place in the valley, contains more historical truth about heathen religious practice derived from oral tradition than has been generally thought since Sigurður Nordal's 1940 book Hrafnkatla. He was the eldest son in a family of ten children and one foster child; his brother Stefán became a geneticist in Oslo and his youngest brother Ragnar Ingi, a writer and academic in Icelandic literature.

After finishing school at Menntaskólinn á Akureyri in 1948, he earned a bachelor's degree in religious history, religious psychology, and philosophy in 1958 from Stockholm University, a Cand. Theol. in theology in 1960 from the University of Iceland, and a Ph. Lic. in 1966 and PhD in 1979 in folklore from the University of Uppsala, where he studied under Dag Strömbäck.

== Career ==
In 1960, Jón Hnefill was ordained, and he served as a priest in Eskifjörður for the next four years. He also worked as a journalist for the newspaper Morgunblaðið and taught at a variety of Icelandic schools and institutions of higher education, including in the divisions of philosophy, social science, and theology at the University of Iceland and from 1969 to 1988 at Menntaskólinn við Hamrahlíð. In 1983–84 he was an Honorary Research Fellow at University College London.

In 1988 he became the first docent in folklore at the University of Iceland, and in 1992 the first professor. He was a full member of the Folklore Fellows. In 1998 he was the recipient of a festschrift, titled Þjóðlíf og Þjóðtrú.

His scholarly work focussed on the area of Old Norse religion, particularly in Iceland, drawing on both philology and folkloristics. His PhD thesis, published in English as Under the Cloak, concerned the role of shamanic trance in the decision taken in the year 1000 that Iceland would convert to Christianity, and a number of his articles on Old Norse religion were collected in English translation as A Piece of Horse Liver.

During his lifetime he served as chairman of the Icelandic Folklore Association, the Icelandic Historical Association, and the Icelandic Teachers' Association, and was a board member of the Nordic Teachers' Association. He was also chairman of the East Iceland constituency council of the Independence Party.

== Selected works ==
Jón Hnefill published prolifically, in several languages. Among his books were:

- Kristnitakan á Íslandi. Reykjavík: Almenna bókafélagið, 1971; rev. ed. Háskólaútgáfan/University of Iceland Press, 1999. ISBN 9789979543794
- Under the cloak: The acceptance of Christianity in Iceland with particular reference to the religious attitudes prevailing at the time. Studia ethnologica Upsaliensia 4, 1978. OCLC 1153058792 (PhD thesis)
  - Under the Cloak: A Pagan Ritual Turning Point in the Conversion of Iceland. Reykjavík: University of Iceland, 1979; rev. ed. 1999 ISBN 9789979543800
- Þjóðtrú og þjóðfræði. Reykjavík: Iðunn, 1985 OCLC 63345450
- A Piece of Horse Liver: Myth, Ritual, and Folklore in Old Icelandic Sources. Reykjavík: University of Iceland Press, 1998. ISBN 9789979542643 (collected essays in English translation)
- Þá hneggjaði Freyfaxi: Frá staðfræði til uppspuna í Hrafnkels sögu Freysgoða. Reykjavík: Háskólaútgáfan/University of Iceland Press, 2000. ISBN 9979-54-431-7

== Personal life ==
He was married in 1955 to the writer and Member of Alþingi Svava Jakobsdóttir, who died in 2004; they had one son, Jakob S. Jónsson, a director and playwright. He had two sons from previous relationships, Kristján Jóhann Jónsson, who teaches Icelandic literature at the University of Iceland, and Örlygur Hnefill Jónsson, a lawyer.
