= Sörla þáttr (Brodd-Helgasonar) =

15th century Icelandic saga

Do not confuse with Sörla þáttr eða Heðins saga ok Högna

Sörla þáttr (Brodd-Helgasonar) is a Þáttr, an Icelandic short saga, known from the 15th century. It is extant in the manuscript AM 162 C fol. ("C-version") of Ljósvetninga saga, which contains three such þættir. Whether or not these texts are independent of the larger Ljósvetninga saga narrative has been much discussed in scholarship since the late 19th century.

The main characters are Sörla, son of Brodd-Helga Þorgilsson and his loved one, Þórdís, daughter of Ljósvetninga saga's main character Guðmundr inn ríki, who opposes their marriage.
