= Króka-Refs rímur =

17th-century narrative poem by Hallgrímur Pétursson

Króka-Refs rímur, by Hallgrímur Pétursson, is one of several verse retellings of the medieval Icelandic saga Króka-Refs saga in the form known as rímur.

== Composition ==
The date of composition is uncertain, with proposals ranging from when Hallgrímur was in his twenties (1634–44) to the mid-seventeenth century. Hallgrímur's other rímur are adapted from non-Icelandic sources, but within Króka-Refs rímur, Hallgrímur intimates that "he wants to show his country the respect it deserves by choosing from its literary creations". Lea D. Pokorny has commented that "it might seem curious that he chose Refur over some of the other saga protagonists but perhaps he felt connected to the witty and well-versed trouble maker, who not only composes poetry but also plays with words continuously throughout the saga". In Pokorny's view, "it may be assumed that Króka-Refs rímur were amongst others enjoyed by multiple layers of Icelandic society, spanning from professionals to people without formal education."

The poem survives in at least eighteen manuscripts.

== Editions ==
- Hallgrímur Pétursson. Króka-Refs rímur og Rímur af Lykla-Pétri og Magelónu eftir síra Hallgrím Pétursson. Edited by Finnur Sigmundsson. Rit Rímnafélagsins 7. Reykjavík: Rímnafélagið, 1956.
