= Hænsa-Þóris saga =

13th-century Icelandic saga

Hænsa-Þóris saga (Old Norse: Hœnsa-Þóris saga [ˈhøːnsa-ˌθoːres ˈsaɣa]; Icelandic: Hænsna-Þóris saga [ˈhainstna-ˌθouːrɪs ˈsaːɣa]; "The Saga of Hen-Thorir") is one of the sagas of Icelanders.

== Plot ==
It tells the story of Hænsa-Þórir (Old Norse: Hœnsa-Þórir [-ˌθoːrez̠]; Icelandic: Hænsna-Þórir [-ˈθouːrɪr̥]; hænsn means "a hen"), a poor and unpopular man who acquires wealth as a merchant and manages to buy land. In the saga the upstart is compared negatively to his neighbours, who come from a more solid background; he causes strife between them. Eventually Hænsa-Þórir refuses to sell the neighbours hay for the winter. When they take the hay anyway, he burns them alive in their farmstead. A vendetta ensues in which Hænsa-Þórir is killed and beheaded; the neighbours then seal their differences with a marriage between their families.

== Themes ==
The saga highlights aspects of Icelandic culture, such as hospitality to guests and travellers, (expected) generosity to one's neighbours, and the need to gather support of a chieftain in order to obtain justice. Ari Þorgilsson mentions the events in his Íslendingabók in connection with a change in Icelandic law, whereby a legal complaint was no longer to be brought to the closest Thing (assembly) but to the Quarter Thing. It has also been suggested that Hænsa-Þóris saga was written in response to a change in the law originating from King Magnus VI of Norway. According to the new law, a farmer was obliged to sell his neighbours hay if they were in great need. If he refused to sell the hay, he had to pay a fine, and if he resisted with force, his neighbours could attack him in turn without committing a crime. This was a novelty in Icelandic jurisprudence, and a formal objection was raised against it at the Althing in 1281. According to this theory, the saga was written as propaganda in favour of the new law.
