= Edziza obsidian =

Naturally formed volcanic glass from Canada

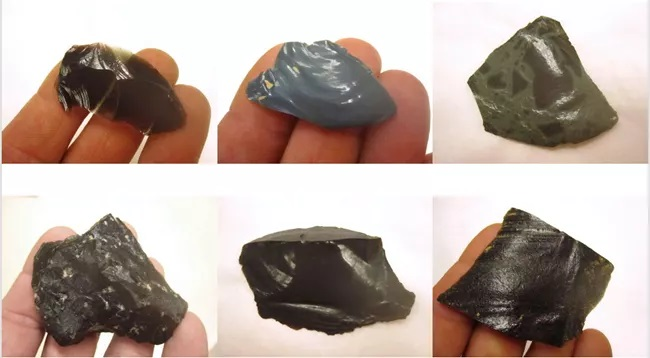
Edziza obsidian found in coastal areas of southeast Alaska

Edziza obsidian is a naturally formed volcanic glass found at the Mount Edziza volcanic complex in northwestern British Columbia, Canada. It occurs in at least four geological formations of the volcanic complex and was widely used by Indigenous peoples during the pre-Columbian era. As a result of its widespread use, Edziza obsidian has been found in several archaeological sites throughout the Pacific Northwest.

== Sources ==
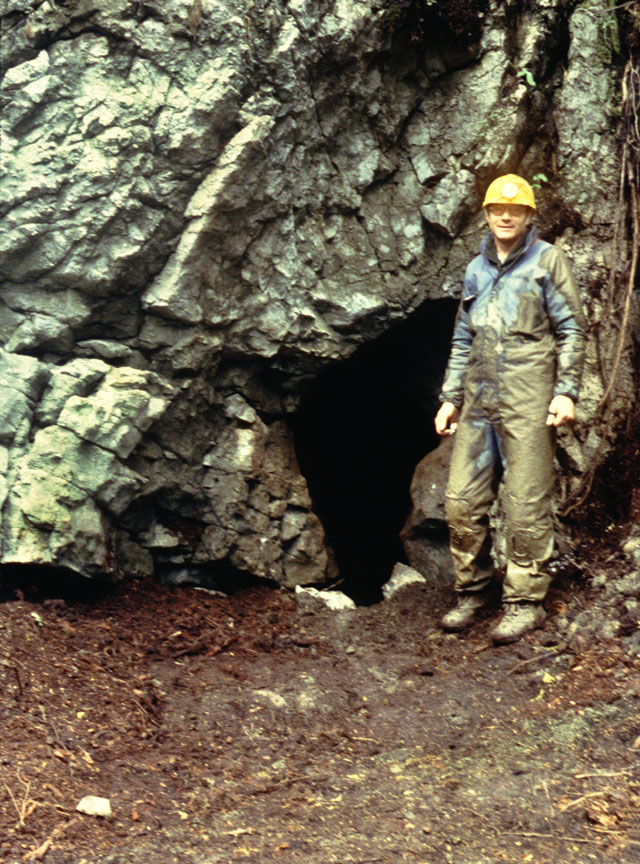
Edziza obsidian has been found at the On Your Knees Cave in Alaska

Edziza obsidian occurs as lava flows at various elevations throughout the northern and southern ends of the Mount Edziza volcanic complex. The largest occurrence of Edziza obsidian is centred on Goat Mountain in the Spectrum Range where it is associated with the Spectrum Formation. Edziza obsidian associated with the Armadillo Formation occurs at Artifact Creek, Fan Creek, Coffee Crater, Destell Pass and Cartoona Peak. The obsidian also occurs on The Pyramid, a lava dome of the Pyramid Formation. Sorcery Ridge of the Ice Peak Formation also contains Edziza obsidian.

== Distribution ==
Edziza obsidian is the most widely distributed obsidian in western North America and perhaps the most widely distributed obsidian in subarctic North America, occurring over an area of more than 2,200,000 km^{2} (850,000 mi^{2}). It has been recovered from archaeological sites in Alaska, Yukon, western Alberta and along the British Columbia Coast, having been used by North American indigenous peoples to make stone tools as early as 10,000 years ago. The obsidian was especially used for thousands of years by the Tahltan people who live adjacent to the Mount Edziza volcanic complex.

In Alaska, Edziza obsidian has been recovered from the 10,300-year soil layer level of the On Your Knees Cave archaeological site on Prince of Wales Island. A 4,100-year-old Tlingit village site near Coffman Cove dubbed 49-PET-067 also contains Edziza obsidian. In Alberta, flakes of Edziza obsidian have been found at Patricia Lake near the town of Jasper. In British Columbia, two fragments of Edziza obsidian have been recovered from the Bluejackets Creek archaeological site on Haida Gwaii and are presumably of late Holocene age.

== See also ==
- Volcanism of the Mount Edziza volcanic complex
