= Hrana saga hrings =

Icelandic saga

Hrana saga hrings is one of the sagas of Icelanders. Written around the 13th-14th century, existing now only in manuscripts from 1824 transcribed by Gísli Brynjúlfsson (1794-1827) in the manuscript KBAdd 62 4to. The saga tells of the adventures of Hrani Ring (Hrani hringr) so named since he had a red ring on his left cheek.
