= Atla saga Ótryggssonar =

Icelandic saga

Atla saga Ótryggssonar (Icelandic pronunciation: [ˈahtla ˈsaːɣa ˈouːˌtʰrɪksˌsɔːnar̥]) is a relatively recent text in the genre of sagas of Icelanders, most probably written in the 19th century. The oldest known manuscript with this text is from 1820, where it is written down in a manuscript together with other, older saga texts.

The saga takes place in Norway and Iceland during the age of the settlement of Iceland (10th century). The main character, Atli, grew up as an ash lad (kolbítr), but after he comes of age, he avenges the murder of his father and emigrates to Iceland.
