= Timothy H. Heaton =

Professor of Earth science at university of south Dakota (USD)

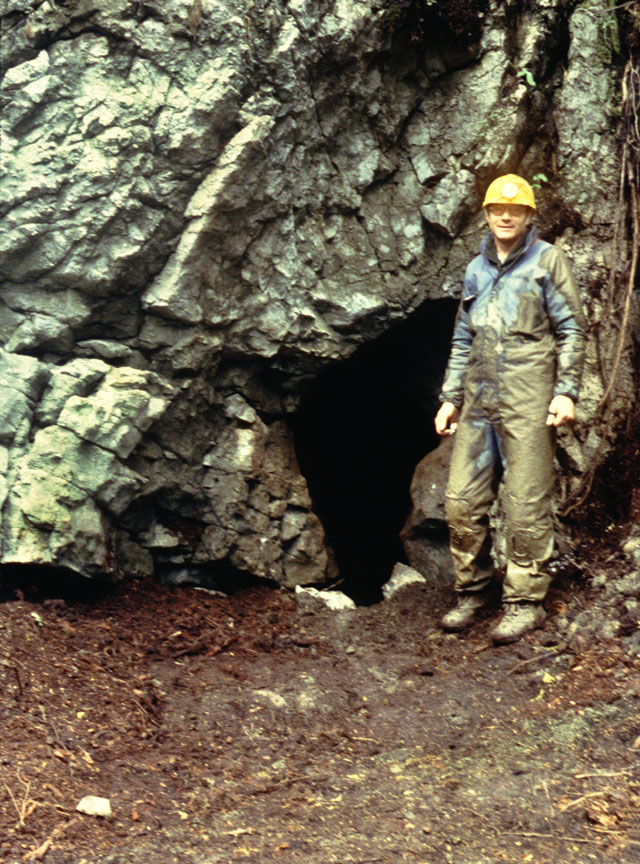
Timothy H. Heaton at the On Your Knees Cave in Alaska

Timothy H. Heaton is a professor of earth sciences at The University of South Dakota (USD), Vermillion, specializing in archaeological geology. Much of Heaton's work is focused on the Great Basin as well as on forming chronologies for the extinction of many Ice Age animals. He is most widely known for his work at On Your Knees Cave located in Prince of Wales Island in southeast Alaska where early humans remains ca. 10,300 years old were found. This find is one of the oldest human genetic samples recovered in the Americas. The site record further supports the possibility the first people into the Americas south of the ice sheets traveled along the Alaskan coast by boat rather than overland through central Canada. He also discovered a new species of fossil skunk (Brachyprotoma) at Crystal Ball Cave, Utah.

Heaton has also devoted much of his time evaluating the scientific merits of young-Earth creationist geology and the application of biblical evidence to understanding the earth's prehistory.

== Background ==
Timothy Heaton grew up in Utah and was fascinated by the desert canyons of the Colorado River drainage, which led him to pursue a career in geology. He soon became an active hiker and caver in the Grand Canyon. As a graduate student, Heaton learned that the Institute for Creation Research (ICR) was conducting tours through the Grand Canyon teaching that the Earth was only a few thousand years old. This notion fueled his study of the canyon and also led to his review of a publication titled Grand Canyon: Monument to Catastrophe edited and primarily written by Steve A. Austin, the chairman of ICR's geology department. In Heaton's review of Austin's publication, Heaton refuted Austin's assertion that the Grand Canyon was formed by a single flood event as well as objections to Austin's theory of a young earth.

Heaton received his bachelor's and master's degrees in geology at Brigham Young University in Provo, Utah. He soon went on to earn a Ph.D. in geology at Harvard University. He did post-doctoral study at the Smithsonian Institution in Washington, D.C., prior to joining University of South Dakota's Department of Earth Sciences.

== Current employment ==
Currently, Heaton is a professor of Earth Sciences at the University of South Dakota, Vermillion and chair person of the Earth Sciences and Physics Department. He has taught courses such as Historical Geology, Oceanography, Paleontology and the Evolution-Creation debate.

== Awards and honors ==
While excavating for ice age animal fossils at the On Your Knees Cave site on Prince of Wales Island, Alaska in 1996, Heaton unearthed human remains. An article Heaton co-authored that provided detailed information about the find was placed by Discover magazine in the number 32 spot for top science story for 2007. This find supports the theory that humans first made it to America along the western coast line of North America.

== Key excavations ==
Heaton has conducted field and analysis projects at On Your Knees Cave, Alaska; the Crystal Ball Cave in Millard County, Utah; the Snake Creek Burial Cave in White Pine County, Nevada; and the Porcupine Cave located in the Western Uinta Mountains of Utah.

Heaton and a number of undergraduate students from the University of South Dakota have continued excavating caves found on the Prince of Wales Island in Alaska. The excavations were funded by grants from the National Science Foundation and the National Geographic Society.

On Your Knees Cave, Alaska

A current theory in the anthropological community is that the first people to occupy the Americas had migrated from Southeast Asia via the Bering Land Bridge and then continued a coastal migration into the Americas. Archaeological, physical anthropological, and linguistic evidence is used in of support these inquiries. On Your Knees Cave Site on Prince of Wales Island on the southern Pacific coast of Alaska produced early human remains dating to ca. 10,000 years ago. It is called the On Your Knees Cave because you have to crawl on your hands and knees in order to enter the cave. There are caves in many parts of Prince of Wales Island due to Southeastern Alaska's karst topography.

In 1996, Heaton and his team of excavators discovered the human remains of a deceased male in his twenties, which include a mandible, the remains of a right pelvis, a series of vertebrae, and several teeth. The mandible was carbon dated at an Accelerator Mass Spectrometry facility in California to 9,730 years before present. According to Heaton, this research will help determine the terrestrial and marine animals that occupied this region in the past and present and aid in examining the Last Glacial Maximum’s effects on their existence. The goal of this project is to establish the time period of glaciation, the existence of coastal areas where land mammals survived through the ice age, and whether humans first entered North America by this coastal route.

There are two conclusions that Heaton and his associates came to after their extensive survey and archeological excavating of the Southeast Alaska area. Firstly, the animal record (under study by Heaton and Fred Grady) demonstrates that coastal Southeast Alaska contained ice-free land areas which were occupied by many terrestrial and marine animals during all of the Last Glacial Maximum. This evidence shows that humans could have survived in this environment at the time. Secondly, the archaeological record (under study by James Dixon and colleagues) shows that though this was not the earliest settlement in the Americas, it proves that people occupied Southeast Alaska much earlier than thought, which makes the Northwest Coast an even more likely route for entry into the Americas.

== Selected papers ==
- Heaton, Timothy H. 1985. Quaternary Paleontology and Paleoecology of Crystal Ball Cave, Millard County, Utah: with emphasis on mammals and description of a new species of fossil skunk. The Great Basin Naturalist 45(3) Provo, Utah. Brigham Young University: 337–390.
- Heaton, Timothy H. 1987. Initial Investigation of Vertebrate Remains from Snake Creek Burial Cave, White Pine County, Nevada. Current Research in the Pleistocene, vol. 4; 107–109. Museum of Comparative Zoology, Harvard University, Cambridge, MA.
- Heaton, Timothy H. 1988. Bears and Man at Porcupine Cave, Western Uinta Mountains, Utah. Current Research in the Pleistocene, vol. 5: 71–73. Museum of Comparative Zoology, Harvard University, Cambridge, MA.
- Heaton, Timothy H. 1989. Cladogenesis in a Lineage of Leptomeryx (Artiodactyla, Mammalia) from the Chadronian of Flagstaff Rim, Natrona County, Wyoming. Journal of Vertebrate Paleontology 19 (3): 24A-25A.
- Heaton, Timothy H. 1993. The Oligocene Rodent Ischyromys of the Great Plains: Replacement Mistaken for Anagenesis. Journal of Paleontology 67(2): 297–308.
- Heaton, Timothy H. 2009. Recent Developments in Young-Earth Creationist Geology. Science&Education 18(10): 1341–1358.
