= Gunnars saga Keldugnúpsfífls =

Icelandic saga

Gunnars saga Keldugnúpsfífls (modern Icelandic pronunciation: [ˈkʏnnar̥s ˈsaːɣa ˈcʰɛltʏˌknupsˌfipl̥s]) is one of the sagas of Icelanders. It is a late saga composed in the 15th or 16th century. It survives in 17th-century manuscripts.

The saga takes place in Norway and Iceland in the latter part of the 9th century. It is about two brothers, Gunnar and Helge. Growing up in Keldugnúp [ˈcʰɛltʏˌknuːp], Gunnar was considered to be a fool (fífl [ˈfipl̥]). Gunnar and Helge make a trip to Norway. Here, Gunnar defeats one of the men of Haakon Jarl (Håkon Sigurdsson). Gunnar later returns to Iceland and marries.

== Other sources ==
- Vidar Hreinsson, ed. (1997) The Complete Sagas of Icelanders (Reykjavík: Leifur Eiriksson Publishing. translator: Sarah M. Anderson) ISBN 9789979929307
