= Saga Age =

The Saga Age (Icelandic: Söguöld [ˈsœːɣʏˌœlt]) is the period in Icelandic history during which the majority of the sagas of Icelanders are set. It runs from the settlement of Iceland in 870 until about 1056 when the first bishop in Iceland founded a church at Skálaholt.

== The History of the Saga Age ==
What remains for sources about the Saga Age is few and far between. The two main sources are the Íslendingabók (Book of Icelanders) and the Landnámabók (Book of Settlements). In these sources it is demonstrated that the Scandinavians who first migrated to the area had four important colonists; one for each quarter of the country. Specifically for the Landnámabók, or Book of Settlers, the first colonists are catalogued in a clockwise fashion starting from where the settlers landed to where they travelled and settled.

=== Western Quarter ===
When discussing the western quarter of Iceland, what is meant is the area around Breiðafjörður. This is the bay that lies between the Westfjords and Snæfellsnes. Within the written sources that still remain, Ari Thorgilsson, an Icelandic medieval chronicler, tells of the only woman of these four important colonists. This colonist was know by two names: Aud the Deep-Minded (Ketilsdóttir) or Unn the Deep-Minded. The use of name depends on the saga that is used in reference to her.

== Bibliography ==
- Jesch, Judith (1991), Women in the Viking Age, Boydell Press.
- Smiley, Jane (2005). The Sagas of the Icelanders. Penguin UK. ISBN 978-0-14-193326-9. "In Iceland, the age of Vikings is also called the Saga Age."
- Somerville, Angus A.; McDonald, Russell Andrew (2013). The Vikings and Their Age. University of Toronto Press. p. 106. ISBN 978-1-4426-0522-0.
