= Króka-Refs saga =

14th-century Icelandic saga

Króka-Refs saga or the Saga of Ref the Sly is one of the Icelanders' sagas. Written in the 14th century the saga relates the adventures of Ref Steinsson, whose unpromising origins lead him to greatness in both combat and subterfuge.

== History ==
Although first recorded between 1350 and 1400 AD, the only completely preserved saga is dated to the second half of the fifteenth century. Taking place between 950 and 1050 AD, the saga spans much of the Norse world, including Iceland, Greenland, Norway, and Denmark. The Christianization of Scandinavia occurs during the timeline of the saga, with the main character, Ref, converting as well.

== Synopsis ==
The saga begins in Iceland with an old man named Stein, who has a wife named Thorgerd (Þorgerðr). They have a son named Ref who is known for being very lazy. Stein has a neighbor named Thorbjorn (Þorbjörn), an unpopular man that has committed many manslaughters and never paid retribution. For the most part, there is little conflict between the men and they are able to settle any disputes.

However, after Stein dies from illness and Thorgerd is left to run the farm by herself, Thorbjorn allows his livestock to graze on Thorgerd's land. Thorgerd then hires a man named Bardi (Barði) to help keep Thorbjorn's livestock off her land. After some encouragement from his wife, Thorbjorn slays Bardi in his own shed. After learning of Bardi's death, Thorgerd callsd her son Ref a coward for being useless and doing nothing at such a time. Ref then goes to Thorbjorn's farmhouse and kills Thorbjorn with a spear. Thorgerd sends Ref to her brother Gest while the killing is settled. There, Ref finds that he is an exceptional craftsman and builds one of the greatest ships ever to have been built in Iceland, after having only seen a toy model of a boat. Ref uses this ship to sail to Greenland, where he meets a man named Bjorn, who asks Ref to put up buildings on his land.

Bjorn has a daughter named Helga, and Bjorn grants Ref his daughter's hand in marriage. Ref and Helga have three sons named Stein, Bjorn, and Thormod, and take over running the farm, with Bjorn continuing to live there. Near their farm lives a man named Thorgils, a hateful and difficult man. Thorgils and his sons begin spreading slanderous rumors about Ref around the area, so Ref goes to Thorgil's farm seeking reparations. When Thorgils refuses to offer any compensation, Ref kills him and goes to their boathouse to wait for his sons to return, then kills them too. Ref leaves on a ferry with his wife and children and can't be found, leading some to believe they have perished.

At this time King Harald Hardrada of Norway sends one of his men, named Bard, to Greenland to acquire rare items. After reaching Greenland, Bard meets Gunnar, son-in-law of Thorgils, who tells him about Ref. They gather seven men and launch an expedition into the wilderness in search of Ref. Eventually they come upon a great fortification near the bay and are greeted by Ref. Bard quickly orders his men to burn down the fort, but water flows out of the fort and puts out the fire. After this Bard, Gunnar, and their men all leave, unsure how to proceed. Bard returns to Norway with fine gifts from Gunnar, including a polar bear, a walrus skull, and a chessboard made of walrus ivory, that he presents to the king. Bard explains that all Gunnar wants in return is friendship and counsel on how to deal with Ref. King Harald warns Bard not to return to Greenland, but says that if he does, he should try to dig up the water pipes leading to the fort so that the people inside will have no way of putting out a fire.

Bard returns to Greenland, where he again meets Gunnar, and they sail off with their men to find Ref. When they arrive they do as King Harald has said and dig up the water pipes before setting fire to the fort. This time the fort catches fire but the wall facing the water falls outwards, killing four of Bard's men. As the wall falls, a ship containing Ref and his sons runs down the wall on rollers into the water. Bard and his men jump into their ship and are catching up with Ref. Seeing this, Ref tells his sons to slow down so that Bard can overtake them. At the moment that Bard passes them, Ref throws a spear through Bard and tells his son to cut through the stays of Bard's ship. Gunnar and his men then go after Ref themselves, but by this time it is dark and Ref slips away. Bard's men returns to Norway with his body and tells King Harald about their encounter.

Ref and his family leave Greenland for Norway, where Ref takes on the alias of Narfi. While Helga is alone in the hut they have rented, a man named Grani, who works for King Harald, enters and tries to have his way with her. While Helga is fighting him off, Ref returns and Grani runs away. Ref is able to chase him down and kill him. Ref thinks it would be better not to keep the killing secret and thus be charged with murder, and asks Helga to return to the ship. Disguised as an old man, Ref enters King Harald's assembly and confesses to the killing in a riddle. After deciphering the riddle, King Harald sends his men to search for Ref. During this time Ref sails to Denmark, where he tells King Sweyn his story. The king gives Ref a farmstead and estates in exchange for his sons’ services. King Harald sends Eirik, Grani's brother, and with him sixty men, to Denmark to kill Ref. When they arrive in Denmark they come across an old man who agrees to lead them to Ref. He takes two Norwegians ashore while the others wait on the boat, and leads them into the forest, where Ref's sons and twelve of his followers charge at them and capture them.

The old man rips off his rags and beard, revealing himself to be Ref. King Sweyn has also sent two longships with two hundred men, whom Ref and his men meet before attacking Eirik at sea. All but ten of Eirik's men are killed, but Ref allows Eirik his life since he has killed his brother. Afterwards, King Sweyn awards Ref a gold ring and twelve farms for his bravery. After staying in Denmark for years, Ref leaves on a journey to Rome, and catches an illness that causes his death. Ref's sons Stein and Bjorn remain for a long time with King Sweyn, who arranges fine marriages for them. Ref's other son, Thormod, returns to Iceland.

== Themes ==
- As in other sagas, fate and foreshadowing play a prominent role in the unfolding of the story. During Bard's and Gunnar's first attempt to burn the fort down, Ref proclaims that it wasn't their destiny to guard his corpse, and the attackers soon return home empty-handed. Similarly, before Bard's return to Greenland, King Harald predicts that if he should leave, he won't be coming back. Ultimately, both predictions are realized when Bard is killed trying to capture Ref, who ends up escaping safely to Norway. Fate was an inescapable part of Norse culture, and it was believed that a baby's death was determined the day it was born by three Norns, or women of destiny.
- Another theme of the saga was honor, which was considered to be even more valuable to a man than his own life in Norse culture. Being called a coward or effeminate, was considered the greatest insult of all to a man's honor. Because of this, Ref was duty-bound to kill Thorbjorn after being called a coward by his own mother.
- Another theme of the saga is Ref's name itself. After hearing of the death of Bard, King Harald gives Ref the name of Ref the Sly. Although strong and powerful as well, Ref uses his canniness to outwit his dull opponents, who rely on brute force to get what they want. Ref generally tends to avoid violence and confrontation, unless he is forced to take action.

== Adaptations ==
There have been at least two adaptations of Króka-Refs saga into the Icelandic narrative verse form known as rímur. One version was by one Þorvaldur Rögnvaldsson; later, and more famously, Hallgrímur Pétursson composed his Króka-Refs rímur, sometime in the seventeenth century.(

== See also ==
- Reynard
- Die Geschichte von Fuchs dem Listigen. Deutsch von F. Niedner. In: Grönländer und Färinger-Geschichten. Düsseldorf: E. Diederichs, 1912 (Thule - Altnordische Dichtung und Prosa. Band Nr. XIII). S. 125ff.
- Viking ships
- Lewis Chessmen (possibly similar to the chessboard given to King Harald by Gunnar)
- Sagas of Icelanders

== Other sources ==
- Clark, George. "Saga of Ref the Sly". Trans. of Islendinga sogur III, Reykjavik, 1987.
- Kellogg, Robert, and George Clark. "The Saga of Ref the Sly." The Sagas of Icelanders: A Selection. By Jane Smiley. New York: Viking, 2000. 595-625. Print.
- Short, William R. "Hurstwic: Honor, Dueling, and Drengskapr in the Viking Age." Hurstwic, 2015. Web. 29 Nov. 2015.
- Hallakarva, Gunnora. "Internet History Sourcebooks Project." The Vikings and Homosexuality. Fordham University, n.d. Web. 30 Nov. 2015.
- "International World History Project." VIKINGS. History World International, n.d. Web. 30 Nov. 2015.
