= Jon M. Erlandson =

American archaeologist

Jon McVey Erlandson is an archaeologist, professor emeritus in the Department of Anthropology at the University of Oregon, and the former director of the University of Oregon Museum of Natural and Cultural History. Erlandson’s research interests include coastal adaptations, the peopling of North America, maritime archaeology and historical ecology and human impacts in coastal ecosystems.

== Education and background ==
Erlandson received his B.A. in Biological Anthropology, (formerly, Physical Anthropology) from the University of California, Santa Barbara in 1980. He then completed his M.A. and Ph.D. from the same university in Archaeology. Erlandson was a founding co-editor of the Journal of Island and Coastal Archaeology. He has published more than 400 scholarly articles and edited or written 29 books. In 2013, Erlandson was elected to the American Academy of Arts and Sciences. In 2021 he was elected as a fellow to the American Association for the Advancement of Science.

Erlandson was born in Santa Barbara, California, and enjoyed many different water-based activities, including swimming, surfing and sailing. He moved to Alaska in 1982, and also lived in Washington and Oregon before retiring to California in 2023. In 1989-90 Erlandson worked to protect archaeological sites from damage after the Exxon Valdez oil spill and taught for a year at University of Alaska Fairbanks before joining the faculty at the University of Oregon. His collaborative efforts with marine biologists and ecologists inspired him to become involved in policy issues such as the conservation biology of endangered coastal fisheries and ecosystems. He has won several awards for outstanding teaching and research, as well as for his mentoring of minority students. Discover Magazine named one of Erlandson's papers, “Historical Overfishing and the Recent Collapse of Coastal Ecosystems” by Jeremy Jackson et al., the top science story of 2001.

== Research ==
=== Maritime adaptations ===
Working in California, Oregon, Alaska, and Iceland, Erlandson has extensively researched the beginnings of coastal adaptations and the exploitation of marine resources. Although it was long held true in anthropological theories that access to marine adaptations developed late in human history (the last 10,000 years or so), Erlandson believes otherwise. He points out that hunter-gatherer societies that used aquatic resources were among the most complex and had higher populations than terrestrial hunter-gatherers. Research on the antiquity of maritime societies is complicated by various problems within the archaeological record, including defining exactly what constitutes a “fully maritime” culture. Research on early maritime cultures is also challenging due to changes in the environment, including the rise and fall of sea levels and the erosion of coastal environments. Distinguishing natural deposits from cultural deposits and the rates in which shell and bone disappear from the archaeological record, or taphonomy, are also important issues. Erlandson points out that even with these challenges, there is still archaeological evidence for earlier maritime adaptations. Shell middens in Africa and Europe go back at least 150,000 years, for instance, and one of the earliest archaeological sites in the New World, Monte Verde 2 in Chile, contained several types of seaweed. Erlandson believes that much more is to be learned from the growing number of submerged coastal sites found on the world's continental shelves, especially as such research is extended into deeper waters.

=== Kelp Highway Hypothesis: The Peopling of the New World ===
The “kelp highway” hypothesis is a corollary to the coastal migration theory developed by Erlandson and his colleagues to help explain the peopling of the Americas and the presence of pre-Clovis sites such as Monte Verde and Oregon's Paisley Caves that date to ~14,000 years ago, before the ice-free corridor appears to have opened. In a collaboration between archaeologists and marine ecologists, Erlandson explored the idea of a coastal route into the Americas along the Pacific Coast. This migration route followed a ‘kelp highway’—a line of productive kelp forests that range from northeast Asia to Baja California. Kelp forests support a wide variety of resources that could have supported the earliest inhabitants of North and South America, including the kelp itself, sea mammals, fish and shellfish. This marine highway would have also protected people travelling from the harsher wave conditions of the open sea. Although difficult to evaluate with archaeological evidence due to the rising sea levels after the last Glacial Maximum, Erlandson has summarized extensive evidence for early maritime activity along the Pacific Coast of the Americas, including California’s Channel Islands.

=== Channel Islands: Archaeology and Historical Ecology ===
One way Erlandson explores the above issues is his research on the Channel Islands off the California Coast. The Channel Islands have been populated by humans for more than 13,000 years, and offer a unique opportunity to study coastal adaptations and historical ecology because they have a long and continuous habitation. The islands were home to the Chumash people from at least 9500 years ago until they were removed from the islands around AD 1820. The Channel Islands are also a place to explore relationships between human adaptations and changes in the environment. Erlandson and others have explored the diet of the Island Chumash and their ancestors to get an idea of the changes in their subsistence through time to reconstruct how the Chumash were influenced by their environment, how they altered marine and terrestrial ecosystems, and how they survived and thrived on small islands for millennia.

=== Mosfell Archaeological Project ===
Erlandson’s collaborative work in the Mosfell Valley of Iceland is another example of interdisciplinary research he has been involved in. Working with Jesse Byock (UCLA), Philip Walker (UCSB), and other colleagues, he spent seven field seasons excavating three archaeological sites that were occupied during the Viking Age, from the early 10th to mid-12th century. These sites—including the well-preserved remains of an early Christian church and graveyard, a large Viking longhouse, and a ritual cremation feature located atop a knoll modified to resemble the prow of a ship—span the transitional time period between pagan and Christian Iceland, and are unique for several reasons: there are a host of written records and sagas associated with the farm and its earliest inhabitants, and the fact that the deposits had remained undisturbed. The archaeological evidence at that site showed correlations to the sagas, including the movement of bodies from previous pagan burials to the new Christian graveyard associated with the recently constructed church and the presence of violence related to blood feuds. Finally, the sites included the first archaeological evidence for cremation discovered in Iceland, a common mortuary ritual elsewhere in the Viking world. Before this discovery, the lack of cremation evidence was a source of debates on the initial settlers of Iceland.

== Selected publications ==
=== Selected books, monographs, and edited volumes ===
Braje, Todd, Jon Erlandson, & Torben Rick (2021) Islands Through Time: A Human and Ecological History of California's Northern Channel Islands. New York: Rowman & Littlefield.

Gill, Kristina M., Mikael Fauvelle, & Jon M. Erlandson (editors) (2019) An Archaeology of Abundance: Reevaluating the Marginality of California's Islands. University Press of Florida, Gainesville.

Erlandson, Jon M. & Todd J. Braje (editors) (2013) When Humans Dominated Earth: Archeological Perspectives on the Anthropocene. Anthropocene Special Issue.

Erlandson, Jon M. & Sarah B. McClure (text editors) (2010) 10,000 Years of Shoes: With Photos by Brian Lanker. Eugene: University of Oregon Museum of Natural and Cultural History.

Erlandson, Jon M., Torben C. Rick, & René L. Vellanoweth (2008) A Canyon Through Time: The Archaeology, History, and Ecology of Tecolote Canyon, Santa Barbara County, California. Salt Lake City: University of Utah Press.

Erlandson, Jon M. & Todd J. Braje (volume editors) (2008) Tracking Technologies: Contributions to Understanding Technological Change on California’s Channel Islands. Pacific Coast Archaeological Society Quarterly 40(1).

Rick, Torben C. & Jon M. Erlandson (editors) (2008) Human Impacts on Ancient Marine Ecosystems: A Global Perspective. Berkeley: University of California Press.

Erlandson, Jon M. & Terry Jones (editors) (2002) Catalysts to Complexity: The Late Holocene on the California Coast. Los Angeles: Institute of Archaeology, University of California, Los Angeles

Erlandson, Jon M. and Michael A. Glassow (editors) (1997) The Archaeology of the California Coast during the Middle Holocene. Los Angeles: Institute of Archaeology, University of California, Los Angeles

Erlandson, Jon M. (1994) Early Hunter-Gatherers of the California Coast. New York: Plenum Press.

Moss, Madonna L. and Jon M. Erlandson (editors) (1992) Beyond Culture Areas: Relationships Between Maritime Cultures of Southern Alaska. Arctic Anthropology Volume 29.

Erlandson, Jon McVey (1988) Of Millingstones and Molluscs: The Cultural Ecology of Early Holocene Hunter-Gatherers on the California Coast. Ph.D. Dissertation, UCSB. University Microfilms International, Ann Arbor.

=== Selected journal articles and book chapters ===
Erlandson, Jon M. (2013) "Shell Middens and other Anthropogenic Soils as Global Stratigraphic Signatures for the Anthropocene." In When Humans Dominated the Earth: Archeological Perspectives on the Anthropocene, edited by J.M. Erlandson & T.J. Braje. Anthropocene 4:24–32.

Erlandson, Jon M. (2001) “The Archaeology of Aquatic Adaptations: Paradigms for a New Millennium” Journal of Archaeological Research Vol. 9 No. 4 pp. 287–350

Erlandson, Jon M. et al. (2007) “The Kelp Highway Hypothesis: Marine Ecology, the Coastal Migration Theory, and the Peopling of the Americas” Journal of Island & Coastal Archaeology Vol. 2 Issue 2: 161–174

Erlandson, Jon and Todd J. Braje (2012) “Foundations for the Far West: Paleoindian Cultures on the Western Fringe of North America” in The Oxford Handbook of North American Archaeology ed. Pauketat, Timothy R. Oxford University Press

Erlandson, Jon M. and Torben C. Rick (2010) “Archaeology Meets Marine Ecology: The Antiquity of Maritime Cultures and Human Impacts on Marine Fisheries and Ecosystems” Annual Review of Marine Science 2:165–185

Erlandson, Jon M., Torben C. Rick, and Todd J. Braje (2009) “Fishing up the Food Web?: 12,000 Years of Maritime Subsistence and Adaptive Adjustments on California’s Channel Islands” Pacific Science Vol. 63. Issue 4:711–724

Erlandson, J.M., T.C. Rick, T.J. Braje, M. Casperson, B. Culleton, B. Fulfrost, T. Garcia, D. Guthrie, N. Jew, D. Kennett, M.L. Moss, L.. Reeder, C. Skinner, J. Watts, & L. Willis (2011) Paleoindian Seafaring, Maritime Technologies, and Coastal Foraging on California’s Channel Islands. Science 441:1181–1185.

Rick, Torben C. & J.M. Erlandson (2009) Coastal Exploitation: How Did Ancient Hunter-gatherers Influence Coastal Environments? Science 352:952–953.

Jackson, J., M. Kirby, W. Berger, K. Bjorndal, L. Botsford, B. Bourque, R. Bradbury, R. Cooke, J. Erlandson, J. Estes, T. Hughes, S. Kidwell, C. Lange, H. Lenihan, J. Pandolfi, C. Peterson, R. Steneck, M. Tegner, & R. Warner (2001) Historical overfishing and the recent collapse of coastal ecosystems. Science 293:629–638.

Erlandson, Jon M. (1988) The Role of Shellfish in Coastal Economies: A Protein Perspective. American Antiquity 53(1):102–10

Erlandson, Jon M. (1984) A Case Study in Faunalturbation: Delineating the Effects of the Burrowing Pocket Gopher on the Distribution of Archaeological Materials. American Antiquity 49:785–790.

Braje, Todd, D.J. Kennett, J.M. Erlandson, & B. Culleton (2007) Human Impacts on Nearshore Shellfish Taxa: A 7,000 Year Record from Santa Rosa Island, California. American Antiquity 72:735–756.

Jones, T.L., R.T. Fitzgerald, D.J. Kennett, C. Micsicek, J. Fagan, J. Sharp, & J.M. Erlandson *2002 The Cross Creek Site (CA-SLO-1797) and its Implications for New World Colonization. American Antiquity 67:213–230.

Moss, Madonna L. & J.M. Erlandson (2002) Animal agency and coastal archaeology. American Antiquity 67:367-369. Erlandson, Jon M. & M.L. Moss (2001) Shellfish Eaters, Carrion Feeders, and the Archaeology of Aquatic Adaptations. American Antiquity 66:413–432.

Rick, Torben C., J.M. Erlandson, & R. Vellanoweth (2001) Paleocoastal Marine Fishing on the Pacific Coast of the Americas: Perspectives from Daisy Cave, California. American Antiquity 66:595–614.

Erlandson, Jon M. & Madonna L. Moss (1999) The Systematic Use of Radiocarbon Dating in Archaeological Surveys in Coastal and Other Erosional Environments. American Antiquity 64:431–443.

Connolly, Thomas, Jon M. Erlandson, & Susan E. Norris (1995) Early Holocene Basketry from Daisy Cave, San Miguel Island, California. American Antiquity 60:309–318.

Moss, Madonna L., Jon M. Erlandson, & Robert Stuckenrath (1989) The Antiquity of Tlingit Settlement on Admiralty Island, Southeast Alaska. American Antiquity 54(3):534–543.

Walker, Phillip L. & Jon M. Erlandson (1986) Dental Evidence for Prehistoric Dietary Change on the Northern Channel Islands, California. American Antiquity 50: 375–383.

== See also ==
- Coastal migration
