= On Your Knees Cave =

Cave in Alaska, United States

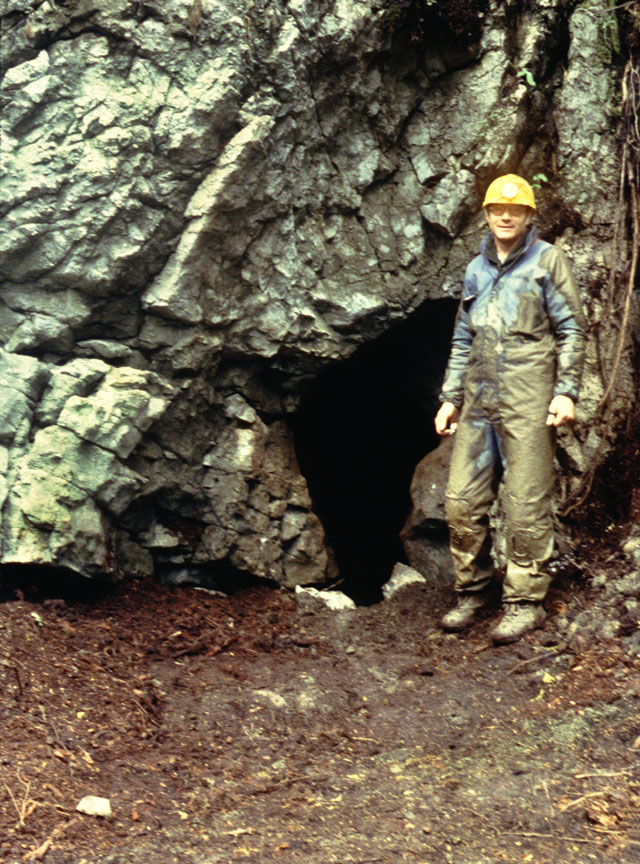
- Timothy H. Heaton at the entrance of On Your Knees Cave

- Location within Alaska
- 56°20′00″N 133°35′30″W
- Location: Prince of Wales Island, Alaska, United States

Site notes
- Archaeologists: Timothy H. Heaton
- Management: Tongass National Forest

On Your Knees Cave (49-PET-408) is an archaeological site located in southeastern Alaska (Prince of Wales Island). Human remains were found at the site in 1996 that dated between 9,730 ±60 and 9,880±50 radiocarbon YBP (Years Before Present) or a calendrical date of 10,300 YBP. In addition to human skeletal remains, stone tools and animal bones were discovered. DNA analyses performed on the human skeletal remains document the presence of mitochondrial haplogroup D which occurs widely in the Americas. Isotopic analysis indicated that the individual had a primarily marine based diet.

== Location ==
On Your Knees Cave is located on the northern tip of Prince of Wales Island within the Tongass National Forest. Its location is approximately one kilometer from the coast and 125 meters above sea level. Originally, the entrance of the cave was obstructed by large rocks and soil that had fallen from the cliff above, and covered with vegetation. After the obstructions were cleared, the small entrance later gave the cave its name. Inside is a long tunnel with an extremely low ceiling with old bear dens throughout.

== Discovery ==
The site was first discovered in 1993 by Kevin Allred and Mark Fritzke of the Tongass Cave Project, a joint cooperation between the Tongass National Forest and the National Speleological Society. Starting the following year, old bear dens within the cave were explored and numerous animal bones began to be found. Many different animal species were found during the excavations, including species now extinct on the island. After the discovery of animal bones in 1994, Timothy H. Heaton, paleontologist with the University of South Dakota-Vermillion at the time, led the research project, assisted in 1996 and after by Fred Grady with the Smithsonian Institution. Brian Kemp, a molecular anthropologist, and E. James Dixon assisted in the analyses. However, the discovery of human skeletal remains in 1996 changed the direction of the research project.

The human skeletal remains included a mandible with all but the incisors, partial remains of a right pelvis and other small fragments, 5 vertebrae, 3 maxillary incisors, and 1 maxillary canine. Stone tools were found among the animal and human bones. The stone tool material, obsidian, suggests trade or movement across water and land boundaries in the area.

== Significance ==
On Your Knees Cave is currently one of the earliest known settlements along the Northwest Coast of North America. DNA (deoxyribonucleic acid) was extracted from one of the individual's molars. The genetic analysis revealed that the individual, dubbed Shuká Káa (Tlingit: Man Ahead Of Us) was a male. Further examination of the teeth indicated that the man died in his mid-twenties. Through mitochondrial DNA (mtDNA), the individual was determined to be a member of a subgroup of haplogroup D, marking the earliest occurrence of this haplogroup. This haplogroup is found in populations along the western coast of the Americas. A tribal group in the area of the discovery, the Tlingit, submitted DNA samples to be compared to the On Your Knees Cave individual. However, no match was found, indicating that the individual and modern Alaska Native American tribes are likely not closely related, although this does not mean that ancient Alaskan Native American groups would not have been closely related to the individual.

Isotopic analyses conducted on the human skeletal remains revealed this individual's diet was almost entirely marine protein. This, given On Your Knees Cave's location on an island, suggests a maritime adaptation was present at an early time level in this region.

One hundred animal bones samples from On Your Knees Cave underwent carbon-14 dating and the results indicated that during the past 40,000 years there was almost continuous occupation and use of the cave by animals, indicating the island was never completely glaciated or uninhabitable during this interval. The stone tools that were found within the cave were made at the site, but not of materials known to be from the site such as obsidian. Some of this obsidian was sourced from the Mount Edziza volcanic complex in British Columbia, Canada, and is dubbed Edziza obsidian. Since the cave site is on an island and the lithic material was not known to the site, researchers have suggested that the individual and others at that time were mariners who could cross bodies of water by boats. The evidence from this site suggesting a marine based diet, extralocal artifacts, and a maritime adaptation supports a coastal migration model for the first Americans as proposed by K.R. Fladmark in 1979.

== NAGPRA and the human skeletal remains ==
In accordance with the Native American Graves Protection and Repatriation Act of 1990, excavations at On Your Knees Cave were halted after the discovery of human skeletal remains in 1996. After the discovery, Heaton and other project leaders contacted and began consulting with local tribal governments in the area to determine the ownership of the remains. The rightful ownership was deemed to belong to the Tlingit people in Southeastern Alaska. The Tlingit had their reservations about allowing scientists to test the remains, but finally agreed to analyses of the human bones and further excavation if they were notified of any additional discoveries. This led to a 12-year-long partnership between the Tlingit Native American tribe and the scientific community. After the human skeletal remains had been studied for a time, they were repatriated to the Tlingit people for a reburial and a celebration festival.

== Funding ==
The research at On-Your-Knees Cave was funded by the National Science Foundation, National Geographic Society, Tongass National Forest, University of South Dakota, and National Speleological Society.

== Documentary ==
A documentary, Kuwóot yas.éin (His Spirit Is Looking Out from the Cave), has been made by the Sealaska Heritage Institute.

== See also ==
- Coastal Migration
- National Speleological Society
- Paleo-Indians
- Settlement of the Americas
- Sealaska Corporation (the present Sealaska Heritage Institute)
- Tlingit people
- Tongass National Forest
- Triquet Island
