= Svarfdæla saga =

Icelandic saga

Svarfdæla saga (Old Norse: Svarfdœla saga [ˈswɑrvˌdøːlɑ ˈsɑɣɑ]; Icelandic pronunciation: [ˈsvarftaila ˈsaːɣa],) is one of the sagas of Icelanders. It was first recorded in the first half of the 14th century. It describes disputes which arise during the early settlement of Svarfaðardalur, a valley in central north Iceland.

The saga concerns three generations of a family originating in Norway. Thorstein Svarfað comes to Iceland from Namdalen with his youngest son Karl. Most of the saga is about Karl and his relationship with Ljótólf, the local chieftain (goði) .

== Other sources ==
- Rebecca Merkelbach, "The Coarsest and Worst of the Íslendinga Sagas': Approaching the Alterity of the 'Post-Classical' Sagas of Icelanders", in Margins, Monsters, Deviants: Alterities in Old Norse Literature and Culture, edited by Rebecca Merkelbach and Gwendolyne Knight, 101-127, Turnhout, Belgium: Brepols Publishers, 2020.
