= Santa Isabel Ixtapan =

Coordinates: 19°35′N 98°56′W

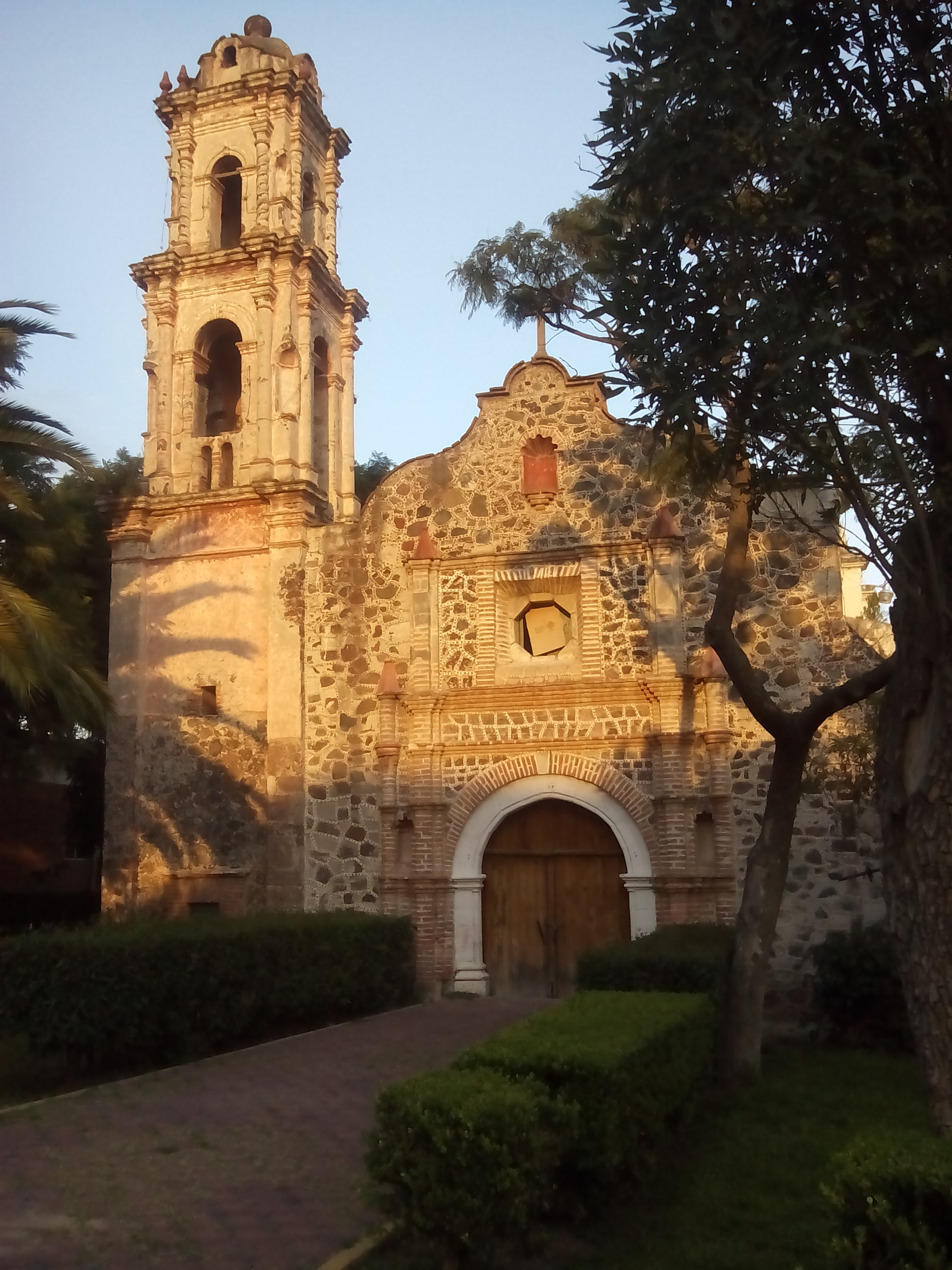
Iglesia de Santa Isabel Ixtapan.

Santa Isabel Ixtapan is a community which is part of the municipality of San Salvador Atenco in the State of Mexico, Mexico. It has 4,125 inhabitants and lies 2,240 meters above sea level.

The area is known for having one of the largest and best-studied mammoth kill sites in the Valley of Mexico.
