= Droplaugarsona saga =

Icelandic saga

Droplaugarsona saga is one of the Icelanders' sagas, probably written in the 13th century. The saga takes place near Lagarfljót in the east of Iceland about 1000 AD.

It tells the story of Grímr and Helgi, sons of the widow Droplaug, as grown men. Helgi is killed by Helgi Ásbjarnarsson. Grímr avenges his brother's death by killing Helgi Ásbjarnarsson. These are the same brothers who also appear in Fljótsdæla saga. Some of the storyline of Droplaugarsona saga overlaps with that of Fljótsdæla saga, although details often differ.
