= Fljótsdæla saga =

Icelandic saga

Fljótsdæla saga is one of the Icelandic sagas. It was probably the last one written, perhaps from the 1400s or 1500s. The text is known from several manuscripts which are from the early 1600s. It was probably written by an author in the east of Iceland and is a sequel to Hrafnkels saga.

The saga revolves around the lives and times of the residents of the Fljótsdalur region in Iceland, including Helge Åsbjørnsson (Helgi Ásbjarnarson) and of Grim (Grímr) and Helge (Helgi), two sons of the widow Droplaug, a pair of brothers who have their own saga, Droplaugarsona saga.

== Translations ==
- The Saga of the People of Fljotsdal. Translated by John Porter. In: Viðar Hreinsson (general editor): The Complete Sagas of Icelanders including 49 tales. (Reykjavík: Leifur Eiríksson Publishing, 1997. Vol. IV. pp. 379–433) ISBN 9979-9293-4-0.
- "Saga of the People of Fljotsdal (excerpt)", pp. 73–86 in Waggoner, Ben (2010). Sagas of Giants and Heroes. New Haven, CT: Troth Publications. ISBN 978-0578059334.
