= Triquet Island =

Island in British Columbia, Canada

- Location within British Columbia Location within Canada

Geography
- Location: Pacific Ocean, on Canada's southern west coast
- Coordinates: 51°48′N 128°15′W
- Area: 1.44 km^{2} (0.56 sq mi)
- Highest elevation: 49 m (161 ft)

Administration
- Canada
- Province: British Columbia

Demographics
- Population: 0

Triquet Island is an island off the west coast of British Columbia, Canada. It is south of Hunter and Campbell Islands facing the open Queen Charlotte Sound to the west. The island is administered as part of the Central Coast Regional District. The climate of the area is temperate. Average annual temperature is approximately 6.9 °C (44.4 °F).

An ancient village discovered in 2017 on Triquet Island by an archaeological team from the University of Victoria appears to verify local First Nation oral history that humans took refuge on Pacific Coast islands during the ice age. A hearth excavated at the site was determined by radiocarbon dating to be between 13,613 and 14,086 years old, making it one of the oldest firmly dated settlements in North America.

== See also ==
- Heiltsuk
- Waxvwuisaxv
- On Your Knees Cave
- Settlement of the Americas
