= Ljósvetninga saga =

Icelandic saga

Ljósvetninga saga is one of the sagas of Icelanders, commonly dated to the thirteenth century and takes place between the end of the tenth century to the mid-eleventh century in the North of Iceland. The saga's main character is Guðmundr inn ríki Eyjólfsson, a powerful chieftain from North-Iceland's Eyjafjörður district. In the early-twentieth century it was an important part of the freeprose-bookprose debate of the oral vs. literary origins of the sagas of Icelanders, due to its problematic manuscript transmission.

== Authorship and Dating ==
The author of the saga is unknown as the work is anonymous. Nevertheless, Icelandic scholar Barði Guðmundsson (1900-1957) argued that its author was Þórðr Þorvarðsson, an historically obscure son-in-law of thirteenth-century magnate and author Sturla Þórðarson. The saga's Íslenzk fornit editor has dated both version of the saga to mid-thirteenth century due mostly to its literary connections with Njáls saga and historical evidence, while its translators into English, Theodore Andersson and William Ian Miller, have suggested the earlier date of ca. 1220, based mostly on an oddly-placed reference to a historical character, and other literary connections.

== Manuscripts and Redactions ==
There are currently only two extant medieval manuscripts of Ljósvetninga saga, and both are fragmentary. A manuscript from ca. 1400 belonging to the Árni Magnússon Institute for Icelandic Studies, with the shelf-mark AM 561 4to, and another belonging to the same institute with shelf-mark AM 162 c fol. Of AM 561 4to there is only one nineteenth century paper copy which was made by Icelandic scholar Guðbrandur Vigfússon (1827–1889) and all other paper copies are of AM 162 c fo.

The differences between the two manuscripts are dramatic from a narrative point of view; the version in AM 561 4to, often referred to as the A-redaction, features a shorter narrative that omits stories that are to be found in the C-redaction extant in AM 162 c fol. and its paper copies. These differences were a cause for much debate about the saga's origins and over the redactions' primacy, with arguments regarding a literary vs. oral connection between the two.

== Synopsis ==
The story relates to the attempt Guðmundr and Thorgeir Ljosvetningagodi (Þorgeirr Ljósvetningagoði Þorkelsson) to comply with the demands of Haakon Jarl to shorten the lesser outlawry sentence of a quarrelsome youth. This sparks a dispute between these two chieftains and Thorgeir's sons, which is not quite resolved at the end. At this point the plot splits between the A-redaction and the C-redaction except for 3 chapters at the end of the A-version and C-version, which are almost identical.

The A-redaction moves on to tell of how Guðmundr avenges insults against his masculinity from the local chieftain Þórir Helgason and Thorgeir's son Þorkell, temporarily exiling the former and killing the latter. Its plot would have ended shortly after Þorkell's half-brother, Drauma-Finni, avenged his death.

The C-redaction tells about how Guðmundr gets involved in northeastern Icelandic politics through the unwanted marriage of his daughter, and his dealings with local strongmen Ófeigr Járngerðarson and Þorkell Geitisson. After these are resolved Guðmundr proceeds, like in the A-redaction, to fight with local chieftain Þórir Helgason and Þorgeirr's son Þorkell, leading to Þorkell's and subsequently Guðmundr's deaths. After Guðmundr dies, his son Eyjólfr goes on to contend with the offspring of Þorgeirr's sons, at the cost of his brother Koðrán's life, and further establishes himself as a follower of King Olaf Haraldsson.

== Other sources ==
- Theodore M. Andersson & William Ian Miller (1989) Law and literature in medieval Iceland: Ljósvetninga saga and Valla-Ljóts saga (Stanford University Press) ISBN 9780804715324
- Margaret Clunies Ross (2010) The Cambridge Introduction to the Old Norse-Icelandic Saga (Cambridge University Press) ISBN 9780521735209
- Viðar Hreinsson, ed (1997) The Complete Sagas of Icelanders, including 49 Tales (Leifur Eiriksson Publishing Ltd) ISBN 9789979929307
