= Sigurður Nordal =

Icelandic academic (1886–1974)

Sigurður Nordal (14 September 1886 – 21 September 1974) was an Icelandic scholar, writer, and ambassador. He was influential in forming the theory of the Icelandic sagas as works of literature composed by individual authors. (Note: Still, he did not throw the baby out with the bathwater. Earlier on people had believed the sagas to be accurate history. As is inevitable, there was a backlash, and many authors tended to believe that nothing was true and the sagas were at best a statement about the time they were written in. Nordal took the position, that every statement had to be examined on its own merits, as is obvious from his prologue to his edition of Egils saga.)

== Education ==
Nordal (Note: According to Icelandic custom he should be referred to as Sigurður. But a handful of individuals with a family name are referred to as such. Nordal was one of them. Another was Benedikt Gröndal.) studied Scandinavian Philology in Copenhagen where he received his MA in 1912. In 1914 he completed his doctoral thesis. He then went on to study philosophy in Berlin and Oxford.

== Career ==
In 1918 he became Professor of Icelandic Language and Literature at the University of Iceland. He retained this position until his death but was exempted from teaching duties in 1945. From 1931 to 1932 Nordal held the Charles Eliot Norton professorship at Harvard University. From 1951 to 1957 he was the Icelandic ambassador in Copenhagen. He was the editor-in-chief of the Íslenzk fornrit series from 1933 to 1951. In 1965, he coined the word "tölva" (a portmanteau made from tölu-völva / "numerical oracle") as the Icelandic word for "computer." His neologism would become the standard word.

Some of Sigurður Nordal's most influential works are:

- Völuspá: A treatise on the Eddic poem Völuspá, regarding the poem as a coherent work by one poet.
- Íslenzk menning ("Icelandic Culture"): Often considered Nordal's greatest work, this book was used as a standard text in Icelandic colleges.
- Hrafnkatla: A treatise on Hrafnkels saga, aiming to establish that the saga was a fictional work of art.
- Samhengið í íslenzkum bókmenntum ("The Continuity of Icelandic Literature").
- Fyrirlestrar um íslenzka bókmenntasögu 1350-1750 ("Lectures on the History of Icelandic Literature 1350-1750"): (Note: The lectures were not published until after the author's death, and only a small part of them is to be found in his manuscripts. The published version is mostly based on meticulous, typewritten notes by Finnur Sigmundsson. But Nordal knew of these notes, and in some cases added to them. The whole discussion can be found in the 10. volume of his collected works, Samhengi og samtíð I.) (Note: Fyrirlestrar um íslenzka bókmenntasögu and Samhengið í íslenzkum bókmenntum aimed to establish that there was no gap in Icelandic literature, between the medieval literature and the 19th century romantic works.)

"In the 1920s, there was a rumour that Kvaran was considered for the Nobel Prize in Literature, but in response Sigurður Nordal disparaged him as overly focused on forgiveness and thus tolerant of things that should rather be opposed; in the spirit of Icelandic nationalism and contemporary interpretations of Nietzsche, he considered the blood feud a better ethical mode."

Sigurður Nordal also published three very influential anthologies: Íslenzk lestrarbók, 1400-1901 (1924), Íslenzk lestrarbók 1750-1930 (1st ed. 1975) and Sýnisbók íslenzkra bókmennta til miðrar átjándu aldar (1953), the latter one in collaboration with Guðrún P. Helgadóttir and Jón Jóhannesson. They deserve mention since they were required reading in Icelandic gymnasia for the better part of a century.
