= Jesse Byock =

American historian

Jesse L. Byock (born 1945) is Professor of Old Norse and Medieval Scandinavian Studies in the Scandinavian Section at the University of California, Los Angeles (UCLA).

== Career ==
He received his Ph.D. from Harvard University. An archaeologist and specialist in the archaeology, history and language of the Viking Age, he is professor at UCLA’s Cotsen Institute of Archaeology.

In Iceland, Prof. Byock is the Head Archaeologist and Director of the Mosfell Archaeological Project, excavating a Viking Age valley described in the medieval sagas and written sources. The Mosfell excavations include a large well-preserved chieftain’s hall, Christian and pagan burial sites, a conversion-age stave church, and a harbor from the first centuries of Iceland’s settlement during the Viking Age.

Jesse Byock is also affiliated Professor at the University of Iceland (Háskóli Íslands) in the Department of History and the Programs in Medieval Icelandic and Viking Studies, where he teaches courses in Old Norse and the history, archaeology, sagas and sources of Viking Age and Medieval Iceland.

== Archaeological Field Project ==
Byock has worked at the Mosfell Archaeological Project, an archaeologically rich environment, including the excavation of a viking long house, chieftain's hall, and pagan and Christian burial yards.

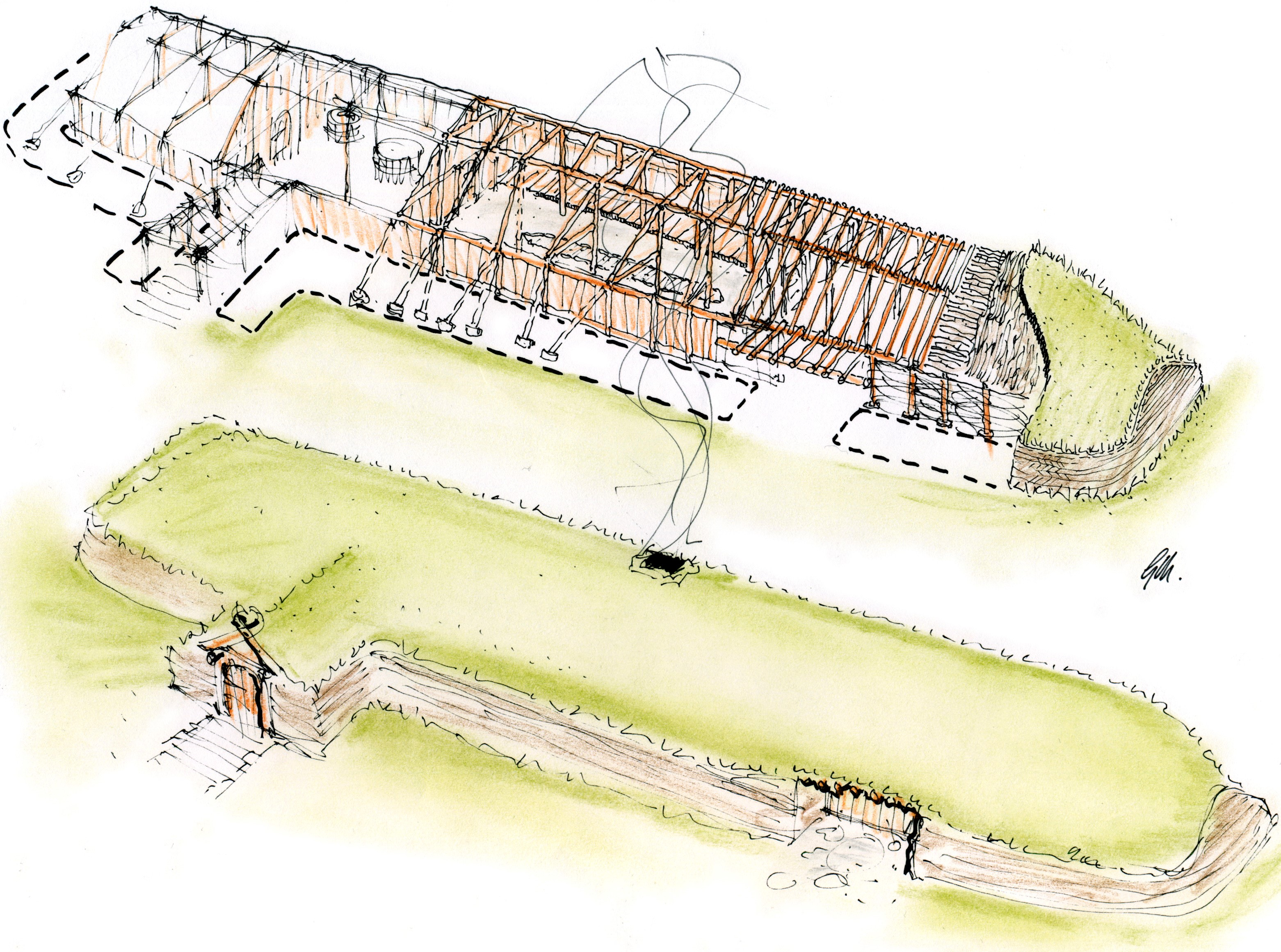
The Long House of the Mosfell Chieftains, the first building phase ca. 900.

The Mosfell Valley and Mosfellsbær lie within the greater Reykjavik area.

== Notable Books ==
- Viking archaeology in Iceland : Mosfell archaeological project. Turnhout, Belgium: Brepols. 2014. ISBN 978-2-503-54400-7.
- Viking Language 1, 2nd Edition: Learn Old Norse, Runes, and Icelandic Sagas
- Viking Language 2: The Old Norse Reader
- Viking Age Iceland
- (in French) L’Islande des Vikings
- (in Italian) La stirpe di Odino: La civiltà vichinga in Islanda

== Documentary Film and Multimedia ==
- Ari Trausti and Jesse Byock. Fornleirfar Tala: Höfðingjar í Mosfellsdal (‘Archaeologists Talk: Chieftains in the Mosfells Valley’) Icelandic TV documentary, 2015
- Byock, Jesse. “The Lore of the Ring” (2005). BBC Radio 3 and BBC World Service. Radio essay to accompany the New York Metropolitan Opera’s rendition of Richard Wagner’s Ring Cycle. Repeatedly aired 2005 – 2013
- Byock, Jesse and Stephen Ross. A Viking Landscape. (2004). Ross Films, Documentary about the Mosfell Archaeological Project.
- “The Vikings: Fury From the North.” (2001). Jesse Byock, Historical consultant on the Vikings for the History Channel.
- “Leif Eiriksson – The Man Who Almost Changed History.” (2000). Jesse Byock, Specialist narrator for documentary film for Public Television, Ward Television, Smithsonian Institution for the Year 2000 Viking Exhibition.
- “Vikings: The Saga.” (2000). Jesse Byock, Specialist narrator for documentary film for Smithsonian Institution. Year 2000 Viking Exhibition.
- “Leif Eriksson.” (1995). Jesse Byock, Specialist narrator for documentary film, Arts and Entertainment series, Biography.
- “Vikings in America.” (1995). Jesse Byock, Specialist narrator for documentary film, The History Channel.
- Ulin, D., and Byock, J. “Medicine and Viking Disease.” (1995). An episode in the series, A Moment of Science for National Public Radio.
- “Evidence of the Vikings.” (1995). BBC film for the historical documentary series, Timewatch on British Television. Jesse Byock, Principal historical consultant, heading the research and involved in the script writing, shooting, narrating, and clipping.
