= Childe Rowland =

Fairy tale

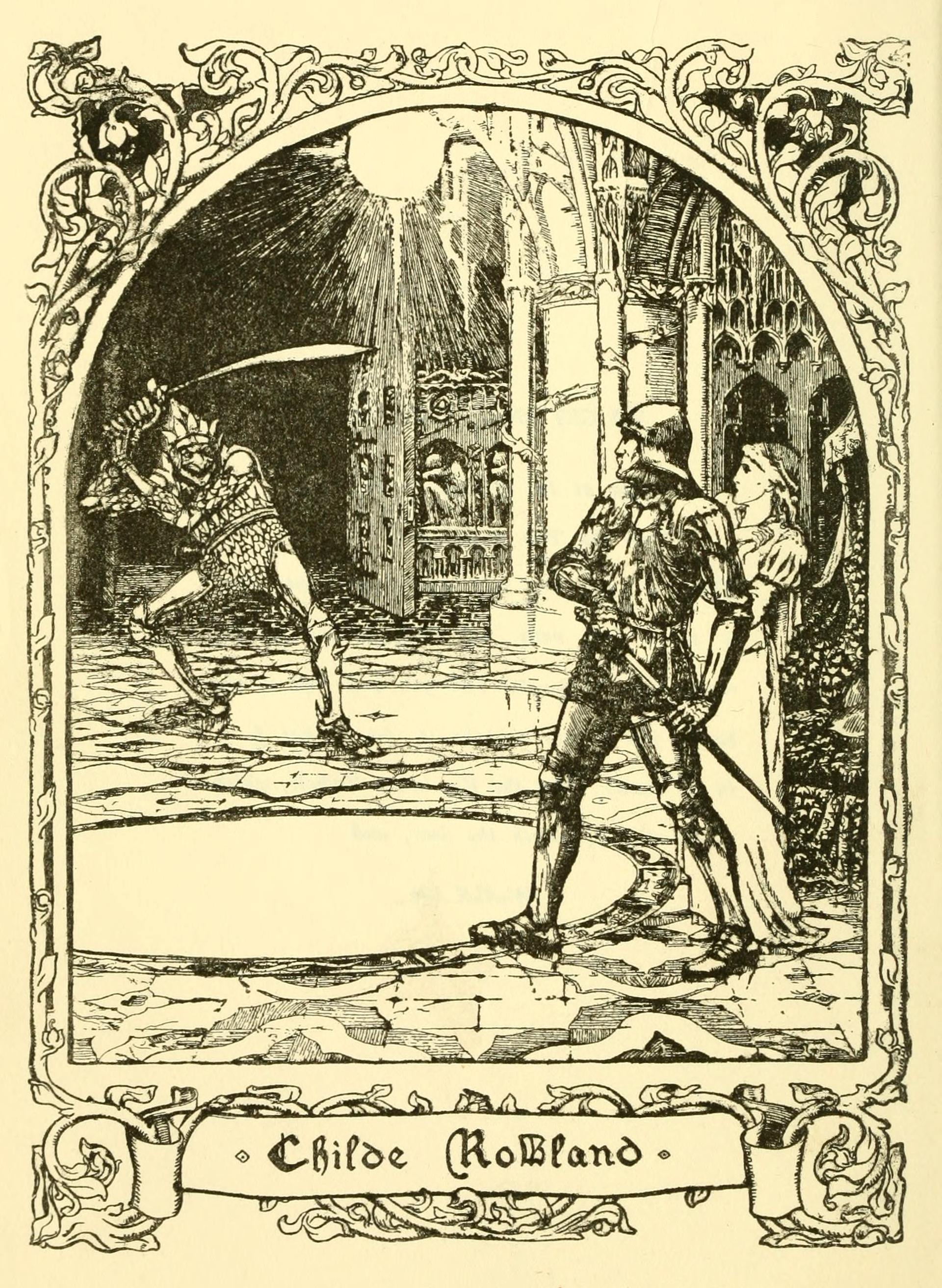
Childe Rowland draws his sword to fight the Elf King, in this 1902 illustration by John Dickson Batten

Childe Rowland is a fairy tale, the most popular version written by Joseph Jacobs in his English Fairy Tales, published in 1890, based on an earlier version published in 1814 by Robert Jamieson. Jamieson's was repeating a "Scottish ballad", which he had heard from a tailor.

Joseph Jacobs called the King of Elfland's palace "the Dark Tower" in his version, an addition he made that was not part of the original ballad. This harks to Shakespeare's King Lear and Robert Browning's poem "Childe Roland to the Dark Tower Came".

It is Aarne-Thompson-Uther type 312D, "Rescue by the Brother."

== Synopsis ==
The story tells of how the four children of the Queen (by some accounts Guinevere), Childe Rowland, his two older brothers, and his sister, Burd Ellen, were playing ball near a church. Rowland kicked the ball over the church and Burd Ellen went to retrieve it, inadvertently circling the church "widdershins", or opposite the way of the sun, and disappeared. Rowland went to Merlin to ask what became of his sister and was told that she was taken to the Dark Tower by the King of Elfland, and only the boldest knight in Christendom could retrieve her.

The eldest brother decided he would make the journey, and was told what to do by Merlin. He did not return, and the middle brother followed, only to meet the same fate. Finally Childe Rowland went forth, having been given his father's sword, which never struck in vain, for protection. Merlin gave him his orders: he must chop off the head of anyone in Elfland who speaks to him until he sees his sister, and he must not eat or drink anything while in that realm. Rowland obeyed the orders, dispatching a horseherd, a cowherd, and a henwife, who would not tell him where his sister was. The henwife would only say he had to circle a hill three times widdershins, and say each time "Open, door! open, door! And let me come in." Following the instructions, a door opened in the hill and Rowland entered a great hall, where sat Burd Ellen, under the spell of the King of Elfland. She told him he should not have entered Elfland, for misfortune befell all who did, including their brothers, who were prisoners in the Dark Tower, nearly dead.

Rowland, forgetting Merlin's words, was overcome with hunger and asked his sister for food. Unable to warn him, she complied. At the last moment, Merlin's words returned to Rowland and he threw down the food, upon which the King of Elfland burst into the hall. Rowland fought with the King, and with the aid of his father's sword beat him into submission. The King begged for mercy, and Rowland granted it, provided his siblings were released. They returned home together, and Burd Ellen never circled the church widdershins again.

In the version given by F. A. Steel in her English Fairy Tales, originally published in 1918 (republished by Macmillan in 2016), when Rowland finds Burd Helen, or at least an enchanted version of her, and she speaks to him, he remembers Merlin's instructions and cuts her head off, which brings back the real Burd Helen. This explains why the first two brothers had not returned; they could not bring themselves to cut off her head, and had become enchanted themselves.

== History ==
Joseph Jacobs's version was based on that of Robert Jamieson in Illustrations of Northern Antiquities, published in 1814. Jamieson had heard it from a tailor.

Jamieson compared the narrative to the Danish ballads about Rosmer Halfmand from the 1695 work Kaempe Viser. There were three ballads about Rosmer, who was a giant or merman, stealing a girl whose brother later rescues her. In the first, the characters are the children of Lady Hillers of Denmark, and the sister is named Svanè. In the second, the main characters are Roland and Proud Eline lyle. In the third, the hero is Child Aller, son of the king of Iceland. Unlike the English Roland, the hero of the Danish ballads relies on trickery to rescue his sister, and in some versions they have an incestuous relationship.

Jamieson also compared the story to the ballad of "The Merman and Marstig's Daughter," where a merman steals a young woman from a church. Other narratives where brothers seek a missing sister are The Old Wives' Tale and Milton's Comus.

== Cultural influences ==
Jacobs's version is predated by the "Childe Rowland" reference in King Lear, and by Robert Browning's 1855 poem Childe Roland to the Dark Tower Came. Browning's poem has inspired other works such as Gordon R. Dickson's unfinished science fiction series Childe Cycle (1959) and Stephen King's Dark Tower series.

Jacobs's tale may itself have been the inspiration for a number of modern works, but it is difficult to distinguish this from the reception of Browning's poem.

- Lord Dunsany's 1924 novel The King of Elfland's Daughter shares many similarities with the story.
- Louis MacNeice wrote a radio play, The Dark Tower, based on the Childe Rowland story. The play was first broadcast on the BBC Home Service (now Radio 4) on 26 January 1946. The original music was composed by Benjamin Britten.
- Alan Garner drew heavily on the tale for his novel Elidor (1965), using it as the start of his story.
- Andre Norton retold the fairy tale in her novel Warlock of the Witch World (1967).
- English folk singer Martin Carthy used an adaptation of the tale for the basis of his song Jack Rowland, which appeared on his 1982 album
- Stephen King's book series "The Dark Tower" is heavily inspired by this tale.
- Out of the Cut (Martin Carthy album)
- Terry Pratchett's The Wee Free Men (2003) introduces a character named Roland de Chumsfanleigh, who is kidnapped by the Queen of the Elves.

== In subsequent culture ==
The story of Childe Roland is given prominence in Harper Lee's initial draft of To Kill a Mockingbird, later published under the title Go Set a Watchman, in which 26-year-old "Scout" seeks to understand a Victorian scholar, her Uncle Jack, regarding the South's status in the 1950s.

In Book 2 of Seanan Mcguire's Indexing series, the prison used to hold rougue fairy tale characters is named Childe.

== See also ==
- Tam Lin – Scottish border ballad
- Thomas the Rhymer – 13th-century Scottish laird and reputed prophet from Earlston
- Song of Roland – 11th-century French epic poem
