= Robert Jamieson (antiquary) =

Scottish antiquarian

Robert Jamieson (1772 – 24 September 1844) was a Scottish antiquarian.

He was born in Moray. In 1806 he published a collection of 149 traditional ballads and songs, along with two pleasing lyrics of his own, entitled Popular Ballads And Songs From Tradition, Manuscripts And Scarce Editions With Translations Of Similar Pieces From The Ancient Danish Language.

Walter Scott, through whose assistance he received a government post at Edinburgh, held Jamieson in high esteem and pointed out his skill in discovering the connection between Scandinavian and Scottish legends. Scott also published some of Jamieson's translations, such as The Ghaist's Warning in the notes to The Lady of the Lake. Jamieson's work preserved much oral tradition which might otherwise have been lost. He was associated with Henry Weber and Scott in Illustrations of Northern Antiquities (1814), and edited Burt's Letters from Scotland with Scott in 1818.
