= Sunwise =

Clockwise

Sunwise, sunward or deasil (sometimes spelled deosil), are terms meaning to go clockwise or in the direction of the sun, as seen from the Northern Hemisphere. The opposite term is widdershins (Middle Low German), or tuathal (Scottish Gaelic). In Scottish culture, this turning direction is also considered auspicious, while the converse is true for counter-clockwise motion.

== Irish culture ==
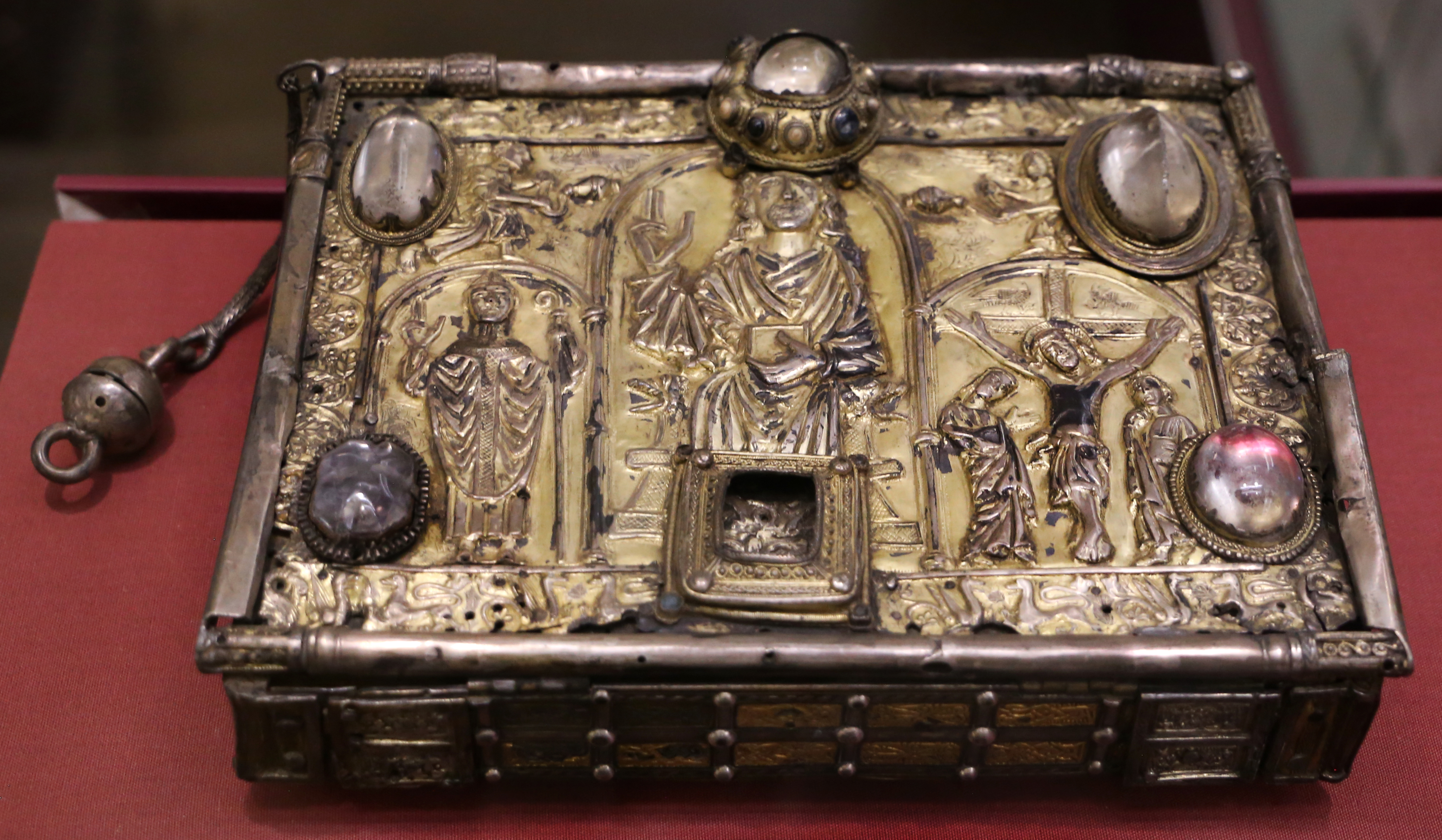
The Cumdach of the Cathach of St. Columba.

During the days of Gaelic Ireland and of the Irish clans, the Psalter known as An Cathach was used as both a rallying cry and protector in battle by the Chiefs of Clan O'Donnell. Before a battle it was customary for a chosen monk or holy man (usually attached to the Clan McGroarty and who was in a state of grace) to wear the Cathach and the cumdach, or book shrine, around his neck and then walk three times sunwise around the warriors of Clan O'Donnell.

According to folklorist Kevin Danaher, on St. John's Eve in Ulster and Connaught, it was customary to light a bonfire at sunset and to walk sunwise around the fire while praying the rosary. Those who could not afford a rosary would keep tally by holding a small pebble during each prayer and throwing it into the bonfire as each prayer was completed.

Similar praying of the rosary or other similar prayers while walking sunwise around Christian pilgrimage shrines or holy wells is also traditional in Irish culture during pattern days.

== Scottish culture ==
This is descriptive of the ceremony observed by the druids, of walking round their temples by the south, in the course of their directions, always keeping their temples on their right. This course (diasil or deiseal) was deemed propitious, while the contrary course is perceived as fatal, or at least unpropitious. From this ancient superstition are derived several Gaelic customs which were still observed around the turn of the twentieth century, such as drinking over the left thumb, as Toland expresses it, or according to the course of the sun.

Similarly to the pre-battle use of the Cathach of St. Columba in Gaelic Ireland, the Brecbannoch of St Columba, a reliquary containing the partial human remains of the Saint, was traditionally carried three times sunwise around Scottish armies before they gave battle. The most famous example of this was during the Scottish Wars of Independence, shortly before the Scots under Robert the Bruce faced the English army at the Battle of Bannockburn in 1314.

Martin Martin says:

Some of the poorer sort of people in the Western Isles retain the custom of performing these circles sunwise about the persons of their benefactors three times, when they bless them, and wish good success to all their enterprises. Some are very careful when they set out to sea, that the boat be first rowed sunwise, and if this be neglected, they are afraid their voyage may prove unfortunate. I had this ceremony paid me when in Islay by a poor woman, after I had given her an alms. I desired her to let alone that compliment, for that I did not care for it; but she insisted to make these three ordinary turns, and then prayed that God and MacCharmaig, the patron saint of the island, might bless and prosper me in all my affairs. When a Gael goes to drink out of a consecrated fountain, he approaches it by going round the place from east to west, and at funerals, the procession observes the same direction in drawing near the grave. Hence also is derived the old custom of describing sunwise a circle, with a burning brand, about houses, cattle, corn and corn-fields, to prevent their being burnt or in any way injured by evil spirits, or by witchcraft. The fiery circle was also made around women, as soon as possible after parturition, and also around newly-born babes. These circles were, in later times, described by midwives, and were described effectual against the intrusion of ‘daoine-sìth’ or ‘sìthichean’, who were particularly on the alert in times of childhood, and not infrequently carried infants away, according to vulgar legends, and restored them afterwards, but sadly altered in features and personal appearance. Infants stolen by fairies are said to have voracious appetites, constantly craving for food. In this case it was usual for those who believed their children had been taken away, to dig a grave in the fields on quarter-day and there to lay the fairy skeleton till next morning, at which time the parents went to the place, where they doubted not to find their own child in place of the skeleton.

The use of the sunwise circle was also traditional in the Highlands during Christian pilgrimages in honour of St Máel Ruba, particularly to the shrine where he is said to have established a hermitage upon Isle Maree.

== "Deosil" and other spellings ==
Wicca uses the spelling deosil, which violates the Gaelic orthography principle that a consonant must be surrounded by either broad vowels (a, o, u) or slender vowels (e, i). The Oxford English Dictionary gives precedence to the spelling "deasil", which violates the same principle, but acknowledges "deiseal", "deisal", and "deisul" as well.

== Other cultures ==
This distinction exists in traditional Tibetan religion. Tibetan Buddhists go round their shrines sunwise, but followers of Bonpo go widdershins. The former consider Bonpo to be merely a perversion of their practice, but Bonpo adherents claim that their religion, as the indigenous one of Tibet, was doing this prior to the arrival of Buddhism in the country.

The Hindu pradakshina, the auspicious circumambulation of a temple, is also made clockwise.

== See also ==
- Circumambulation

== Sources ==
- (Deiseal)
