= Eyrbyggja saga =

Icelandic saga

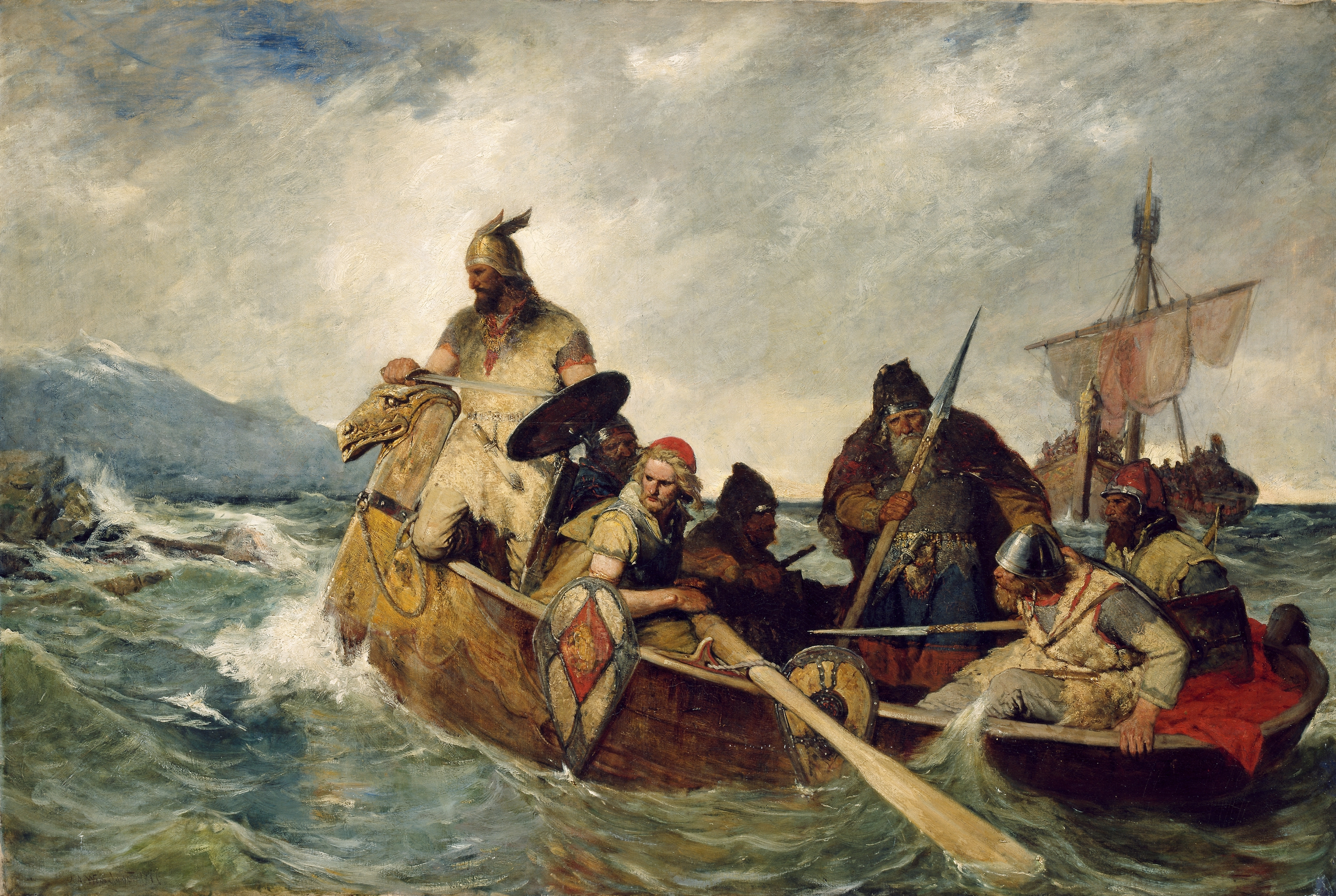
- Norsemen Landing in Iceland, by Oscar Arnold Wergeland, 1877
- Author: Anonymous
- Translator: Paul Edwards, Hermann Palsson, William Morris, Eirikr Magnusson
- Language: Icelandic, Old Norse
- Genre: Icelandic Saga, Icelandic literature
- Publication date: 13th to 14th Century
- Publication place: Iceland

Eyrbyggja saga (Old Norse pronunciation: [ˈœyrˌbyɡːjɑ ˈsɑɣɑ]; Icelandic pronunciation: [ˈeirˌpɪcːa ˈsaːɣa]) is one of the Icelanders' sagas; its title can be translated as The Saga of the People of Eyri. It was written by an anonymous writer, who describes a long-standing feud between Snorri Goði and Arnkel Goði, two strong chieftains in the Norse community that settled in Iceland. The title is slightly misleading as it deals also with the clans from Þórsnes and Álftafjörðr on Iceland. The most central character is Snorri Þorgrímsson, referred to as Snorri Goði and Snorri the Priest. Snorri was the nephew of the hero of Gísla saga, and is also featured prominently in Njáls saga and Laxdæla saga. Another main interest of the Eyrbyggja Saga is to trace a few key families as they settled Iceland, specifically around the Snæfellsnes peninsula.

The Saga is usually not regarded as artistically equal to Egil's saga, Njáls saga and Laxdæla saga. Nevertheless, it is valued for many reasons, including its historical and folkloric elements. The saga is characterized by a distinct interest in old lore, rituals, pagan practices and superstitions. The saga includes several references to the colonization of Greenland and one reference to an expedition to Vinland. It also mentions a journey by Guðleifr Guðlaugsson and his crew to Great Ireland, which was said to exist beyond Vinland.

Sections of the Eyrbyggja Saga have survived in fragments from the 13th century and in numerous manuscripts from the 14th century.

== Synopsis ==
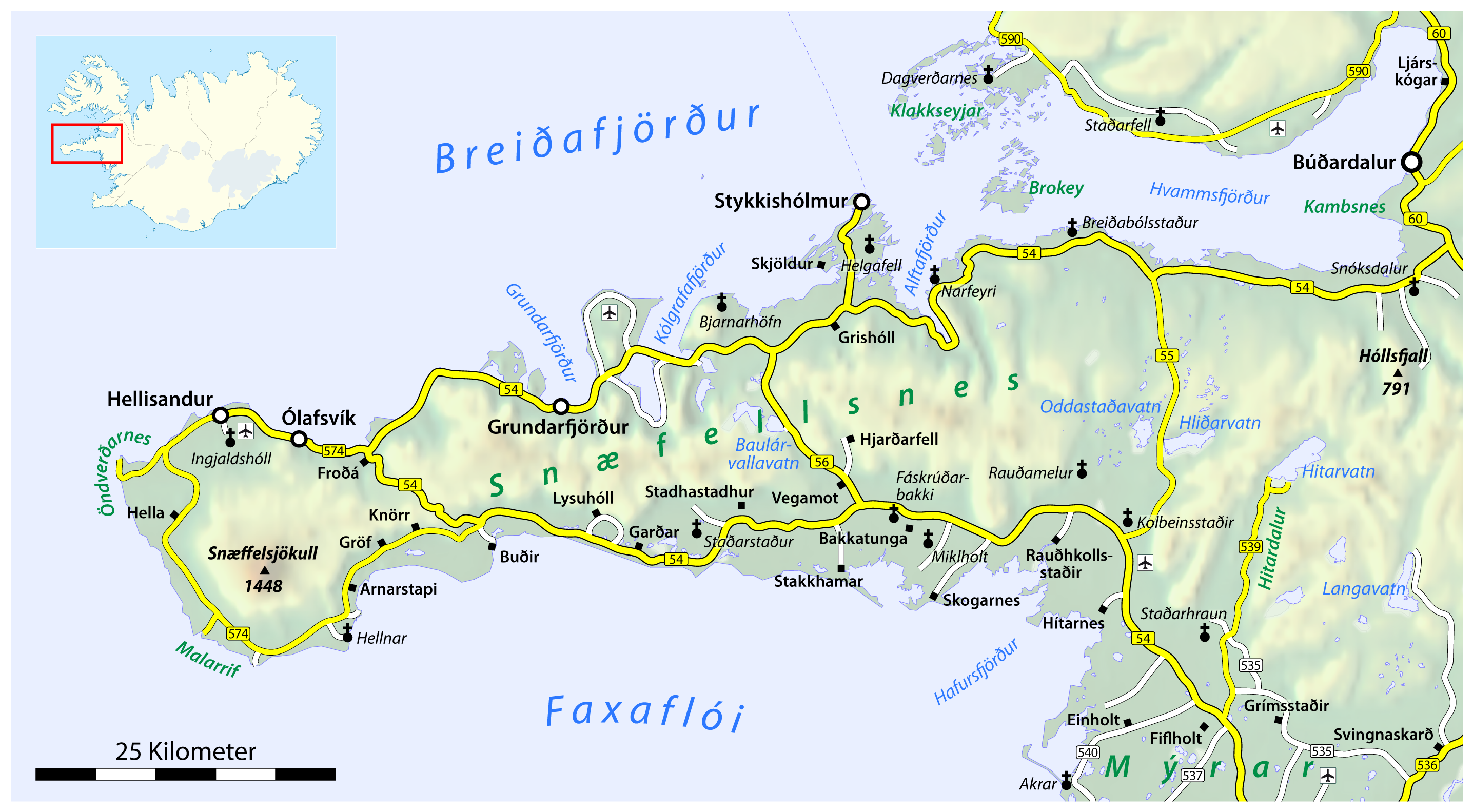
Modern day map of Snæfellsnes

The Saga portrays the different families and individuals living on Iceland at Snæfellsnes. There is constant fighting between the different clans on Snæfellsnes, mostly over resources such as wood, property, and livestock. The different Norsemen represented in the Saga constantly turn to Snorri and Arnkel for advice and permission to take legal and/or physical action against perpetrators that have wronged them.

The story of the Eyrbyggja Saga frequently turns on actions that stem from greed, fear, ambition or downright meanness, as it describes cold-hearted bargaining between farmers and chieftains. All of the events of the Saga take place in one small region of Snæfellsnes, shifting between Álptafjord, which cuts into the northern shore of the peninsula, and Helgafell, the farmstead on Thórsnes, where Snorri Goði resided. The Saga shows a steady shift from paganism on Iceland to Christianity over the course of roughly twenty years.

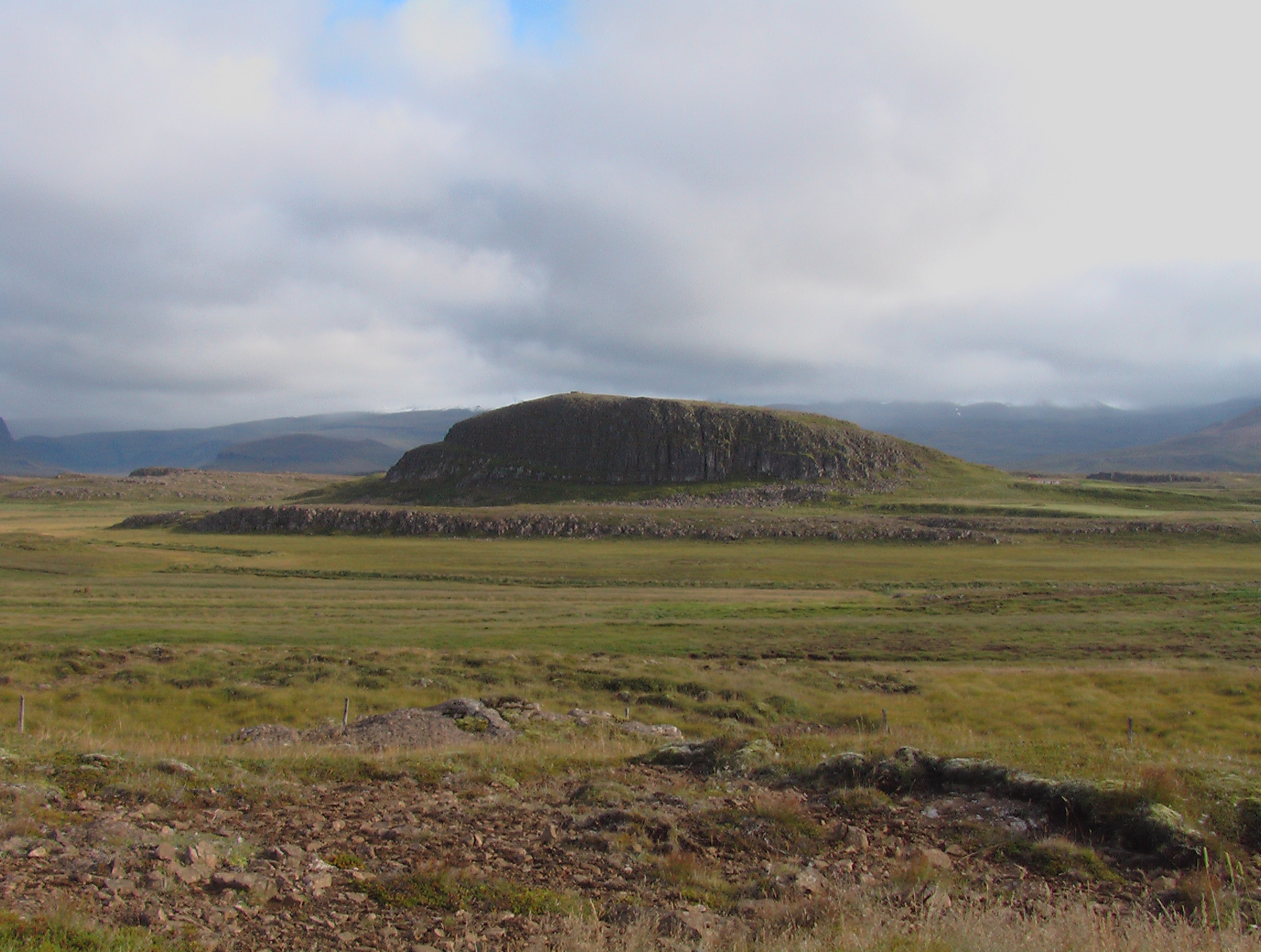
Modern day Helgafell

The saga was most likely written in its entirety in the mid- or late-13th century, but historians have not yet been able to pinpoint an exact date. The narrative begins at the time of the Norse settlement in Iceland as early as the 9th century, but most of the events take place towards the end of the 10th century and the early 11th century. There is also internal evidence that the author of the saga knew of Laxdæla saga and Egils saga.

As is the case with all Icelander sagas, Eyrbyggja Saga should not be taken as a reliable historical record, but as a narrative with a basis in oral family history. Many of the places, events, and people are quite real, but the story includes fantastical episodes with elements of folklore, including sorcery, possessed livestock, and revenants. Although the goði Arnkel, who is a kind of tragic hero in the saga, is praised above any other character (að hann hefir verið allra menna best að sér um alla hluti í fornum sið og manna vitrastur, ch. 37), the author tends to focus on Arnkel's ultimately more successful rival Snorri, who was not only an early champion of Christianity on Snæfellsnes but also an ancestor of the Sturlung family, who dominated Icelandic politics in the first half of the 13th century.

== Overview ==
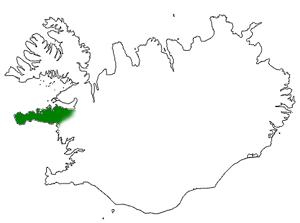
Snæfellsnes is a peninsula in western Iceland.

- Government
  - Eyrbyggja Saga shows the Norse system of legalities on Snæfellsnes which used a trial by jury system. There was normally a local chieftain who oversaw property boundaries, settled disputes between landlords and blood feuds, and prosecuted criminals. Snorri Goði, in particular, was the head chieftain on Snæfellsnes and dealt with local disputes over firewood, blood feuds, and property distribution. Snorri is also seen putting ghosts on trial for their hauntings. Chapter 55 of the Saga shows Snorri and his nephew Kiartan summoning Thorir Wooden-leg and other ghosts with coming and going about Frodis-water without permission and despoiling men of their lives and good fortune. These trials brought an end to the hauntings that occurred at Frodis-water.
- Women
  - Women represented in the Saga are prominent and strong-willed characters. They could own property, become merchants, court their own marriages, and command legions of sailors. For example, Geirrid, the sister of Geirrod of Ere, had workers build her a large vestibule hallway in which she could examine all the men that passed by in attempts to find a future husband.
- Death ritual
  - The Saga shows that, upon death, a hole was cut in the wall closest to where the corpse was and the body was removed from the house through the hole. It was believed that, if a dead person was carried through the front door, their ghost would remember how to enter and exit the house and come back to haunt the house.
- Religion
  - The Saga shows a strong shift from Paganism to Christianity. After Christianity had been officially adopted by the Althing, Snorri Goði and several other important men of Snæfellsnes had churches built on their land, although there were no priests to be had to celebrate mass. It is unclear how many Norsemen actually converted from Norse paganism to Christianity. Archaeological evidence suggests that Pagan and Christian burials took place on Iceland, specifically on Snæfellsnes. Many Icelandic Norsemen were baptized and called themselves Christians, but little of their old Pagan rituals and beliefs had been abandoned; for example, cremating a corpse and drinking heavily after a funeral were pagan rituals.

== Prominent characters ==
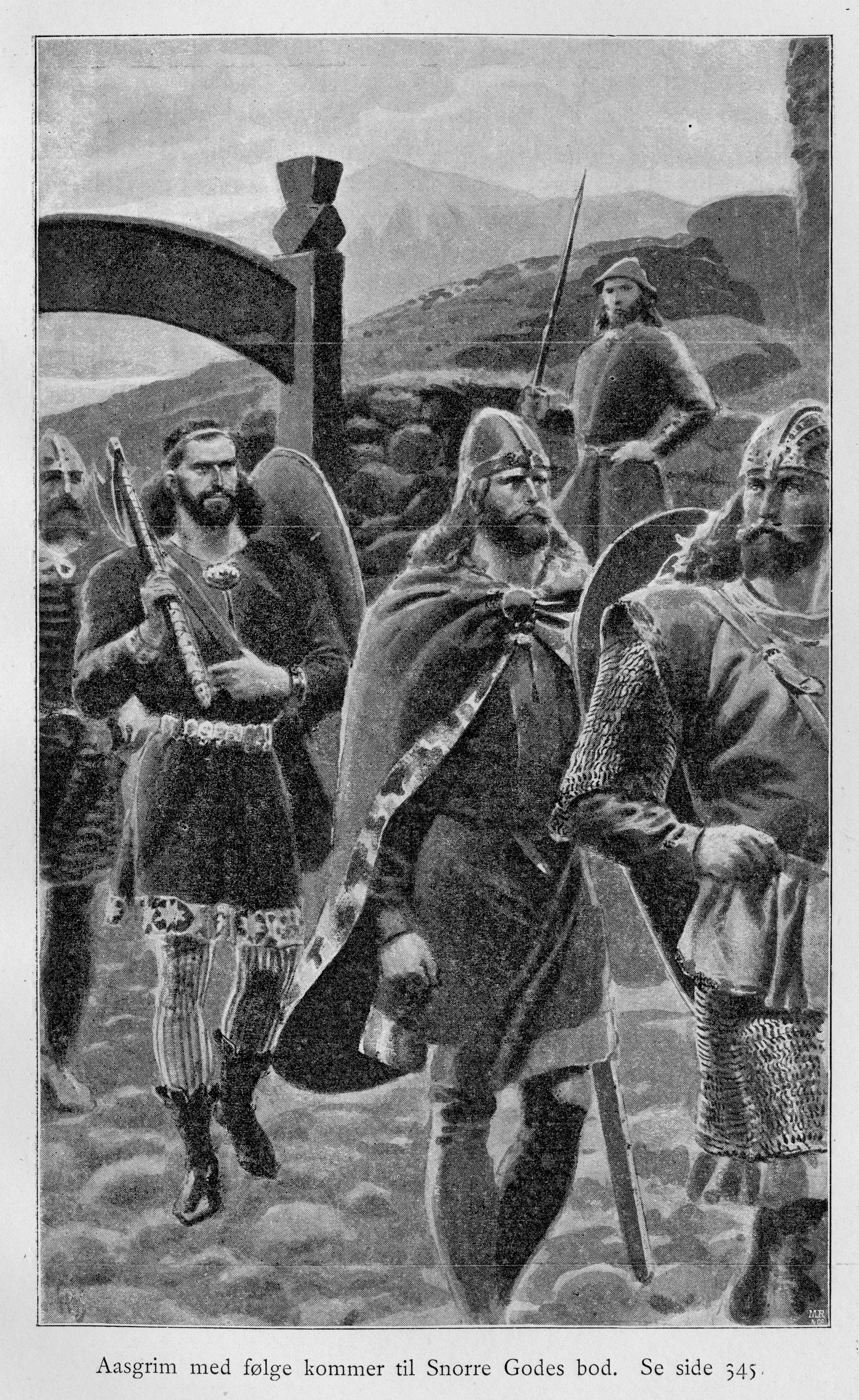
An illustrated recreation of Snorri Goði, by Andreas Bloch in 1898, titled Asgrim and his retinue come to Snorri Goði's booth, an event that was featured in the Njáls saga

=== Snorri Goði ===
Snorri acted as the chieftain of Snæfellsnes, and the author constantly depicts him as the wise, classical hero. The Saga's main area of focus is featured around his life. Snorri also converted to Christianity and declared Christianity the official religion of Iceland. He permitted the construction of Christian churches around Snæfellsnes.

Snorri was middling in height and somewhat slender, fair to look on, straight faced and of light hue; of yellow hair and red beard; he was meek of mood in his daily ways; little men knew of his thought for good or ill; he was a wise man, and forseeing in many things, enduring in wrath and deep in hatred; of good rede was he for his friends, but his unfriends deemed his counsels but cold.

— Eyrbyggja Saga chapter 15

In chapter 37, Snorri and his foster brothers kill Arnkel whilst he is working on his farm. In the ensuing court case regarding the murder of Arnkel, only Thorleif Thorbrandsson (Þorbrandsson) was convicted and outlawed. Snorri, after killing Arnkel, later sided with his foster brothers, the Thorbrandssons (Þorbrandssons), in their feud with the Thorlaksson family. He took part in the battle of Alftafjord with his foster brothers and rescued them after they were all wounded at the battle of Vigrafjord. A compromise was later reached between the two families, after Snorri courted his daughter with the son of Thormod Thorlaksson. Snorri also made an attempt to kill Bjorn Asbrandsson, who had an affair with his sister Thurid while she was married to Thorodd the Tribute Trader, a marriage that Snorri helped to arrange. Bjorn fended off Snorri's attack, but was later convinced to leave Iceland.

Snorri in his later years successfully led a fight against Ospak Kjallaksson, a Norseman who had assembled a group of men that constantly attacked and pillaged his neighbors. Snorri and his gang killed Ospak and the other members of his group. Snorri spared Ospak's son and allowed him to inherit his father's farm. Snorri had several children and was able to create marriage alliances with many leading families in Iceland. Snorri's descendants included the Sturlungs, through his son Halldor.

=== Arnkel ===
Arnkel, like Snorri, acted as chieftain over the peoples of Holyfell, and was also referred to as Arnkel the Priest. He is often depicted as the enemy of Snorri by the author. Arnkel provides similar information to the Norse living on Iceland on such matters as property rights and blood feuds. Arnkel became involved in further disputes with Snorri after Arnkel's father, Thorolf Halt-foot, accused Snorri of stealing his firewood. As the Saga progresses, Arnkel claims properties around Snæfellsnes, in which he also claims land from peoples who he presided over.

Arnkel finally engages in a physical dispute with Snorri and the Thorbrandssons (Þorbrandsson), Snorri's foster brothers. Snorri and his foster brothers attack and kill Arnkel whilst he was working on his farm.

Arnkel had laid his sword and shield against a hayrick, and now he took up his weapons and defended himself therewith; but now he began to gather wounds, and withal they came up into the garth about him. Then Arnkel leapt up on to the hayrick, and defended himself thence for a space, but such was the end of matter that he fell, and they covered him over there in the garth with hay; and thereafter Snorri and his folk fared home to Holyfell.

— Eyrbyggja Saga

=== Erik the Red ===
The Saga reveals Erik the Red's discovery of Greenland. He stayed there for three winters, returned to Iceland for a winter, and then returned to settle permanently in Greenland. The saga does not give a specific time of when this took place, but it does suggest that it was fourteen years before Snorri declared Christianity the official religion of Snæfellsnes.

== Ghost tales in the Saga ==
Eyrbyggja Saga describes numerous supernatural events that mainly consist of undead animals rising up through the floor and Draugrs coming into the house to warm themselves by the fire. The Draugrs in the Saga have a mixture of characteristics that are "typical" of Norse ghosts.

=== Thorolf Halt-Foot ===
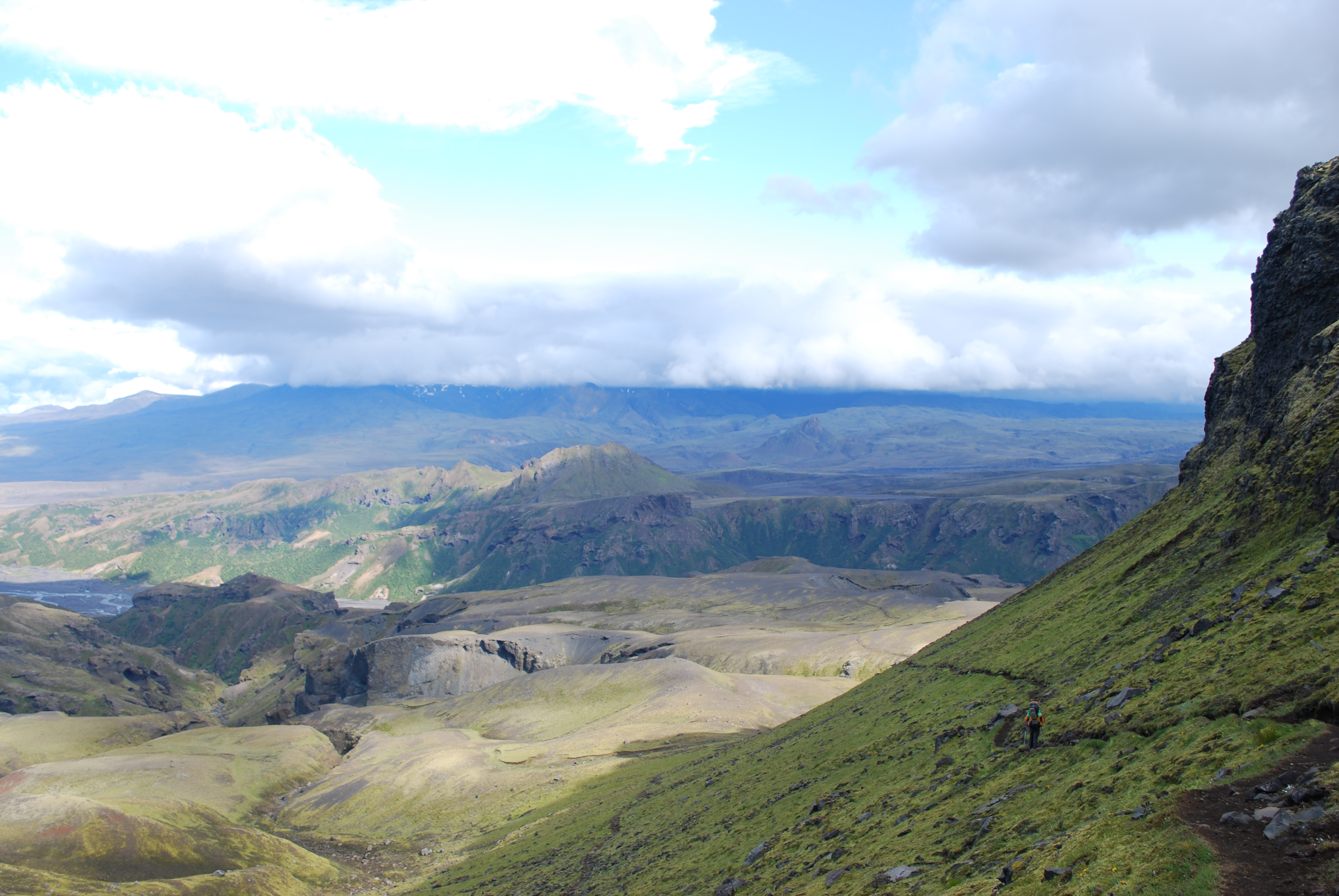
The hills where Thorolf was buried

Chapter 31 of Eyrbyggja Saga reveals the death of Thorolf Halt-Foot, who is also the father of Arnkel. Thorolf is reincarnated as a Draugr and a frightening marauder who leaves his tomb to cause devastation around Þórsnes. Thorolf's undead ventures also reveal specific overtones from the Wild Hunt legends. Thorolf's body is buried, reburied, burned, and is reincarnated as a bull, though he continued to cause relentless terror for nearly a year before he finally was permanently laid to rest by Arnkel, who buried his remains on a hillside. Arnkel constructed a high stone wall around Thorolf's grave so that Thorolf could not overcome it. However, Thorolf seemed to continually haunt the hillside where he was buried.

This event took place in the autumn at Hvammr, that [one day] neither the shepherd nor the sheep came home. In the morning a search was made, and the shepherd was found dead not far from Þórólfrs cairn; he was completely coalblack and every bone was broken. He was buried near Þórólfr. Of all the sheep in the valley, some were found dead, and the rest that had strayed into the mountains were never found. Whenever birds landed on Þórólfrs grave, they fell down dead.'

— Eyrbyggja Saga chapter 34<

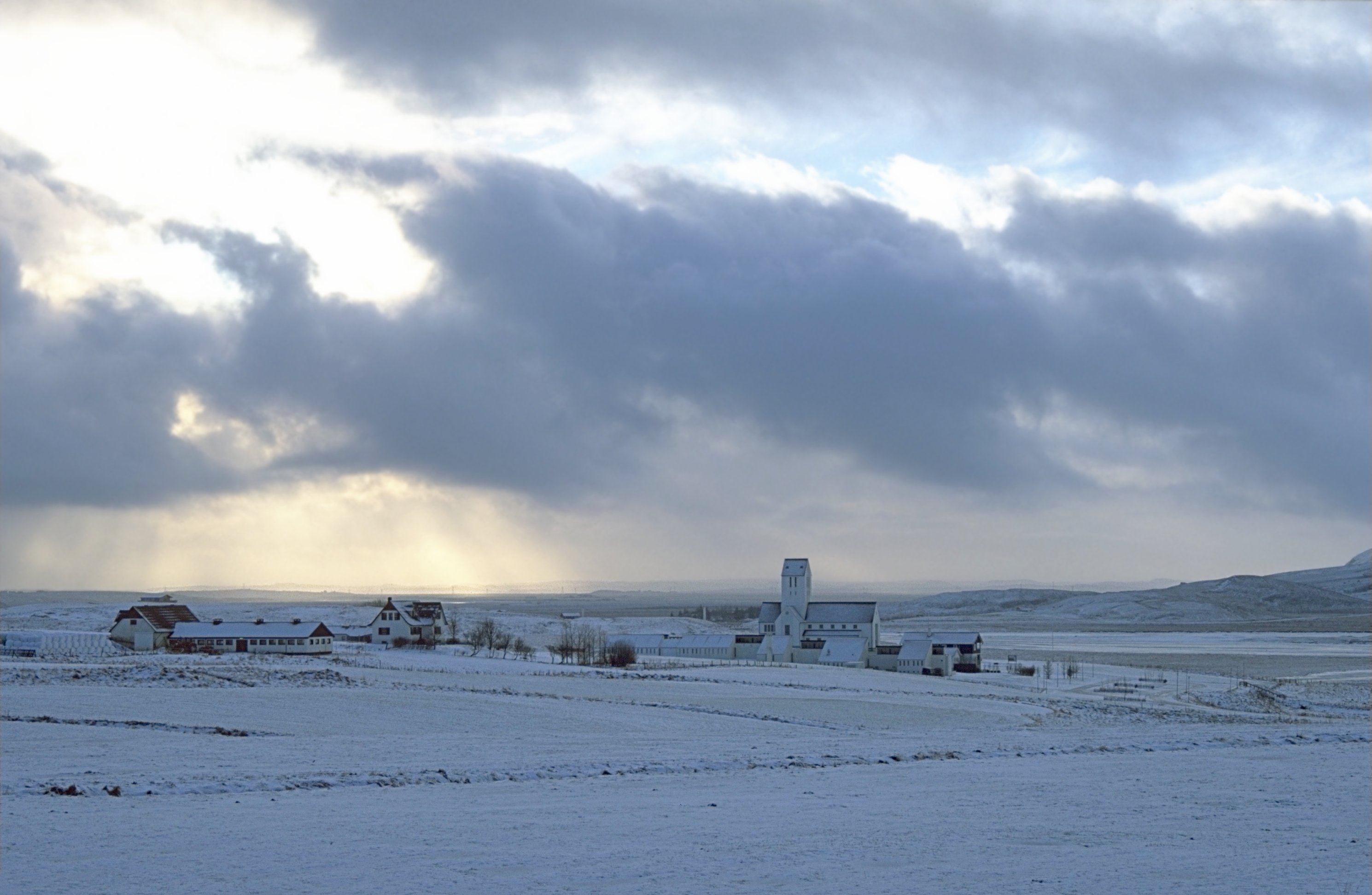
Skálaholt in the winter

=== Thorgunna ===
Chapters 50–51 of the Saga show a sickly, wealthy seafaring woman named Thorgunna from the south of Iceland who requested at her death bed to be buried in Skálaholt, her sheets and bedding to be burned, and her wealth to be donated to the Christian church. Upon Thorgunna's death, Thorodd, a friend, burns all her bedding except her bed sheets, which he gave to his wife as a gift. Thorodd donates her wealth to the church, and transports her body south to Skálaholt in a coffin. At nightfall, Thorodd decides to rest on a farmstead just outside Skálaholt. In the middle of the night, Thorodd and the farmstead owners awaken to find a dead, naked Thorgunna setting the dinner table and preparing a meal to eat. The farm owner tries to speak to Thorgunna and she disappears after having prepared a full meal. Thorodd along with the other members transporting the corpse and the homesteaders of the farm bless the meat by sprinkling holy water on it, eat the meat without harm, and then sleep peacefully through the night. The next day Thorgunna's corpse is transported to Skálaholt and laid to rest, never disturbing Thorodd or his kinsmen again.

=== Thorir Wooden-leg and his undead company ===
Following the death of Thorgunna, the author describes the death of a shepherd at Frodis-water where Thorgunna had once resided. The shepherd haunted the house at Frodis-water until Thorir Wooden-leg fell sick and died after encountering the shepherd's ghost. The shepherd and Thorir haunted Frodis-water, in which four more people fell sick and died one after the other. During the winter just before the Yule Feast, the constant sound of fisherman skinning fish could be heard outside the Frodis-water house. Additionally, a crew of six men were often seen manning a ten-oared boat not far from the shoreline. One night when the Frodis-water inhabitants were gathering for dinner, a seal's head began to emerge from the floor. The people of the house tried to smash the seal back down into the floor boards with sticks and clubs, but the seal kept steadily rising, further out of the floor after each blow. Kiartan, a young man at Frodis-water, ran into the house with a sledge hammer and struck the seal back down into the floorboards.

Following the incident with the seal at Frodis-water, Thurid and Kiartan invite their neighbors to Frodis-water for the Yule Feast. As Thurid, Kiartan and the guests are dining and sitting about the fire, Thorir and his followers entered the house and shake their dirty clothes all over the house, throwing mud on the guests. The next three nights, Kiartan moves the guests and the fire in to a different room, however Thorir and the other ghosts continue to enter the house, flinging mud and killing servants and farm-hands. Eventually, Snorri, who was also Kiartan's uncle, banishes Thorir and the ghosts from Snæfellsnes using an effective combination of Christian rituals and Icelandic common-laws.

== Popular culture ==
The saga has served as inspiration for a number of modern novels, including Robert Louis Stevenson's The Waif Woman: A Cue, from a Saga (1914), Jeff Janoda's Saga (2005), and Ármann Jakobsson's Glæsir (2011). Two plays, Jóhann Frimann's Fróðá (1938) and Robert Riemann's Björn der Wiking. Ein germanisches Kulturdrama in vier Akten (1901), also derive their plot's from the saga. It has also been adapted into a graphic novel, Eyrbyggja Saga (2022), by Andrew Pfrenger, Andrew Valkauskas, and Jonathan Burrello.

== Editions and translations ==
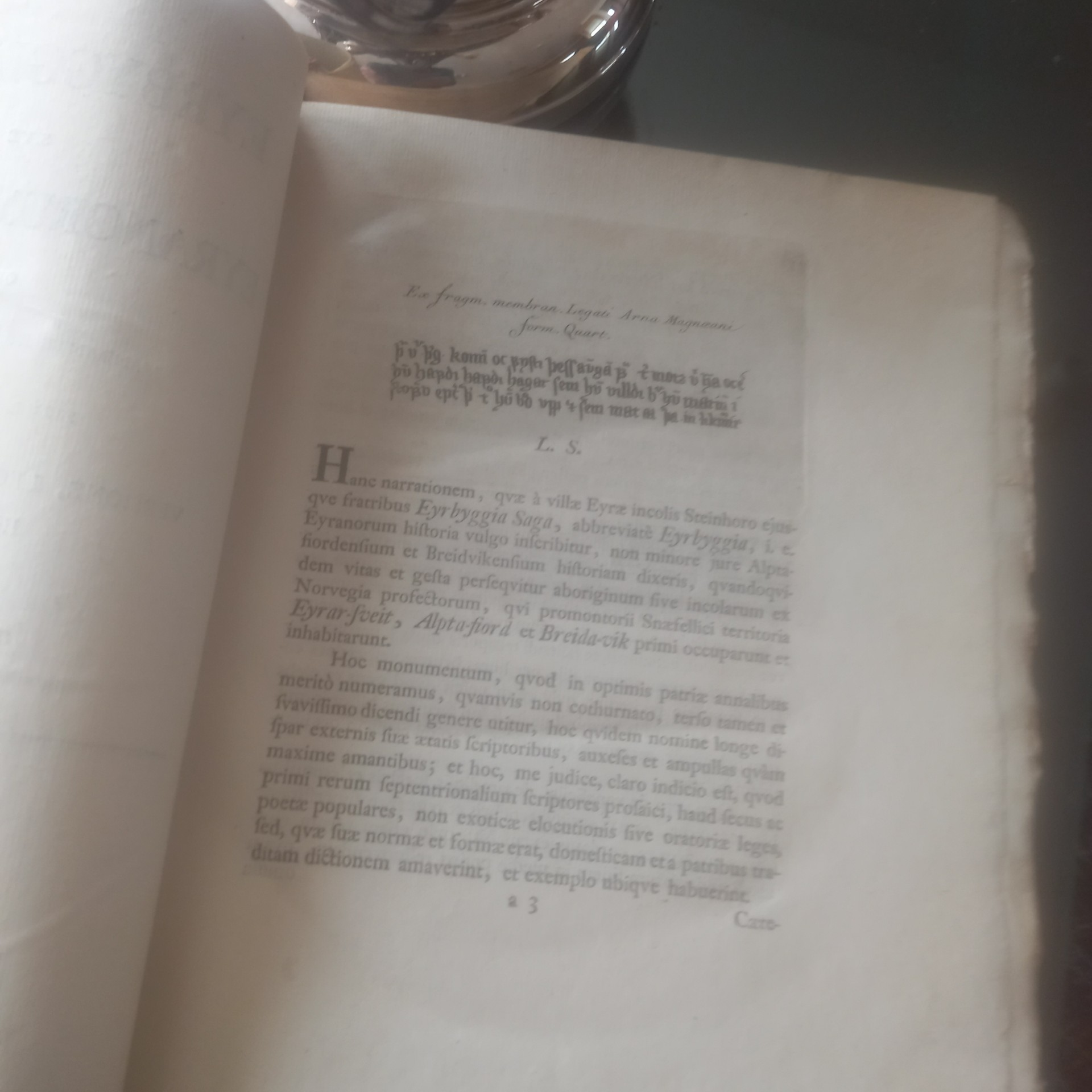
First page of the Latin preface

Editions

- Grímur Jónsson Thorkelín, ed. and translator into Latin (1787). Eyrbyggja-Saga sive Eyranorum Historia.Havniæ: P. F. Suhm.
- Guðbrandur Vigfússon, ed. (1864). Eyrbyggja saga. Leipzig: F. C. W. Vogel.
- Valdimar Ásmundarson, ed. (1895). Eyrbyggja saga. Reykjavík: Sigurður Kristjánsson.
- Gering, Hugo, ed. (1897). Eyrbyggja saga. Halle a. S.: M. Niemeyer. pdf
- Eyrbyggja saga. Brands þáttr ̨orva. Eiríks saga rauða. Grœnlendinga saga. Grœnlendinga þáttr, ed. by Einar Ól. Sveinsson and Matthías Þórðarson, Íslenzk fornrit, 4 (Reykjavík: Hið íslenzka fornritafélag, 1935)

Translations

- Morris, William; Magnússon, Eiríkr (1892). The Story of the Ere-dwellers (Eyrbyggja Saga): With The Story of the Heath Slayings (Heiðarvíga saga). London: Bernard Quaritch. Internet Archive
- Pálsson, Hermann; Edwards, Paul Geoffrey (1969). Eyrbyggja saga. London: Penguin. ISBN 0-14-044530-7.
- Eyrbyggja saga. Translated by Paul Schach; Lee M. Hollander. Lincoln, Nebraska: University of Nebraska Press. 1959.

== Studies ==
- Mallet, Paul Henri (1847). Northern antiquities. Translated by Percy, Thomas; Blackwell, I. A. London: H. G. Bohn. pp. 517–540., Scott's abstract of the saga (dated 1813).
- Ármann Jakobsson. 2007. Two wise women and their young apprentice. A miscarried magic class. ANF 122:43-57.
