= Circumambulation =

Ritual of moving around a sacred object

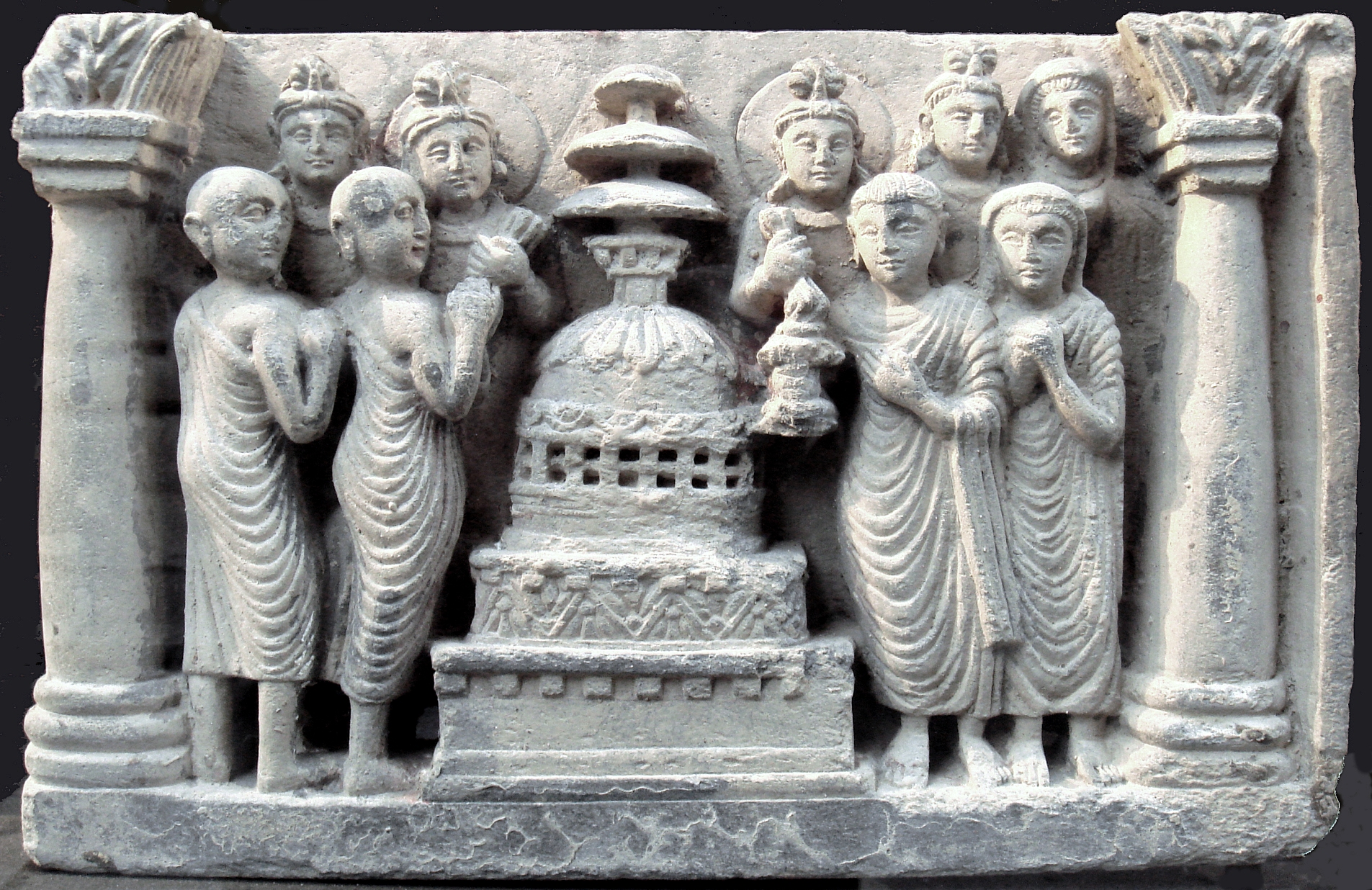
Relief of ancient Indian Buddhists (monks at left, a lay couple at right, statues behind) circumambulating a stupa in a chaitya temple

Circumambulation (from Latin circum around and ambulātus to walk) is the act of moving around a sacred object or idol.

Circumambulation of temples or deity images is an integral part of Hindu and Buddhist devotional practice (known in Sanskrit as pradakśiṇā). It is also present in other religions, including Christianity, Judaism, and Islam.

== Indian religions ==
In many Hindu temples, the temple structure reflects the symbolism of the Hindu association of the spiritual transition from daily life to spiritual perfection as a journey through stages. Passageways for circumambulation are present through which worshipers move in a clockwise direction, starting at the sanctuary doorway and moving inward toward the inner sanctum where the deity is enshrined. This is a translation of the spiritual concept of transition through levels in life into bodily movements by the worshipers as they move inwardly through ambulatory halls to the most sacred centre of spiritual energy of the deity. It is done in a clockwise direction and in an odd rather than even number of times. Circumambulatory walking around the shrine, by keeping time, is a common form of Hindu prayer. The ambulatory pathway made of stone around the shrine is called the Pradakshina path.

=== Buddhism ===
Ground plan of Borobudur showing the 9 platforms, each of which can be circumambulated, and the large central stupa

Circumambulation (pradakṣina or caṅkramaṇa in Sanskrit) is a ritual practice widely attested across Buddhist traditions, in which practitioners walk clockwise around a sacred object or space as an embodied form of reverence, recollection, and cultivation. In early Indian Buddhism, circumambulation was most commonly performed around stupas containing relics of the Buddha or eminent monks, with the clockwise direction symbolizing conformity to the cosmic and moral order. This practice spread throughout the Buddhist world and was adapted to local architectural and institutional contexts. In monastic settings, circumambulation came to be performed around temples, pagodas, or central sanctuaries, often as part of daily liturgy, pilgrimage, or merit-making activities. The physical act of walking while maintaining mindful attention and ritual orientation integrates bodily movement with devotional intention and doctrinal remembrance.

Within Pure Land Buddhism, circumambulation became closely associated with nenbutsu practice, especially in intensive retreat settings. Practitioners commonly circumambulate a statue or image of Amitābha Buddha while continuously reciting his name, thereby uniting physical movement, vocalization, and mental focus on rebirth in the Pure Land. This form of practice is systematized in the Tiantai tradition by Zhiyi (538–597) in his formulation of the constantly walking samādhi, one of the four samādhi types described in the Mohe zhiguan. In this samādhi, practitioners circumambulate an image of Amitābha for an extended period, traditionally ninety days, without sitting or lying down, while maintaining uninterrupted mindfulness of the Buddha. Through this disciplined and sustained circumambulation, the practitioner aims to stabilize concentration, purify karmic obscurations, and cultivate direct contemplative engagement with the Buddha as the object of practice.

=== Sikhism ===
In Lavan Pheras, which is performed during wedding ceremonies, the four rounds of pheras symbolize a sacrosanct bond in the form of circumambulation of a purifying object, in this case the holy book, Sri Guru Granth Sahib.

== Abrahamic religions ==
=== Christianity ===
In the Catholic Church, a priest sometimes circumambulates an altar while incensing it with a thurible. Also, at some Catholic shrines, it is a tradition to circle the cult object of the place, usually relics of a saint or an image of Jesus or the Virgin Mary. Often this is performed three times, as a reference to the Trinity. In the Tridentine Rite the elements of Bread and Wine are also incensed before the Consecration by encircling them, twice counterclockwise, once clockwise. This incensing was accompanied with Latin prayer. In some of the Eastern rites of the Catholic Church, the opening prayers at the beginning of Mass are chanted while the clergy circumambulate the altar. For example, the liturgy of the Syriac Catholic Church opens with the priest's and deacons' circumambulation and censing of the altar while holding the Holy Gospel high up for all to see and chanting the prayer ܐܺܝܪܰܡܪܡܳܟ݂ ܡܳܪܝ ܡܰܠܟܳܐ (I Exalt You my Lord, the King).

In Romania, there is an Easter custom to process around the church three times by singing priests leading the people, just before finishing Easter Liturgy. It symbolizes the funerary procession of the burial of Jesus Christ.

Circumambulation is common in many Eastern Orthodox and Oriental Orthodox services. In the Coptic tradition, during the liturgy, the priest circles the altar while an acolyte (altar boy) holds a cross high on the opposite side.

This is also a common practice in Lutheran, Roman Catholic, Anglican and Methodist churches during Lent when Stations of the Cross services are celebrated. The priest along with altar servers process around the interior of the church visiting each of the 14 stations.

On Palm Sunday in the churches of many Christian denominations, members of the congregation, oftentimes children, are given palms that they carry as they walk in a procession around the inside of the church. In the Church of Pakistan, a united Protestant Church, the faithful on Palm Sunday carry palm branches into the church as they sing Psalm 24.

=== Islam ===
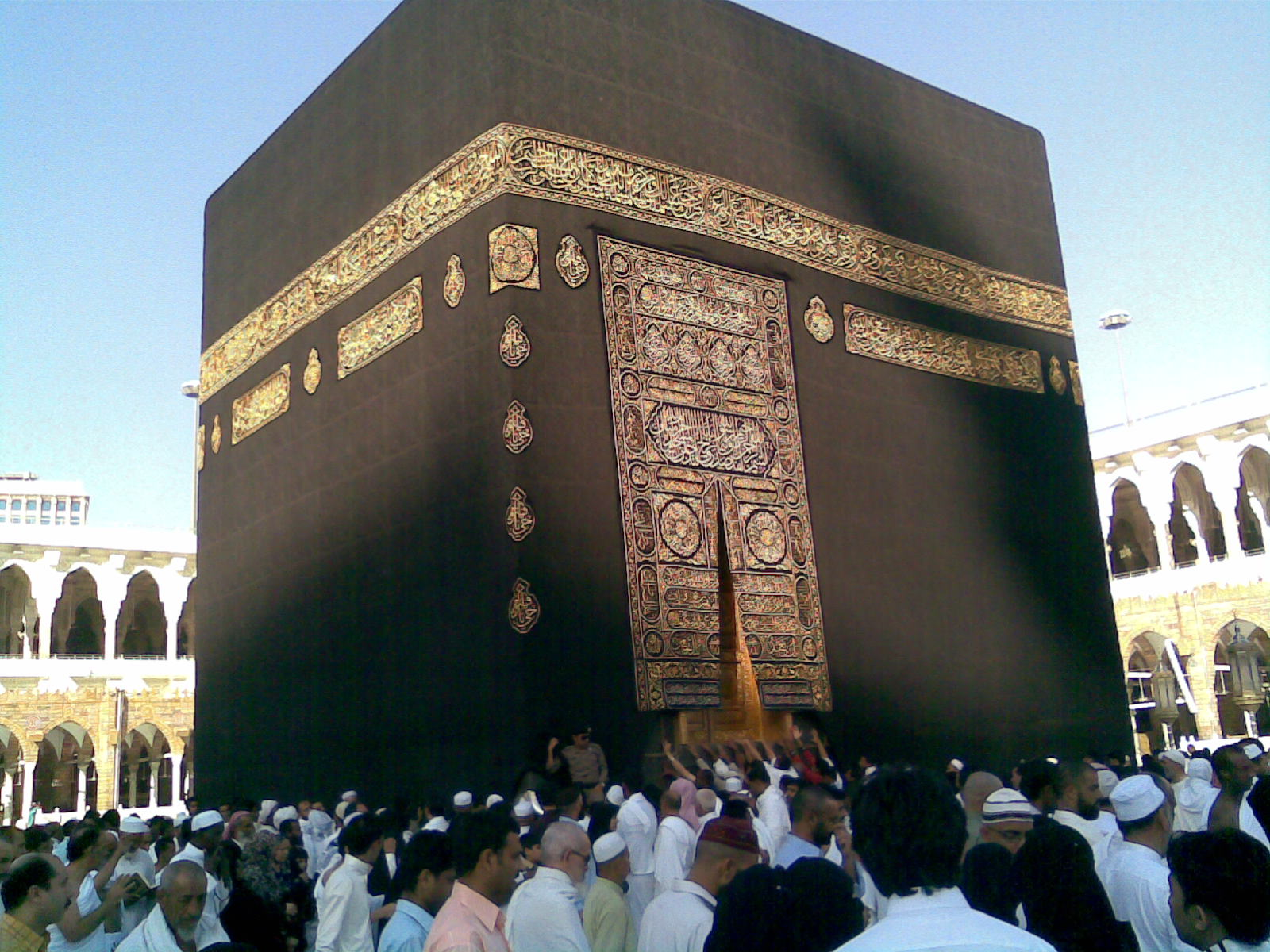
Muslims circumambulating the Kaaba.

Tawaf (طواف) is one of the Islamic rituals of pilgrimage. During the Hajj and Umrah, Muslims are to circumambulate the Kaaba (most sacred site in Islam) seven times, in a counter-clockwise direction. The circling is believed to demonstrate the unity of the believers in the worship of God, as they move in harmony together around the Kaaba, while supplicating to Allah.

=== Judaism ===
Judaism uses circumambulation in the Hakafot ritual during the Festival of Sukkot culminating in seven Hakafot on Hoshanah Rabbah, the end of the Festival. They are also performed during Hakafot on Simchat Torah, where Jews often dance circling the Torah Scrolls. Traditionally, Jewish brides circumambulate their grooms during the wedding ceremony under the chuppah and much Jewish dancing at weddings and Bar Mitzvahs is done by moving in a circle.

According to the Mishnah in Tractate Middot 2:2, when a person ascended to the Temple Mount in Jerusalem on the Three Pilgrimage Festivals in the time of the Temple's existence, they would circumambulate counter-clockwise. Someone who had something bad happen to them would circumambulate clockwise so that when someone saw them going in this unusual direction the person could tell them what was wrong (i.e., they were a mourner or were excommunicated) and the person encountering them would pray for them in the name of "the One who dwells in this House."

=== Baháʼí Faith ===
Followers of the Baháʼí Faith perform circumambulation of both the Shrines of the Báb and Bahá'u'lláh during their lesser pilgrimage to Haifa and Bahjí, in Israel. While circumambulating, observance of these Manifestations of God is done in complete silence and also performed on holy days such as the birth and ascension of Bahá'u'lláh as well as the birth and martyrdom of the Báb.

== Bön ==
The Bönpo in the Tibet traditionally circumambulate (generally) in a counter-clockwise direction, that is a direction that runs counter to the apparent movement of the Sun.

== Freemasonry ==
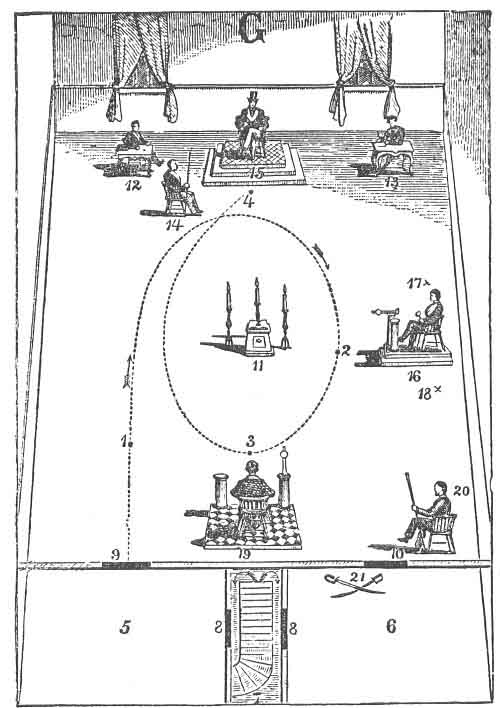
Engraving showing circumambulation in the Entered Apprentice degree of Freemasonry.

Candidates for the three principal degrees of Freemasonry circumambulate the altar in the lodge room. It is done in a clock-wise fashion. The number of times which candidates ambulate around the altar depends on which degree is being presented.

== See also ==
- Circle dance
- Kora (pilgrimage)
- Parikrama
- Sauvastika
- Stupa
- Sunwise (clockwise)
- Svastika
- Tawaf (Islamic ritual)
- Widdershins (counter-clockwise)
