= The Ghaist's Warning =

Scottish ballad

The Ghaist's Warning is a Scottish ballad based on Robert Jamieson's translation of the Danish ballad Svend Dyring (DgF 89; TSB A 68). It was published by Sir Walter Scott in the notes to The Lady of the Lake in 1810. Scott describes the ballad as being written not in the common language of the time, but in the "old Scottish idiom" such as to produce a more literal translation.

The ballad describes a group of children who are abused by their evil stepmother after the death of their biological mother; the dead mother then rises from the grave to warn against their mistreatment.

The Saturday Review praised Svend Dyring, arguing that the ballad, "with its combination of intense pathos and high imaginative power, stands alone, we are inclined to think, in the ballad-literature of Europe."

== In literature ==
In Emily Brontë's 1847 novel Wuthering Heights, Ellen (Nelly) Dean sings a portion of the ballad to Hareton Earnshaw, though the lyrics are somewhat different from those published by Scott. Henry Wadsworth Longfellow published a short story based on the ballad as The Spirit Mother. George MacDonald’s novel Sir Gibbie mentions Sir Walter Scott’s translation of the tale as read to the captivated title character multiple times by his friend Donal Grant.

== Recordings ==
A version of the ballad has been recorded by Danish harpist Niss Stricker.

== Lyrics ==
Lyrics
	Translation published by Sir Walter Scott	Danish (as sung by Niss Stricker)
Lyrics	Child Dyring has ridden him up under öe, (And O gin I were young!); There wedded he him sae fair a may. (I' the greenwood it lists me to ride.) Thegither they lived for seven lang year, (And O gin I were young!); And they seven bairns hae gotten in fere. (I' the greenwood it lists me to ride.) Sae Death's come there intill that stead, And that winsome lily flower is dead. That swain he has ridden him up under öe, And syne he has married anither may. He's married a may, and he's fessen her hame; But she was a grim and a laidly dame. When into the castell court drave she, The seven bairns stood wi' the tear in their ee. The bairns they stood wi' dule and doubt,— She up wi' her foot, and she kick'd them out. Nor ale nor mead to the bairnies she gave: "But hunger and hate frae me ye's have.' She took frae them the bowster blae, And said, "Ye sall ligg i' the bare strae!" She took frae them the groff wax-light: Says, "Now ye sall ligg i' the mirk a' night!" 'Twas lang i' the night, and the bairnies grat: Their mither she under the mools heard that; That heard the wife under the card that lay: "For sooth maun I to my bairnies gae!" That wife can stand up at our Lord's knee, And "May I gang and my bairnies see?" She prigged sae sair, and she prigged sea lang, That he at the last ga'e her leave to gang. "And though sall come back when the cock does craw; For though nae langer sall bide awa." Wi' her banes sae star a bowt she gae; She's riven baith wa' and marble gray. Whan near to the dwalling she can gang, The dogs they wow'd till the lift it rang. Whan she came till the castell yett, Her eldest dochter stood thereat. "Why stand ye here, dear dochter mine? How are sma brithers and sister thine?"— "For sooth ye're a woman baith fair and fine; But ye are nae dear mither of mine." "Och! how should I be fine or fair? My cheek it is pale, and the ground's my lair."— "My mither was white, wi' cheek sae red; But thou art wan, and liker ane dead."— "Och! how should I be white and red, Sae lang as I've been cauld and dead?" When she cam till the chalmer in, Down the bairns' cheeks the tears did rin. She buskit the tane, and she brush'd it there; She kem'd and plaited the tither's hair. The thirden she doodl'd upon her knee, And the fourthen she dichted sae cannilie. She's taken the fifthen upon her lap, And sweetly suckled it at her pap. Till her eldest dochter syne said she, "Ye bid Child Dyring come here to me." Whan he cam till the chalmer in, Wi' angry mood she said to him: "I left you routh o' ale and bread; My bairnies quail for hunger and need. "I left ahind me braw bowsters blae; My bairnies are liggin i' the bare strae. "I left ye sae mony a groff wax-light; My bairnies ligg i' the mirk a' night. "Gin aft I come back to visit thee, Wae, dowy, and weary thy luck shall be." Up spak little Kirstin in bed that lay: "To thy bairnies I'll do the best I may." Aye when they heard the dog nirr and bell, Sae ga'e they the bairnies bread and ale. Aye whan the dog did wow, in haste They cross'd and sain'd themsells frae the ghast. Aye whan the little dog yowl'd, with fear (And O gin I were young!); They shook at the thought that the dead was near (I' the greenwood it lists me to ride.) or, (Fair words sae mony a heart they cheer.)	Svend Dyring han red sig op under ø (Så fager da falder den rim); Der fæsted han sig så væn en mø (Fagre ord fryde så mangt et hjerte) I otte år de sammen var (Så fager da falder den rim); Og otte børn hun til verden bar (Fagre ord fryde så mangt et hjerte) Så kom der døden på det land (Så fager da falder den rim); Der døde den dejlige liljevånd (Fagre ord fryde så mangt et hjerte) Svend Dyring han red da op under ø (Så fager da falder den rim); Han fæsted sig atter en anden mø (Fagre ord fryde så mangt et hjerte) De små børn de stod så sorrigfuld mod (Så fager da falder den rim); Hun stødte dem bort alt for sin fod (Fagre ord fryde så mangt et hjerte) Om aftenen silde da børnene de græd (Så fager da falder den rim); Det hørte deres moder under mulden ned (Fagre ord fryde så mangt et hjerte) Og der hun kom i stuen ind (Så fager da falder den rim); De små børn de stå med tårer på kind (Fagre ord fryde så mangt et hjerte) I beder Svend Dyring gå til mig ind (Så fager da falder den rim); Hun talte til ham med vreden sind (Fagre ord fryde så mangt et hjerte) Skal tiere hjem til eder jeg gå (Så fager da falder den rim); Så krank en lykke skal I få (Fagre ord fryde så mangt et hjerte)
