= Illustrations of Northern Antiquities =

1814 non-fiction book by Henry Weber, Robert Jamieson and Walter Scott

Illustrations of Northern Antiquities (full title: Illustrations of Northern Antiquities, from the Earlier Teutonic and Scandinavian Romances; Being an Abstract of the Book of Heroes, and Nibelungen Lay; with Translations of Metrical Tales, from the Old German, Danish, Swedish, and Icelandic Languages; with Notes and Dissertations) is a pioneering work of comparative literature originally published in 1814. It provides translations and abstracts of medieval German and Scandinavian works, including the Nibelungenlied, Heldenbuch, and various metrical tales from Old German, Danish, Swedish, and Icelandic, accompanied by notes and dissertations. Its three authors were Henry Weber, who précised the Nibelungenlied and Heldenbuch; Robert Jamieson, who translated Danish and other ballads, stressing their close connection with Scottish ballads; and Walter Scott, who provided an abstract of Eyrbyggja saga. It significantly extended British readers' access to early Germanic literature.

== Composition and publication ==
The three authors of the Northern Antiquities were all well-known to each other. Henry Weber was a German refugee supported by Scott as a talented literary scholar; in the year the Northern Antiquities were published he had a mental health collapse and was hospitalized for the rest of his life at Scott's expense. The ballad-collector Robert Jamieson had helped Scott with his Minstrelsy of the Scottish Border in 1800, and Scott retained his admiration for Jamieson's work in this field.

Work on the Northern Antiquities began at least as early as 1810, when Scott approached the Rev. Richard Polwhele as a possible contributor. Scott may have been responsible for more than the "Abstract of the Eyrbiggia-Saga" that appeared over his name, or rather initials: his son-in-law and biographer J. G. Lockhart asserted that the verse translations scattered through Weber's abstract of the Nibelungenlied were actually Scott's work, though more recently it has been argued that he only revised Weber's verse. The opening Advertisement has also been tentatively attributed to him.

As an affluent patron of scholarship, Scott also advanced the publishing of the work despite skepticism from publishers about its commercial viability. Northern Antiquities; or Tracts, Designed to Illustrate the Early History, Poetry, and Romance of the Nations of the North of Europe was announced for publication as early as 1811, and originally included much material that did not appear in the published volume, such as an abstract of Hervarar saga (rather than Eyrbyggja saga). It was actually published under its final title only in June 1814 in Edinburgh and August 1814 in London, the two publishing houses involved being John Ballantyne and Co., and Longman, Hurst, Rees, Orme and Brown, and the printers being James Ballantyne and Co. The book appeared in royal quarto format at a price of three guineas, making it a rather expensive item, and it did not sell well. In consequence a planned second volume was never published, nor did Weber's hopes that the project might lead to "a periodical publication on the subject of ancient Romance and Antiquities in general, Foreign & British" come to fruition. One or the other of these might have included the "translations from some very old Swiss battlesongs" Scott mentioned having completed, or some of the projects mentioned in the Advertisement of the Northern Antiquities: "the Romances of Russia...the more rare and less-known Sagas of Scandinavia...the Original Songs of the Letts and Esthonians...the Poetry of the Celtic Dialects".

== Historical importance ==
Weber's contribution to the Northern Antiquities is notable for including the first account in English of the Nibelungenlied, as no complete English translation appeared until 1848.

Jamieson "was the first to highlight the strong similarities in phraseology and themes between Scottish and Danish/Swedish ballads. This he did originally in his Popular Ballads and Songs (1806), but more fully and accurately in the Northern Antiquities. In the notes to his translation of the Danish ballad Rosmer Hafmand, Jamieson gave a synopsis with quotations of a ballad, Child Rowland, which he claimed to have heard in his infancy recited by a Scottish tailor. It has been suggested that some form of this ballad was quoted by Shakespeare in King Lear and provided Milton with the plot of Comus, though the Shakespearean scholar George Lyman Kittredge commented that it was "manifestly of modern composition".

Scott's version of Eyrbyggja saga was the first English abstract or translation of any of the Sagas of the Icelanders, and the first work to show a clear recognition of their qualities. The first complete translation of Eyrbyggja saga was the work of William Morris and Eiríkr Magnússon; it did not appear until as late as 1892. The abstract may have exercised an influence on Scott's own creative writing. After having long abandoned the writing of his first novel, Waverley, he resumed it shortly after completing his Eyrbyggja abstract, and at least two critics, Edith Batho and John M. Simpson, have detected in it, and in his subsequent novels, the qualities of social realism, comedy, drama, graphic description, and the heroic spirit with which Eyrbyggja saga is imbued.

== Contemporary reception ==
Francis Palgrave, writing in the Edinburgh Review, welcomed the appearance of a work throwing so much new light on early Germanic literature. He described Scott's contribution as "interesting" and Weber's abstract of the Nibelungenlied as one of the most curious parts of the book, but reserved most of his praise for the poetical talent and industry of Robert Jamieson, a man who "well understands the art of combining the useful with the agreeable", and urged him to "gratify the curiosity which he has excited" by publishing something similar on Russian, Latvian or Estonian literature.

An anonymous critic in the Monthly Review wrote of the "rich mass of neglected materials" of which Weber and Jamieson had made "an extensive, elegant, and learned analysis", and saw in Weber's historical survey of early German literature "a precision of information, an erudition of detail, and a comprehensive completeness of circumspection, rarely displayed by the poetic antiquary". He deplored Jamieson's decision to translate the Danish ballads into Scots rather than English, finding the result largely incomprehensible, but he praised the Eyrbyggja abstract as "truly valuable".
