= Bjorn Asbrandsson =

Bjorn Asbrandsson (c. 960 - after 1030) was an Icelandic Viking. He appears in the Sagas of Icelanders, in particular the Eyrbyggja saga. According to Irish tradition, Asbrandsson was a farmer, warrior, exile Jomsviking and settler in North America.

== Sources ==
- Die Saga von den Leuten auf Eyr.(Eyrbyggja saga). Hrsg. und aus dem Altisländischen übersetzt von Klaus Böldl. München: Eugen Diederichs Verlag 1999. ISBN 3-424-01480-X
- Bernhard Gottschling: Die Vinland Sagas. Aus dem Altisländischen übersetzt. Altnordische Bibliothek, Bd. 2, Hattingen: Verlag Bernd Kretschmer 1982.
- Paul Herrmann: 7 vorbei und 8 verweht. Das Abenteuer der frühen Entdeckungen. Hamburg: Hoffmann und Campe 1978, Teil VI.: Amerika - Das Hvitramannaland - Das Land der Bleichgesichter, darin Näheres zu Björn Asbrandsson und Gudleif Gudlaugson, S. 195–254.
- Lutz Mohr: Ein isländischer Jomswikinger in Pommern, Schweden und der Neuen Welt. In: Autorenkollektiv, Maritimes von der Waterkant. Peenemünde: Axel Dietrich Verlag 1994, S. 5–12. ISBN 3-930066-21-1
- Lutz Mohr: Die Jomswikinger, Mythos oder Wahrheit. Nordische Sagas zusammengestellt, kommentiert u. hrsg. Elmenhorst: Edition Pommern 2009. ISBN 978-3-939680-03-1
- Lutz Mohr: Drachenschiffe in der Pommernbucht. Die Jomswikinger, ihrer Jomsburg und der Gau Jom. Hrsg. von Robert Rosentreter. (edition rostock maritim). Rostock: Ingo Koch Verlag 2013. ISBN 978-3-86436-069-5
- Felix Niedner: Die Geschichte vom Goden Snorri (Eyrbyggja saga). Thule. Erste Reihe, Bd. 7. Hrsg. und übertr. von Felix Niedner. Jena: Eugen Diederichs Verlag 1920.
- Grönländer und Färinger Geschichten. Thule. Band 13. Hrsg. und übertr. von Felix Niedner. Neuausg. mit Nachw. von Siegfried Beyschlag. Düsseldorf-Köln: Eugen Diederichs Verlag 1965.
