= Widdershins =

Term in English for counter-clockwise

The anticlockwise or counterclockwise direction

Widdershins (sometimes withershins, widershins or widderschynnes) is an adverb meaning counter-clockwise, anti-clockwise, or lefthandwise, or in a movement around an object by always keeping it on the left. Literally, it describes a course opposite the apparent motion of the sun viewed from the Northern Hemisphere (the face of this imaginary clock is the ground the viewer stands upon). The earliest recorded use of the word, as cited by the Oxford English Dictionary, is in a 1513 translation of the Aeneid, where it is found in the phrase "Abaisit I wolx, and widdersyns start my hair." In this sense, "widdershins start my hair" means "my hair stood on end".

The use of the word also means "in a direction opposite to the usual" and "in a direction contrary to the apparent course of the sun". It is cognate with the German language widersinnig, i.e., "against" + "sense". The term "widdershins" was especially common in Lowland Scots.

The opposite of widdershins is deosil, or sunwise, meaning "clockwise".

== Etymology ==
Widdershins comes from Middle Low German weddersinnes, literally "against the way" (i.e. "in the opposite direction"), from widersinnen "to go against", from Old High German elements widar "against" and sinnen "to travel, go", related to sind "journey".

== Superstition and religion ==
Because the sun played a highly important role in older religions, to go against it was considered bad luck for sun-worshipping traditions.

It was considered unlucky in Britain in the Dark Ages to travel in an anticlockwise (not sunwise) direction around a church, and a number of folk myths make reference to this superstition; for example, in the fairy tale Childe Rowland, the protagonist and his sister are transported to Elfland after the sister runs widdershins round a church. There is also a reference to this in Dorothy Sayers's novels The Nine Tailors (chapter entitled The Second Course; "He turned to his right, knowing that it is unlucky to walk about a church widdershins ...") and Clouds of Witness ("True, O King, and as this isn't a church, there's no harm in going round it widdershins"). In Robert Louis Stevenson's tale "The Song of the Morrow," an old crone on the beach dances "widdershins".

In the Eastern Orthodox Church and the Oriental Orthodox Churches it is normal for processions around a church to travel in an anticlockwise direction. This remains the case regardless of which hemisphere they are performed in.

In Judaism circles are also sometimes walked anticlockwise. For example, when a bride circles her groom seven times before marriage, when dancing around the bimah during Simchat Torah (or when dancing in a circle at any time), or when the Sefer Torah is brought out of the ark (ark is approached from the right, and departed from the left). This has its origins in the Temple in Jerusalem, where in order not to get in each other's way, the priests would walk around the altar anticlockwise while performing their duties. When entering the Beis Hamikdash the people would enter by one gate, and leave by another. The resulting direction of motion was anticlockwise. In Judaism, starting things from the right side is considered to be important, since the right side is the side of Chesed (kindness) while the left side is the side of Gevurah (judgment). For example, there is a Jewish custom recorded in the Shulchan Aruch to put on the right shoe first and take off the left shoe first, following the example of Mar son of Ravina whom the Talmud records as putting his shoes on in this way.

In Islam, circling the Kaaba seven times anticlockwise, known as Tawaf (Arabic: طواف, romanized: tawaaf), is a Fard rite for the completion of the Hajj and Umrah pilgrimages.

The Bönpo in the Northern Hemisphere traditionally circumambulate (generally) in a counter-clockwise and 'widdershins' direction, that is to say, a direction that runs counter to the apparent movement of the Sun within the sky from the vantage of the ground. This runs counter to the prevalent directionality of Buddhism (in general) and orthodox Hinduism. This is in keeping with the aspect and directionality of the 'Sauvastika' (Tibetan: yung-drung), sacred to the Bönpo. In the Southern Hemisphere, the Bönpo practitioner is required to elect whether the directionality of 'counter-clockwise' (deosil in the Southern Hemisphere) or running-counter to the direction of the Sun (widdershins in the Southern Hemisphere) is the key intention of the tradition. The resolution to this conundrum is left open to the practitioner, their 'intuitive insight' (Sanskrit: prajna) and their tradition.

== See also ==
- Circumambulation
- Sunwise (Deosil)
- Clockwise
