= Henry William Weber =

English editor of plays and romances (1783–1818)

Henry William Weber (1783–1818) was an English editor of plays and romances, and a literary assistant of Sir Walter Scott.

== Life ==
Weber was born in 1783, allegedly in St. Petersburg, and is said to have been the son of a Westphalian who married an Englishwoman. He was sent with his mother to Edinburgh "by some of the London booksellers in a half-starved state." Sir Walter Scott employed him from August 1804 as his amanuensis, and secured for him profitable work in literature. Scott described Weber as "affectionate, but imbued with Jacobin principles". After Christmas 1813, during a sudden outburst at the end of a working day, Weber produced a pair of pistols, and challenged Scott to mortal combat. After a parley, Weber dined with the Scotts, but the next day he was put under restraint, and placed by his friends, with assistance from Scott, into an asylum in York, where he died in June 1818.

== Works ==
Weber edited multiple works, most notably:

- The Battle of Flodden Field: a Poem of the Sixteenth Century, with various Readings, Notes, &c., 1808; Newcastle, 1819. Sixteen copies of the Notes and Illustrations were struck off separately. Scott advised him in the publication and supplied materials.
- Metrical Romances of the Thirteenth, Fourteenth, and Sixteenth Centuries, with Introduction, Notes, and Glossary, 1810, 3 vols. Described by Southey as 'admirably edited' (Letters, ed. Warter, ii. 308).
- Dramatic Works of John Ford, with Introduction and Explanatory Notes, 1811, 2 vols. Weber was not skilled in old English literature, and did not include the early editions of the plays, which met with anger from correspondents.
- Works of Beaumont and Fletcher, with Introduction and Explanatory Notes, 1812, 14 vols.; Scott's annotated edition supplied many of the notes.
- Tales of the East; comprising the most Popular Romances of Oriental Origin and the best Imitations by European Authors, 1812, 3 vols. The preface was borrowed from the Tartarian Tales of Thomas Flloyd of Dublin (Athenæum, 14 April 1894, p. 474).
- Popular Romances, consisting of Imaginary Voyages and Travels, 1812 (Lowndes, Bibl. Man. ed. Bohn, iv. 2862).
- Genealogical History of Earldom of Sutherland, by Sir Robert Gordon [edited by Weber], 1813.
- Illustrations of Northern Antiquities from the earlier Teutonic and Scandinavian Romances, 1814; in this Weber was assisted by Dr. Jamieson and Scott.
