= Dalabyggð =

- Municipality
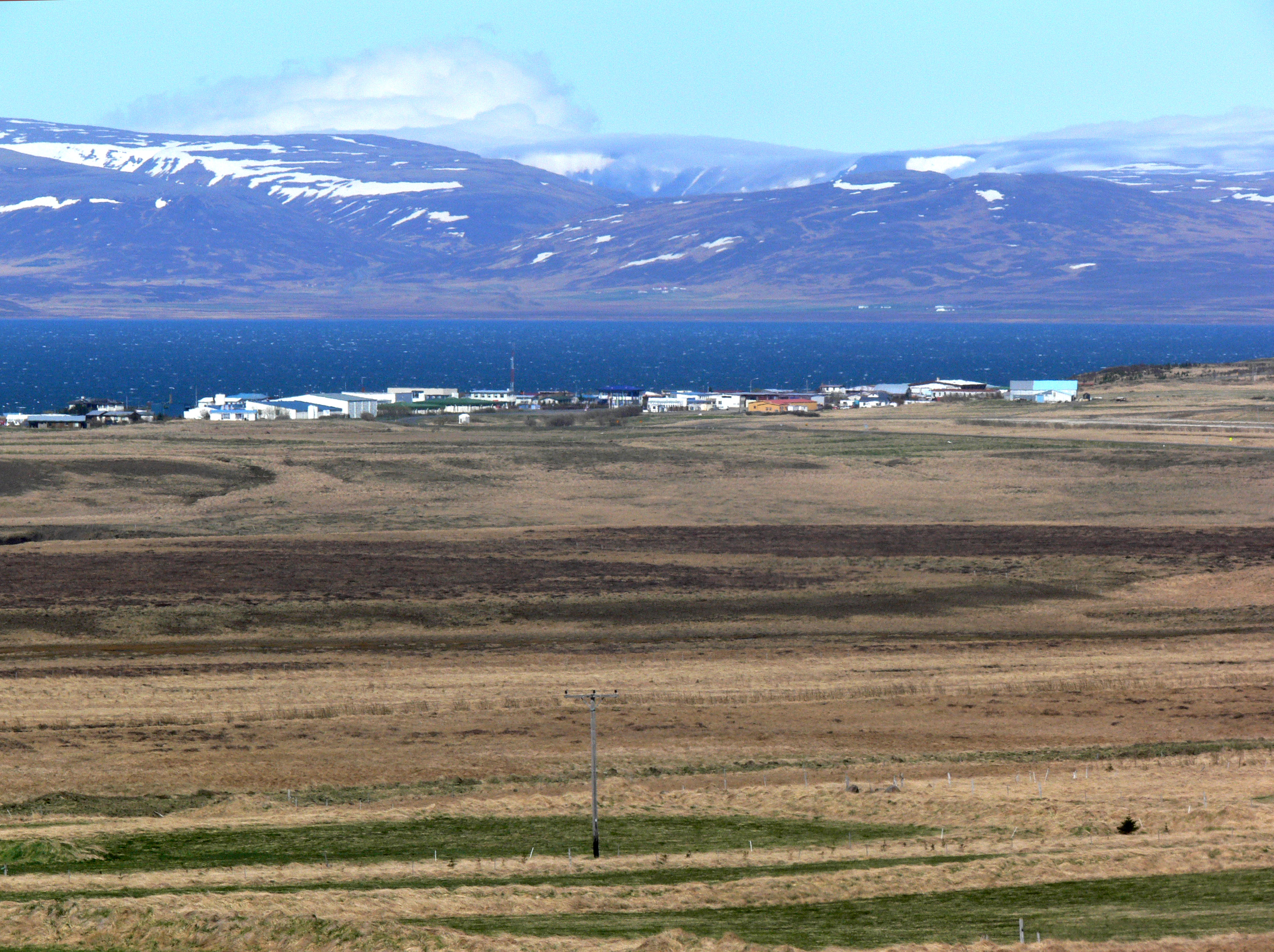
- Skyline of Dalabyggð

- Location of Dalabyggð

- Location within Iceland
- Coordinates: 65.110°N 21.767°W
- Country: Iceland
- Region: Western Region
- Constituency: Northwest Constituency

Government
  - Manager: Kristján Sturluson

Area
  - Total: 2,421 km^{2} (935 sq mi)

Population
  - Total: 673
  - Density: 0.28/km^{2} (0.73/sq mi)
- Postal code(s): 370, 371
- Municipal number: 3811
- Website: dalabyggd.is

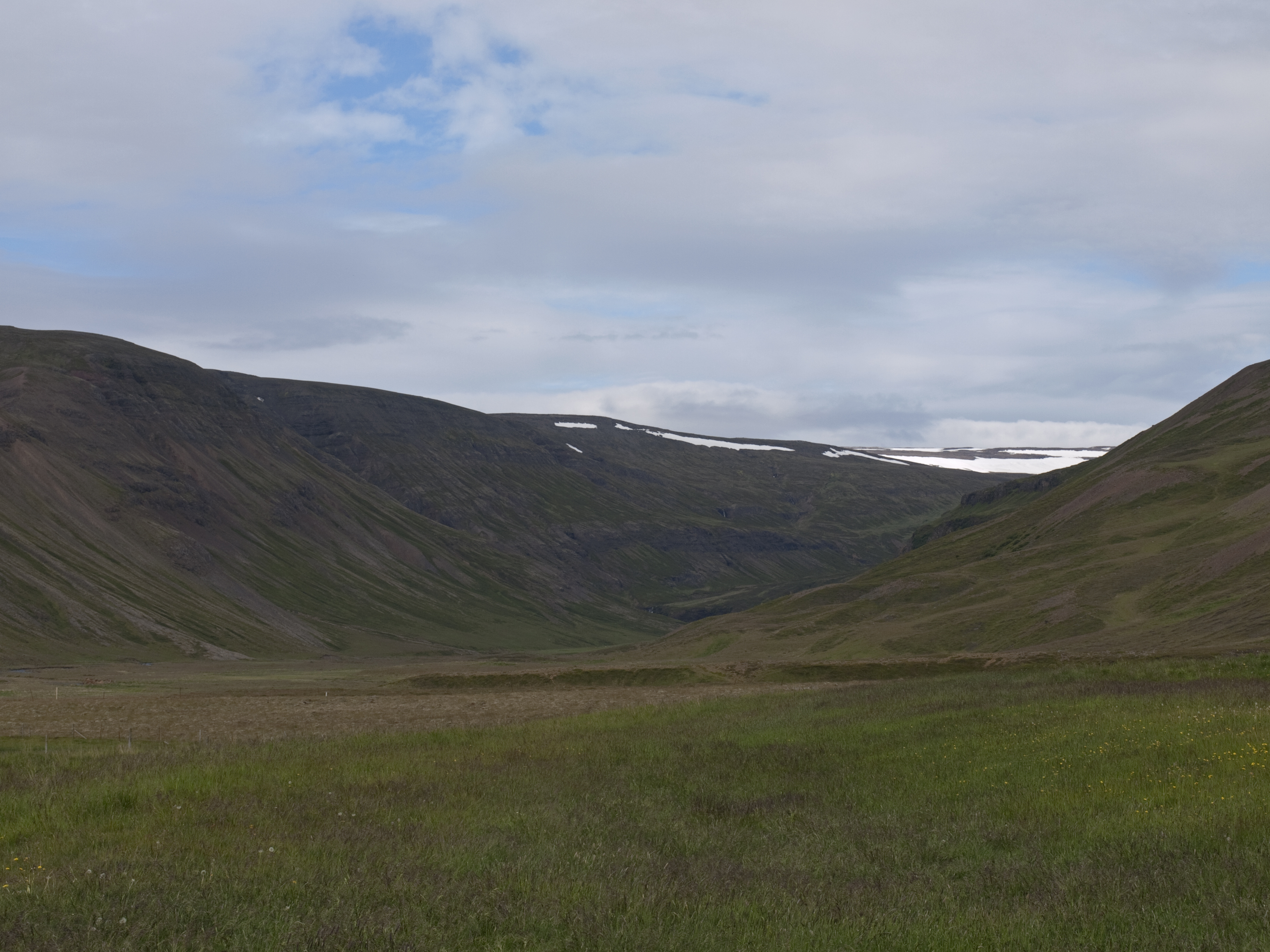
Skeggi Valley in Hvammur

Dalabyggð (Icelandic pronunciation: [ˈtaːlaˌpɪɣθ]) is a municipality located in Dalasýsla, western Iceland. Its main settlement is Búðardalur.

Dalabyggð is an agricultural area in the municipality which encompasses, the farm of Hvammur í Dölum where the poet, historian, and politician Snorri Sturluson was born. The main industry in the area is agriculture and sheep farming. There is also a thermal bath, Guðrúnarlaug, in the municipality named after Guðrún Ósvífrsdóttir from the Laxdæla saga.

The area is renowned for stories and people from Dalabyggð, such as: Auður djúpúðga, Leifur Eiríksson, Steinn Steinarr, Árni Magnússon, Eiríkur rauði, Sturla Þórðarson, and Ásmundur Sveinsson. There are many places in Dalabyggð with a great story, for example: Eiríksstaðir, Guðrúnarlaug, Haukadalur, and Ólafsdalur.
