= Haukadalur =

Haukadalur may refer to:

- Haukadalur, a valley in Bláskógabyggð municipality, Southern Region, Iceland
- Haukadalur, a valley in Dalabyggð municipality, Western Region, Iceland
- Haukadalur, a valley in Ísafjarðarbær municipality, Westfjords Region, Iceland
