= Helgi Fríðjónsson =

Icelandic artist (born 1953)

Helgi Þorgils Friðjónsson (born March 7, 1953, in Búðardalur, Iceland) is an Icelandic artist. He grew up in Búðardalur and moved at the age of 15 to Reykjavík. He studied Fine Arts and Crafts from 1971 to 1976, after which he went to The Hague and studied at De Vrije Academie (1976–77) and then at the Jan van Eyck Academie in Maastricht. He returned to Iceland when his studies were finished in 1979.

In a monograph by Elena Pontiggia, the artist's work was described as "northern, polar fairytales, full of fish and walrus, crossed by ice sheets and clouds, where unexpected water springs appear and there is an uninterrupted limbo of angels and birds chirping."

Helgi represented Iceland at the Venice Biennale in 1990.

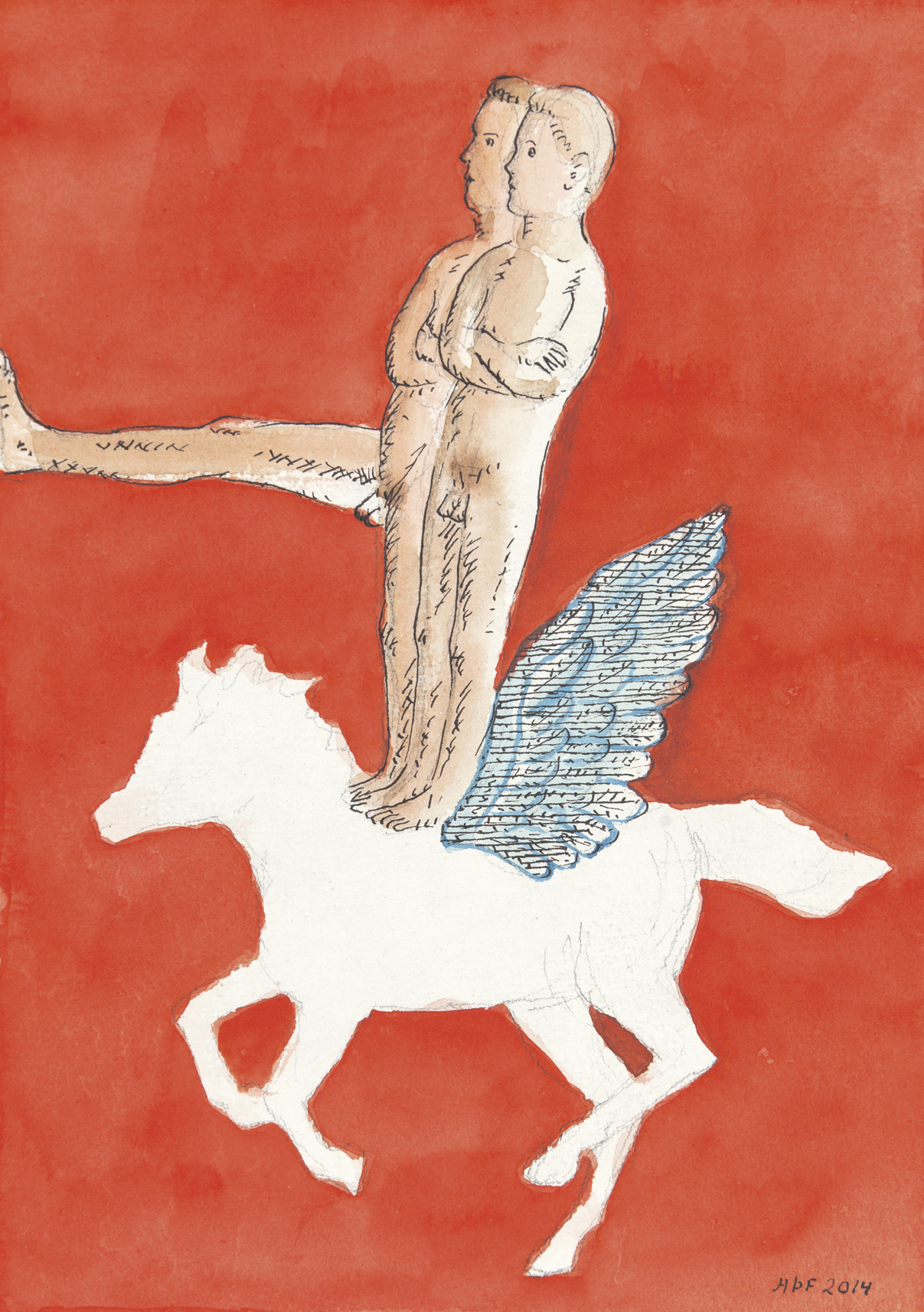
Untitled watercolour, 2014, by artist Helgi Friðjónsson

== Painting ==
Helgi has worked with drawings, graphics, sculpture and text. In his initial paintings, done while he was a student in the Netherlands, he complied with all the rules that were followed at the time. They struck him as overcomplicated and he elected to simplify things. He began to "transfer the sketch onto canvas, i.e. to think directly in the painting." He says he works images rapidly and that they are based on concepts connecting them to particular time periods.

Helgi was one of the painters involved at the beginning of the New Painting movement that was launched in Iceland in 1980. He first showed oil paintings in Gallery Leechers Street 7 in 1980, and then at the Nordic House in 1981. He also took part in large exhibitions like "New Painting" at The Living Art Museum and the "Gold Coast Spirit" exhibition held at the JL-House in 1983. The last two exhibitions garnered considerable publicity and shook up the Icelandic art community. It was at an exhibition at the Kjarvalsstaðir branch of the Reykjavík Art Museum in 1987 that Helgi first received widespread recognition for his work.

Helgi began to paint figurative characters, which have since characterized his painting, around 1987; this was seen in paintings in his Kjarvalsstaðir exhibition and others thereafter. The figures most characteristically depicted in his landscapes are centaurs and angels. Helgi extensively references legends and stories in ways that take on surreal undertones, but the work is never formally surrealistic. Gunnar B. Kvaran says in a book about Helgi published by the Reykjavík Art Museum in 1989 that the idea and the subject have always played an equally important role in the formal implementation of his inspirations.

Helgi says that he works with the solitary person in his paintings. This can, for example, be seen in the people and other figures who almost never touch, with eyes never meeting, so that the figures seem barely to know each other. He reinforces this theme by painting women as well as men naked and without appeal to sexuality. Solitude is absolute.

== Exhibitions ==
List of major exhibits:

- 1980 Biennale de Paris, France
- 1983 Thick Air, Fodor Museum, Amsterdam
- 1990 Venice Biennale, Venice, Italy
- 1993 Prospect ´93, Frankfurt, Germany
- 2002 Confronting Nature, the Corcoran Gallery of Art, Washington, D.C.

Solo exhibitions:

- 2005 Galerie der Stadt Salzburg im Mirabellgarten (with Eggert Petursson), Salzburg, Austria
- 2005 Tregablandin fegurd, Akureyri Art Museum, Akureyri, Iceland
- 2005 ASI Art Museum, Reykjavik
- 2005 Drawings, 101 Gallery, Reykjavik
- 2006 Galerie Leger, Malmö, Sweden
- 2006 Skard, Gallery Amina (with Einar Falur Ingolfsson), Reykjavik
- 2006 Viaggio in Islanda, Gallery Duet (with Salvo), Varese, Italy
- 2008 Gallery Turpentine, Reykjavik

== The Corridor gallery ==
Friðjónsson opened a small exhibition space in 1980 that has since exhibited works of Icelandic and international artists.

== Sources ==
- Gunnar B. Kvaran. (1989). Helgi Þorgils Friðjónsson. Reykjavík: Listasafn Reykjavíkur, Kjarvalsstaðir.
- Ólafur Kvaran. (1999). Helgi Þorgils Friðjónsson. Reykjavík: Listasafn Íslands.
- Ólafur Kvaran – fyrirlestur á http://www.ugla.hi.is í November 2008.
- Hannes Sigurðsson, Ólafur Gíslason, Þorri Hringsson. (1996). Helgi Þorgils Friðjónsson - Sjónþing VI. Reykjavík: Menningarmiðstöðin Gerðuberg. (Visual Congress 6, Gerðuberg Cultural Centre)
- Helgi Þorgils Friðjónsson. (2007). The corridor. Sótt 17. November 2008 at http://www.helgi-fridjonsson.com/
- Galerie Schulze (Author). (1991). Maximalists: Helgi Thorgils Fridjonsson, Marcello Jori, Milan Kunc, Daryush Shokof, Wainer Vaccari. Bess Cutler Gallery.
