= The Living Art Museum =

Artist-run contemporary art museum and exhibition space, Reykjavík, Iceland

- Nýló - Nýlistasafnið
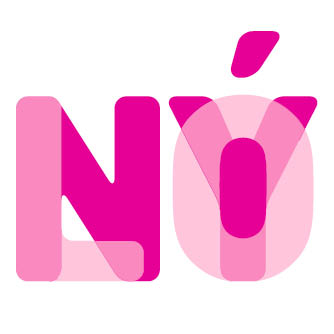

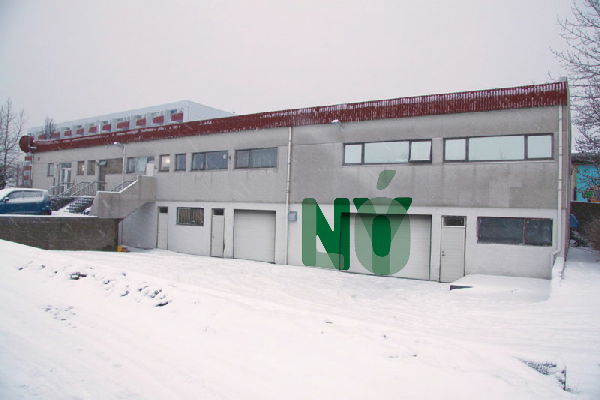
- Nylo entrance in 111 Breiðholt
- Established: 1978
- Location: Marshallhúsið, Grandagarður 20, 101 (Reykjavík), Iceland
- Coordinates: 64.1545615°N 22.0141313°W
- Type: Contemporary art museum
- Collection size: Approx. 2,300
- Director: Sunna Ástþórsdóttir
- Curator: The Board of The Living Art Museum
- Public transit access: Bus nr 14, Strætó bs
- Website: nylo.is

The Living Art Museum (Nýló) is a not-for-profit, artist-run museum and exhibition platform for innovative and experimental contemporary art in Reykjavík, Iceland. The Living Art Museum is committed to presenting, collecting, and preserving works by Icelandic and international artists, and engaging with the discourse on contemporary art practices.

== History ==
Nýló was founded by a group of twenty-six artists in 1978 as the first artist-run, non-profit organisation in Iceland. It began initially as a collection to preserve and archive artworks by a younger generation of artists that were otherwise ignored by the art public and authorities at the time; the founders were a diverse group of artists at various stages within their careers, and mainly associated with the fluxus movement and conceptual art. January 5, 1978 marks the inaugural meeting where the Living Art Museum Association was established and the initial foundations for its role were set in place. Since that founding year, Nýló has maintained the original goal to create a platform for progressive exhibitions and critical discussions on experimental art practices but has also remained inherently flexible as necessary within smaller, mainly volunteer-based organisations. Equal weight has been given to exhibiting and collecting works by both Icelandic and international artists.

On January 5, 2008 Nýló celebrated the 30th anniversary of its founding, marked by the publication of Nýlistasafnið / The Living Art Museum: 1978-2008.

In 1981, the Living Art Museum Gallery was founded and Nýló became a venue for exhibiting art along with collecting. This new role took some prominence over collecting and helped to make Nẏlȯ a foremost venue for performance during the 1980s. Originally the collection began in a 30 m2, rented space at Mjölnisholt 14, Reykjavík. Nýló then occupied a 200 m2 ground floor space in an alley at Vatnsstígur 3b, where another storey was added in October 1983. In 1989 Islandsbanki purchased the building and terminated the lease, forcing Nýló to move the museum's holdings into a rented storage space at Þingholtsstræti 6. A year later, Vatnsstígur 3b was purchased and Nýló occupied 560 m2 there until 2001. Between 2001 and 2004 the organisation had a brief stay at Vatnsstígur 3 and in 2006 moved to Laugavegur 26.

In early June 2014, the museum moved with its collection, archives and research facilities to Völvufell 13-21 in Breiðholt, a suburb of Reykjavík. For nearly three years Nýló had a temporary gallery space on the top floor of this location, in a former bakery.

In early 2017, the Living Art Museum moved to the second floor of The Marshallhouse, downtown Harbor area in Reykjavík. The house was a former herring factory and has been renovated by Architects Kurt og Pí. Nýló shares the building with Kling & Bang, artist-run gallery and Studio Ólafur Elíasson.

== Focus ==
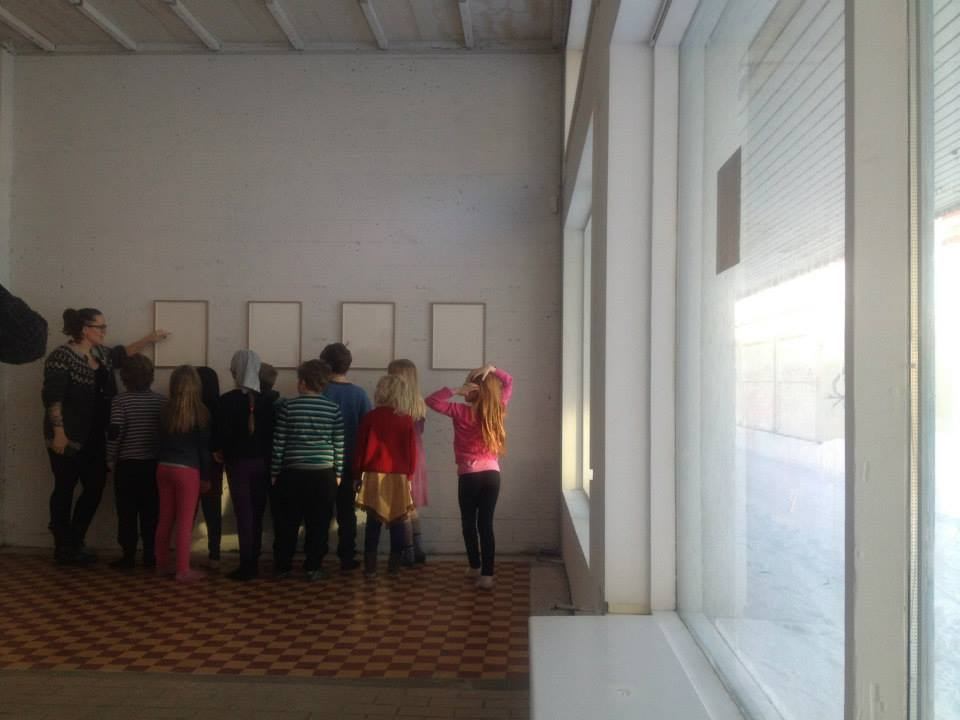
School visits to the Nýló gallery

Nýló focuses on contemporary art. Along with producing 6 to 8 exhibitions in the gallery space each year, Nýló also hosts performance, screenings, school visits and workshops. The museum promotes a critical approach to visual art while questioning and reflecting on its own direction and activities at all times. The Living Art Museum does not represent individual artists, but promotes artists within a nurturing, supportive and non-hierarchical relationship.

== The board ==
Nýló is managed by a board of five members and a secondary board of three members, who are voted in each year. Each member can serve for up to two years and with work done mainly voluntarily. Nýló evolves under the influence and characteristics of each successive board and therefore maintains a fluid relationship with developing concerns in the field of visual arts. The range in perspective on contemporary culture offered through the individuals serving on the board at any given time ensures Nýló maintains a role in these discourses, keeping the museum's engagements challenging and current.

The board members in 2023 were: Sunna Ástþórsdóttir (chairman), Auður Ómarsdóttir, Deepa Iyengar, Guðlaug Mía Eyþórsdóttir, Joe Keys, Lukas Bury, Thora Karlsdóttir, and Þórsteinn Eyfjörð.

== The collection ==
Nýló's collection consists of approximately 2,300 artworks from 1950 to the present. The collection has been acquired through donations by artists who have exhibited or members that have been included as part of the history of the museum. Originally artists and members were required to contribute two works upon becoming a member with an annual donation following that, which means that over the past 35 years, the museum has acquired a diverse collection of works by artists from abroad and within Iceland. This requirement ensured the growth of the collection but has also highlighted questions and/or issues related to the role of a collection, storage and space requirements, along with archival and preservation practices.

Nýló holds a significant collection of artist books and prints, as well as documents that speak to the context and history of the works in the collection. Icelandic artists such as Kristján Guðmundsson, Sigurður Guðmundsson, Hildur Hákonardóttir, Ásta Ólafsdóttir, Finnbogi Pétursson, Rúrí, Ragnar Kjartansson, Magnús Pálsson, Finnbogi Pétursson, and Helgi Fríðjónsson are included, along with works by international artists such as Dieter Roth, Carsten Höller, Dorothy Iannone, John Cage, John Armleder, Joseph Beuys, Matthew Barney, Meredith Monk, Richard Hamilton and Robert Filliou.

Nýló's collection can be accessed online at Sarpur, the collection database.

== Archives ==
The archive at Nýló is a diverse collection of papers and documents connected to the museum and exhibition history that was not a planned process but rather arose out of the necessity to do so. Consisting of catalogues, audio and video files, letters, photographs, films, and recorded meeting notes among other things, the archive is continuously growing and being filled in. With accessible information about the artists, exhibitions, and other events occurring in relation to the museum, it serves as a source for research and a timeline of the organisation's history.

As part of the 2008 anniversary program, Nýló began a set of parallel initiatives for the organization and archiving of documents from the history of artist-run spaces and artist performance in Iceland. This ongoing Performance Archive and Archive of Artist-run Initiatives project is in creative collaboration with the Reykjavik City Archive, the Icelandic Art Academy, the National Broadcasting Service of Iceland, and The Film Museum of Iceland, intending to make the history of local artist initiatives accessible for future research and preservation. This initiative is an important effort in connecting Nýló and the history of contemporary art in Iceland with alternative ideas, concepts, theories, and perspectives on cultural history.

== Archive of artist-run initiatives ==
A large part of the Nýló archive is built upon documentation of independent, artist-run spaces in Iceland. A variety of artist-run spaces have originated and been operated in Iceland over the last 35 years; all around the country, and in mobile and static forms. The common ground for these independent spaces has been in their role as a platform for progressive, experimental art, exhibitions of international artists and interactions between different groups in society and the art community. The abundance and productivity of artist-run spaces in Iceland have received international attention and these organisations have been considered very dynamic and influential.

The reasons why artists decide to create their own platforms for engagement may be rooted in a need for processes of creative collaboration; many see these initiatives as a part of their individual practice, along with an alternative outlet for expression. These types of organisations also arise out of a need for self-organisation where there may be a lack of infrastructure and specialization in specific fields of art, which provides the possibility of open space for new approaches. As an artist-run organisation, Nýló is not an exception in this case and is ambitious to embrace the history of local artist-run initiatives, while continuing to collect documentation on current and future spaces.

== Performance archive ==
The archiving of performance work documentation began at the beginning of 2008 and is currently still active. The results of this process were presented at Nýló as a contribution to the Reykjavik Art Festival. For this occasion, an informative booklet, with texts and images of the projects was printed. The Nýló performance archive initially included documentation of 20 performance works from the period 1978–1981.

Recently the documentation of 46 performances have been added to the collection. The process and collection have been made in close relation to the artists in question, and those who have used performance extensively in their art practice. Many local artists work with performance as a medium, but for only a few it is a center medium. This project aims to preserve performance documentation and performance-related works and to establish Nýló as a central museum for performance in Iceland.

== Publications ==
NÝLISTASAFNIÐ / The Living Art Museum: 1978–2008 – The museum has collaborated on and published numerous catalogues on artists and exhibitions, including an extensive retrospective publication on the history of Nýló in Icelandic and English titled, NÝLISTASAFNIÐ / The Living Art Museum: 1978–2008, edited by Tinna Guðmundsdóttir. The publication was produced on the occasion of the 30th anniversary of the museum, January 5, 2008, and celebrates Nýló's exhibitions, accomplishments and transformations over time. The purpose behind the publication was to create a holistic journal and source of historical information by way of making the archives and documents accessible to interested parties. This overview contains all basic information concerning the goings-on within the museum from the day of its foundation – as a political art venue, a venue for contemporary art and as a place where works are collected and preserved. The layout, designed by Ármann Agnarsson, aims to make this information interesting and accessible while providing a foundation of the history of the Living Art Museum.

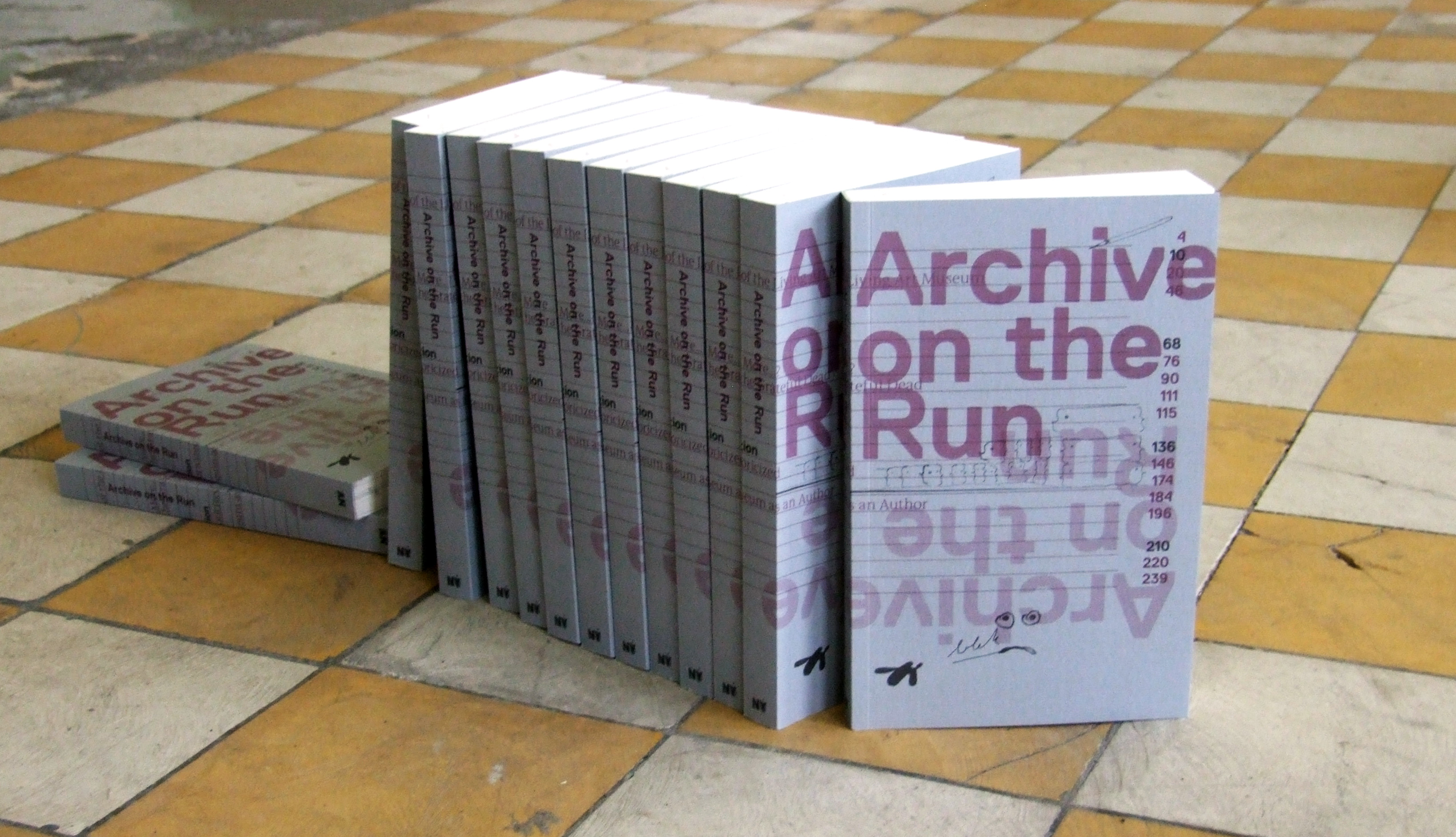
Archive on the Run

Archive on the Run – In 2009 Nýló initiated the Uppspretta project, which later produced the publication Archive on the Run. Uppspretta was intended to examine the museum’s operations, providing insight into shaping the future vision following the intense process of registering and evaluating the museum’s collection and possibilities, also centered on the 30th anniversary in 2008. The process included work meetings where artists, curators and individuals with ties to the museum, based locally and in the Nordic countries, discussed their thoughts and interpretations relating to Nýló. The result was a discussion in four parts hosted by the Iceland Academy of the Arts, which focused on the possibilities of museums and exhibition venues using Nýló as a focal point. "Archive on the Run" is intended to be a critical platform from which the future of Nýló is reconsidered, discussed and analyzed on different grounds, stemming from its context and history.

The publication contains various ideas based on the following discussion subjects: The Challenges of the Gift Based Collection, The Tension between the Collection and the Exhibition Venue, Cultural authority and alternatives to stagnation, and The Association and the community. Contributing writers include Amy Howden-Chapman, Bjarki Bragason, Bergsveinn Þórsson, Birta Guðjónsdóttir, Elena Tzotzi, Gunndís Ýr Finnbogadóttir, Maja Bekan, Gunnhildur Hauksdóttir, Huginn Þór Arason, Ingunn Fjóla Ingþórsdóttir, Katrín Inga Jónsdóttir Hjördísardóttir, Kristín Ómarsdóttir, Oddný Eir Ævarsdóttir, and Unnar Örn. The publication is edited by Ármann Agnarsson, Gunnhildur Hauksdóttir, Gunndís Ýr Finnbogadóttir and Unnar Örn Auðarsson.

S7 – Suðurgata >> Árbær (not in service) is a publication based on the cross-disciplinary artist initiative Gallery Suðurgata 7, which ran between 1977–1982. The gallery was organised by young artists who at the time hosted a variety of cultural events including exhibitions, film screenings, concerts and performances, as well as instigating a platform for critical dialogue with the publication and art magazine, Svart á hvítu or Black on White in English. The project brings together two different institutions, the artist-run Living Art Museum and Reykjavik City Museum. The Living Art Museum holds original documents about the gallery in its Archive of Artist-run Initiatives, while Reykjavík City Museum has preserved the building since 1983, when it was relocated after the gallery operation ended. The book was published in collaboration between the Living Art Museum and The Reykjavík City Museum on the occasion of the exhibition S7 – Suðurgata >> Árbær (not in service), which was part of the Reykjavik Arts Festival 2014, and edited by Bergsveinn Þórisson, Gunnhildur Hauksdóttir, Heiðar Kári Rannversson & Unnar Örn Auðarsson.

Án titils / Untitled follows the exhibition Rolling Line, the opening exhibition of the Living Art Museum in the Marshall House, 18 March – 11 June. The publication includes a large selection of archive material from Ólafur's studio, acquired by the museum last year as a gift on behalf of the artist by his family. The book also includes an introductory text by Halldór Björn Runólfsson, and interviews with Ólafur's friends and contemporaries, including Hreinn Friðfinnsson, Hildur Hákonardóttir, Kees Visser, Kristján Guðmundsson, Magnús Pálsson, Níels Hafstein, founder and director of The Icelandic Folk and Outsider Art Museum, Rúrí, Sigurður Guðmundsson and Þór Vigfússon. The artist's own voice also comes through in fragments of interviews taken with Ólafur and is closely connected to a chronology following the life of the artist. This is the first time that a book is published on Ólafur Lárusson's work.

== See also ==
- Franklin Furnace Archive
- Sequences Art Festival
- Storefront for Art and Architecture
