= Dorothy Iannone =

American artist (1933–2022)

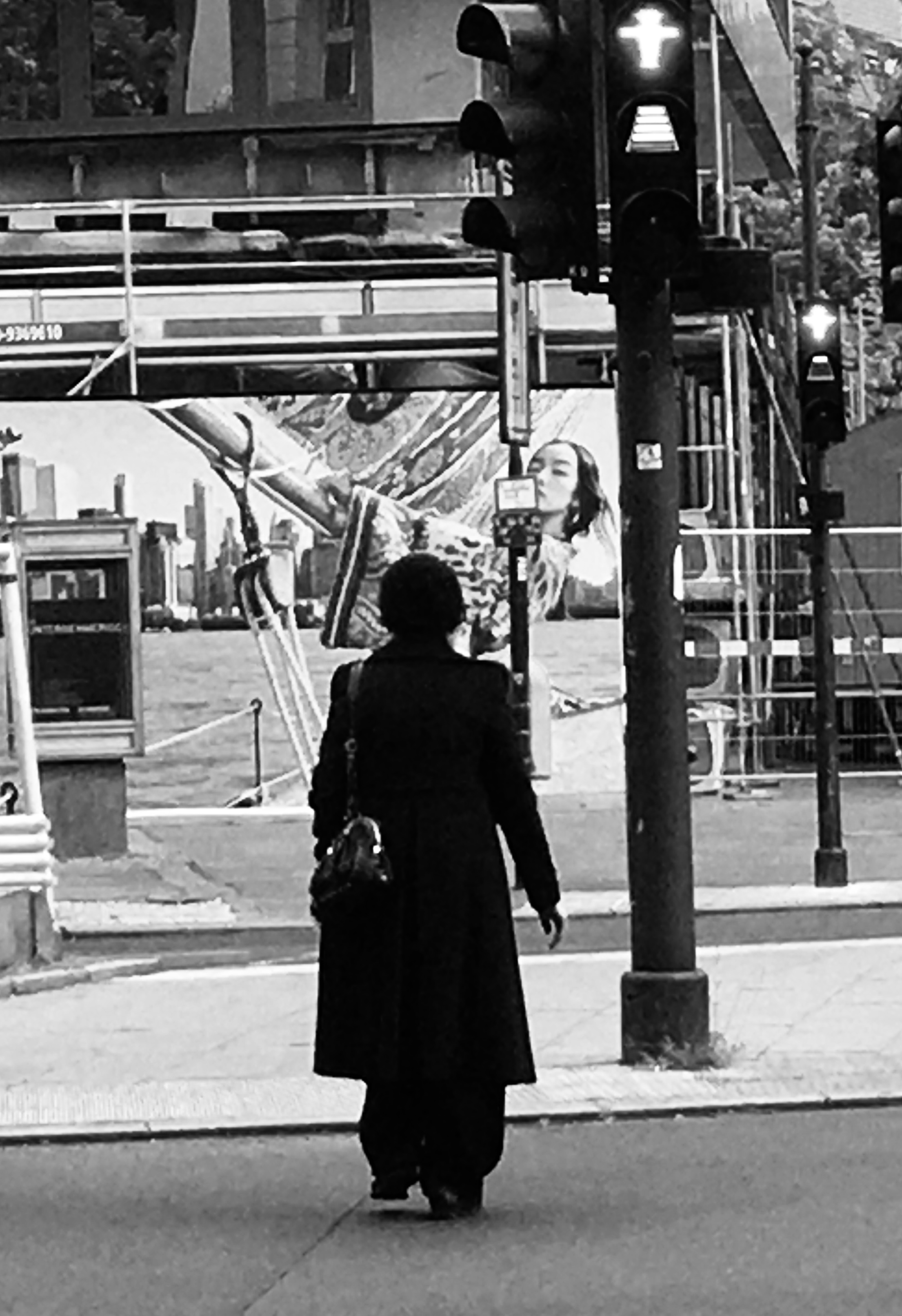
- Born: August 9, 1933; Boston, Massachusetts, U.S.
- Died: December 26, 2022 (aged 89)
- Known for: Painter

Dorothy Iannone (August 9, 1933 – December 26, 2022) was an American visual artist. Her autobiographical texts, films, and paintings explicitly depict female sexuality and "ecstatic unity." She lived and worked in Berlin, Germany.

== Early life ==
Iannone was born in Boston, Massachusetts, on August 9, 1933. Her father died when she was two years old and she was raised by her mother Sarah Nicoletti Iannone, later Sarah Pucci. She graduated from Boston University in 1957 with a B.A. in American Literature. She went on to study English literature at the graduate level at Brandeis University. In 1958, she married the painter James Upham and the couple moved to New York City. The following year, Iannone taught herself to paint alongside her husband. Between 1963 and 1967, she exhibited with her husband at the Stryke Gallery, an exhibition space she ran with her husband in New York and traveled frequently to Europe and Asia. In 1961, the U.S. Customs at the Idlewild Airport in Queens, New York seized the book she was traveling with, The Tropic of Cancer by Henry Miller, which was banned at the time. Iannone sued the U.S. Customs with assistance from the New York Civil Liberties Union which caused her book to be returned and the ban on Miller to be lifted.

== Career ==
The majority of Iannone's paintings, texts, and visual narratives depict themes of erotic love. Her explicit renderings of the human body draw heavily from the artist's travels and from Japanese woodcuts, Greek vases, and visual motifs from Eastern religions, including Tibetan Buddhism, Indian Tantrism, and Christian ecstatic traditions like those of the seventeenth-century Baroque. Her small wooden statues of celebrities with visible genitals, including Charlie Chaplin and Jacqueline Kennedy, especially display with the artist's interest in African tribal statues.

The explicit nature of Iannone's work frequently fell foul of censors in the 60s, 70s, and 80s. The artist said of the early censorship of her work: "When my work was not censored outright, it was either mildly ridiculed or described as folkloric, or just ignored." In 1969, the Kunsthalle Bern tried to censor Iannone's work in the group exhibition Ausstellung der Freunde by requesting that she cover up the genitals of her figures. In protest, Dieter Roth dropped out of the exhibition, and the curator of the Kunsthalle Bern, Harald Szeeman, resigned. Iannone recalled the experience in the Fluxus publication The Story of Bern or Showing Colors (1970).

Iannone's first solo exhibition in the United States, Lioness, was held at the New Museum in 2009. Her work was featured in numerous group and solo exhibitions across Europe throughout her career, and recently a substantial number of her works were collected in Dorothy Iannone: You Who Read Me With Passion Now Must Forever Be My Friends.

== Partnership with Dieter Roth ==
On a trip to Reykjavík, Iceland, in 1967, Iannone met the Swiss artist Dieter Roth. Iannone separated from her husband one week later. Iannone lived with Roth in Düsseldorf, Reykjavík, Basel, and London until 1974. Roth became Iannone's muse and features in much of her artwork. His nickname for her was "lioness." One of her most noted works involving Roth is her book An Icelandic Saga (1978–1986), which vividly illustrates the artist's first encounter with Roth and her subsequent breakup with her husband in the vein of a Norse myth. She also created paintings of her and Roth in sexual union as historical couples. For instance, I Am Whoever You Want Me To Be (1970) and I Begin To Feel Free (1970) reference both Antony and Cleopatra as well as brightly colored African tribal imagery. Iannone and Roth remained friends until his death in 1998.

== Death ==
Iannone died on December 26, 2022, at the age of 89.

== Exhibitions ==
- Day for Night: Whitney Biennial (2005), Whitney Museum of American Art, New York
- Dieter Roth & Dorothy Iannone (2005), Sprengel Museum, Hanover, Germany
- Seek the Extremes: Dorothy Iannone and Lee Lozano (2006), Kunsthalle, Vienna, Austria
- Rebelle. Art and Feminism 1969-2009 (2009), Museum voor Moderne Kunst, Arnhem, The Netherlands
- Dorothy Iannone: Lioness (2009), New Museum of Contemporary Art, New York NY
- Dorothy Iannone: The Next Great Moment In History Is Ours (2012), MOCA Tucson, Tucson, AZ
- Dorothy Iannone, Innocent and Aware (2013), Camden Arts Centre, London, UK
- Artists' Books of Dorothy Iannone (2014), New York Art Book Fair at MoMA PS1, Long Island City, NY

== Public collections ==
- Musée d'Art Moderne de la Ville de Paris, France
- Museum Ludwig, Cologne, Germany
- Museum Moderner Kunst Stiftung Ludwig Wien (mumok), Vienna, Austria
- The Living Art Museum (NYLO) Reykjavik, Iceland
- Musée d'art moderne de Saint Etienne métropole
