= Búðardalur =

- Village
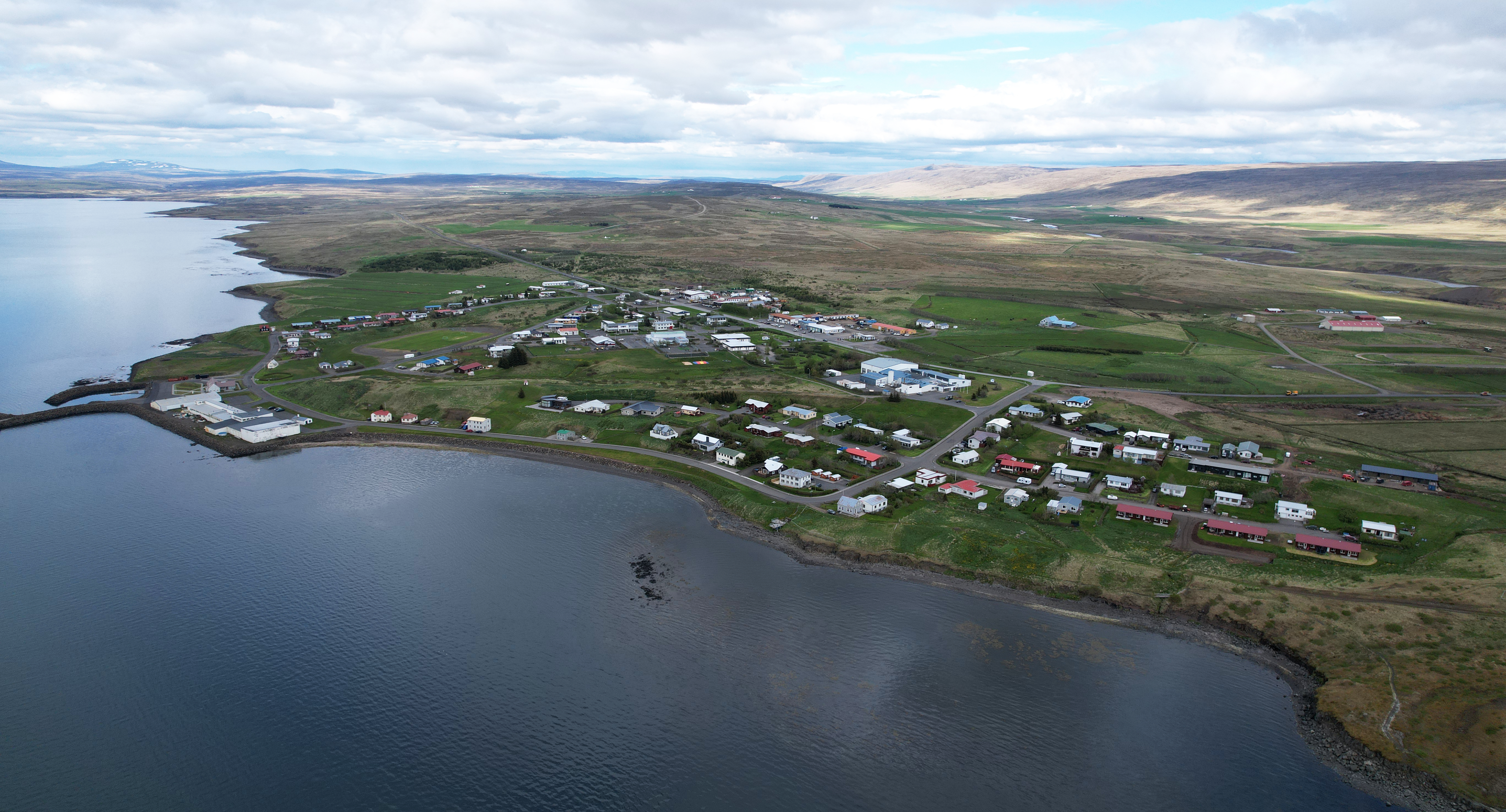
- Búðardalur

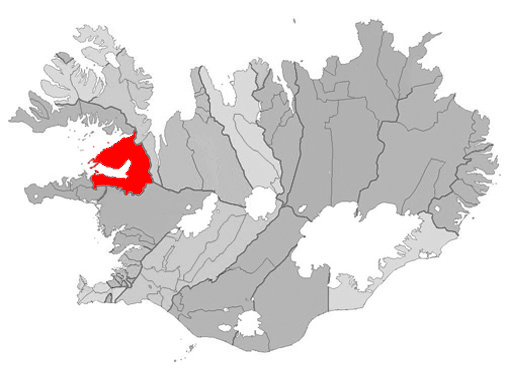
- Location of the Municipality of Dalabyggð

- Location in Iceland
- Coordinates: 65°07′N 21°46′W
- Country: Iceland
- Constituency: Northwest Constituency
- Region: Western Region
- Municipality: Dalabyggð

Population (2025)
  - Total: 245
- Time zone: UTC+0 (GMT)
- Post Code: 371

Búðardalur (Icelandic pronunciation: [ˈpuːðarˌtaːlʏr̥]) is a village situated on the Hvammsfjörður in the north-west of Iceland.

The village also lies at the north-eastern end of the Snæfellsnes peninsula and is part of the municipality of Dalabyggð. Búðardalur had about 270 inhabitants in 2014 and is a service center for the area, including the regional tourist information centre. In the traditional system of counties of Iceland that existed until the late 1980s, it was part of Dalasýsla, a name that is still used for the region.

== Overview ==
Búðardalur contains a swimming pool and a supermarket, petrol stations, hair salons, a pub/restaurant, a coffee shop, a health-care centre, an off-licence, a garage and a craft shop; the information centre is in the same building as a cafe and a museum on the Vínland expeditions. In addition to small craft enterprises, a dairy plant is a major employer in the area. More recently, tourism has gained importance in Búðardalur, including new construction projects such as a public swimming pool and the private expansion of short-term accommodation in the area.

The village has a long history, dating from the time of the first settlements in Iceland. The settlement is mentioned in the medieval Laxdæla saga, which is largely set in the surrounding Laxárdalur region. Historically, the area also developed as a local centre for the exchange of goods, a meaning reflected in the interpretation of the name as “Shop Valley”, derived from búðir (booths). In 1899, Búðardalur was officially granted the right of commerce. An old house from this time still exists.

At a short distance from the village is Eiríksstaðir, the homestead of Erik the Red, who was the first European to discover Greenland and whose son Leif Erikson, born at Eiríksstaðir, was the first European to discover America ahead of Columbus.

== Population ==
The area has been affected by rural flight, though population levels have stabilised in recent years.

- 2025: 245 inhabitants
- 2011: 245 inhabitants
- 1998: 256 inhabitants
- 1978: 304 inhabitants

== Climate ==
Depending on the isotherm used (−3 °C (27 °F) or 0 °C (32 °F)), Búðardalur has either the rare dry-summer subarctic climate (Köppen: Dsc) or the extremely rare cold-summer mediterranean climate (Köppen: Csc) with cold but not severe winters and cool summers.

Climate data for Hamraendar, 11 km (6.8 mi) from Búðardalur (1961-1990)
Month	Jan	Feb	Mar	Apr	May	Jun	Jul	Aug	Sep	Oct	Nov	Dec	Year
Record high °C (°F)	10.0 (50.0)	10.1 (50.2)	14.1 (57.4)	15.1 (59.2)	22.0 (71.6)	21.5 (70.7)	23.5 (74.3)	20.0 (68.0)	18.0 (64.4)	15.0 (59.0)	12.0 (53.6)	11.0 (51.8)	23.5 (74.3)
Mean daily maximum °C (°F)	0.8 (33.4)	1.3 (34.3)	1.4 (34.5)	4.3 (39.7)	8.2 (46.8)	11.4 (52.5)	12.9 (55.2)	12.4 (54.3)	8.9 (48.0)	5.5 (41.9)	2.3 (36.1)	1.1 (34.0)	5.9 (42.6)
Daily mean °C (°F)	−1.9 (28.6)	−1.1 (30.0)	−0.9 (30.4)	1.8 (35.2)	5.1 (41.2)	8.3 (46.9)	10.0 (50.0)	9.5 (49.1)	6.3 (43.3)	3.2 (37.8)	−0.1 (31.8)	−1.6 (29.1)	3.2 (37.8)
Mean daily minimum °C (°F)	−4.7 (23.5)	−4.0 (24.8)	−4.0 (24.8)	−1.4 (29.5)	1.9 (35.4)	5.2 (41.4)	7.0 (44.6)	6.6 (43.9)	3.5 (38.3)	0.6 (33.1)	−2.8 (27.0)	−4.5 (23.9)	0.3 (32.5)
Record low °C (°F)	−20.4 (−4.7)	−20.5 (−4.9)	−19.9 (−3.8)	−19.9 (−3.8)	−11.4 (11.5)	−2.9 (26.8)	0.0 (32.0)	−2.0 (28.4)	−5.9 (21.4)	−12.0 (10.4)	−15.9 (3.4)	−20.0 (−4.0)	−20.5 (−4.9)
Average precipitation mm (inches)	63.3 (2.49)	57.5 (2.26)	60.8 (2.39)	44.7 (1.76)	23.3 (0.92)	37.6 (1.48)	43.9 (1.73)	47.8 (1.88)	55.0 (2.17)	79.4 (3.13)	63.6 (2.50)	65.8 (2.59)	643.1 (25.32)
Average precipitation days (≥ 0.1 mm)	16.4	15.1	17.3	15.3	11.8	13.9	14.6	15.3	15.8	17.7	16.2	17.3	187.0
Source: Icelandic Meteorological Office
