= Dalasýsla =

- County
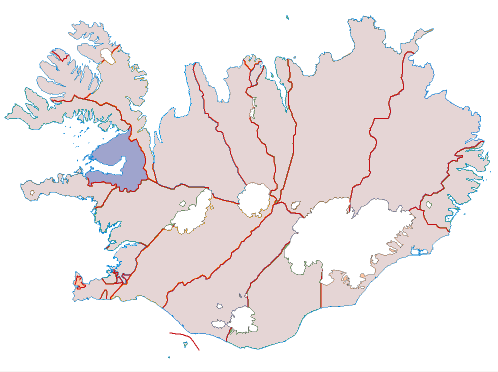
- County Dalasysla, Iceland
- Coordinates: 65°06′0″N 21°36′0″W
- Country: Iceland
- Region: Western Region
- Time zone: UTC+0 (GMT)

Dalasýsla (Icelandic pronunciation: [ˈtaːlaˌsistla], lit. 'Valley County') was one of the pre-1988 traditional counties of Iceland, located in the Western Region of the country. Its only town is Búðardalur.

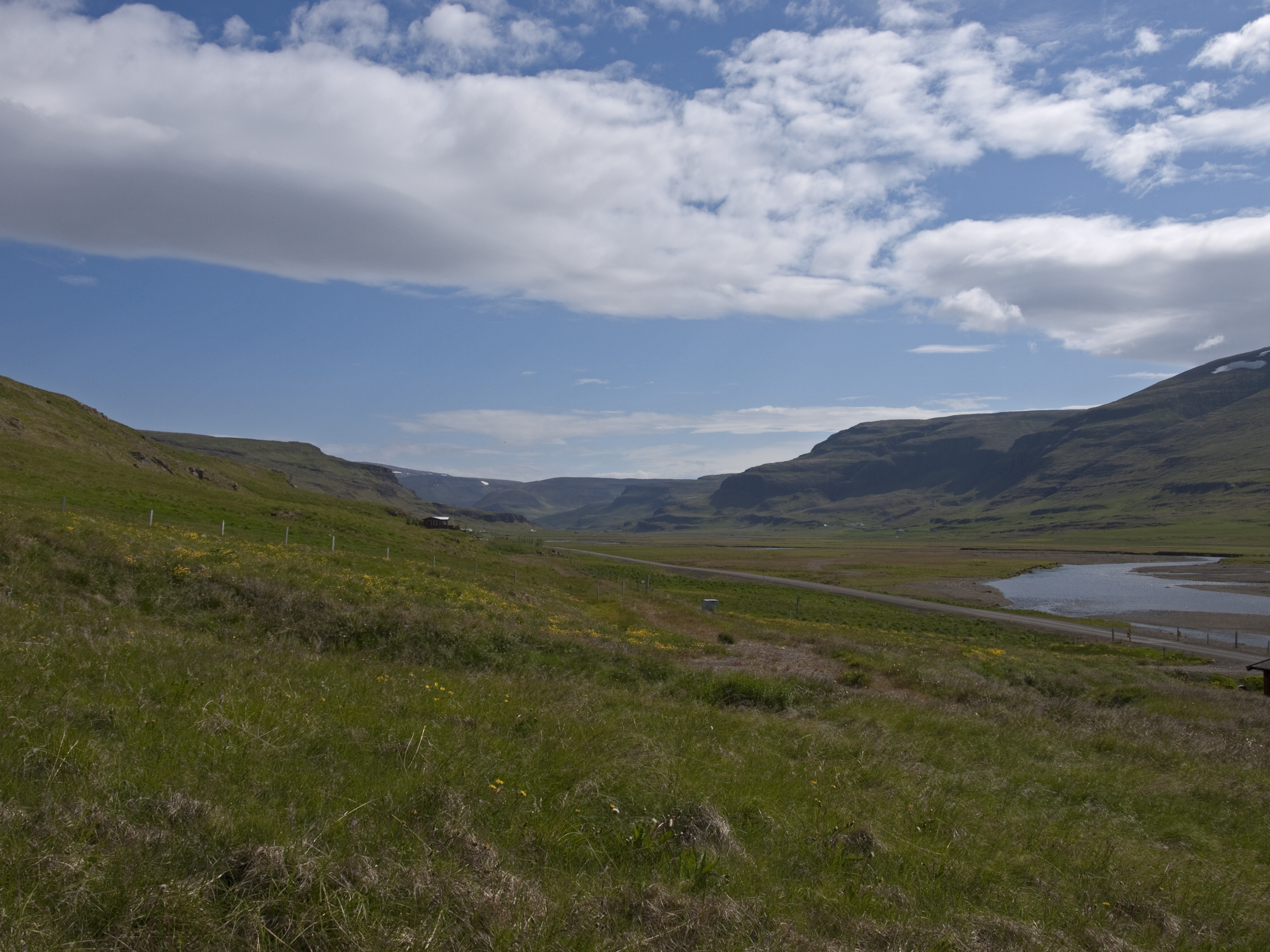
Haukadalur Valley in Dalasýsla

The county had a rich history dating back to the first settlers of Iceland. Leif Erikson grew up in Dalasýsla, at Eiríksstaðir, in the 10th century, and Árni Magnússon, scholar and collector of manuscripts, was born at Kvennabrekka in Dalasýsla in 1663.

The poet, historian, and politician Snorri Sturluson was born at the farm of Hvammur í Dölum. Painter Helgi Fríðjónsson was born in Búðardalur in 1953, as was artist Hreinn Friðfinnsson (1943–2024).
