= Amy Howden-Chapman =

New Zealand artist and writer

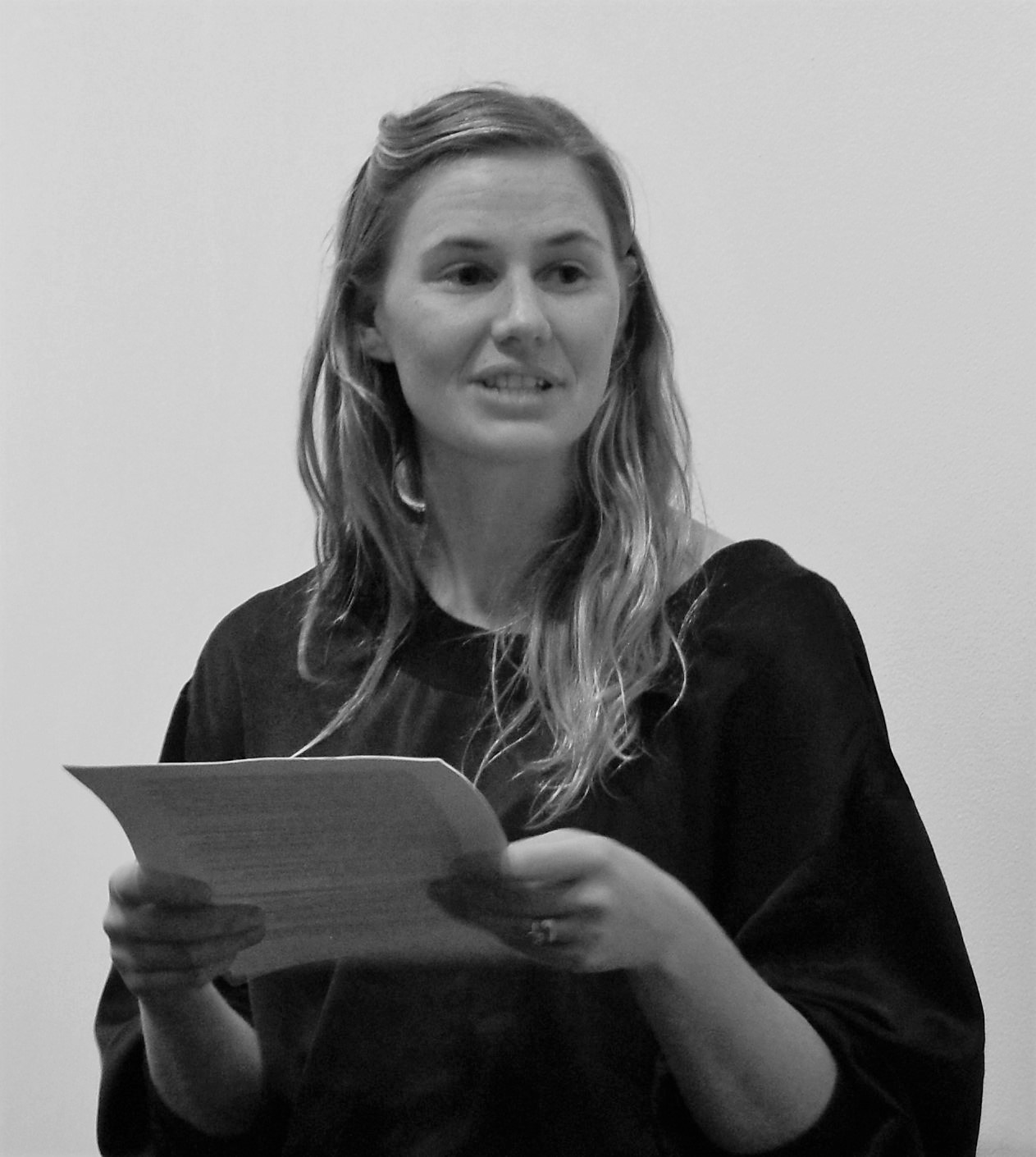
Amy Howden-Chapman portrait

Amy Howden-Chapman (born 1984) is a New Zealand artist and writer based in the United States. Her works are held in the collection of the Auckland Art Gallery Toi o Tāmaki. Many of Howden-Chapman's work focus on climate change and environmental protection. Howden-Chapman co-founded an organisation to promote climate change discussion within the arts. She has held residencies at McCahon House in New Zealand, the HOLA Public Art Residency in Los Angeles and was the 2016 DAAD Fellow at Potsdam Institute for Climate Impact Research, Germany.

== Early life ==
Amy Howden-Chapman was born in 1984 in the Wellington region of New Zealand.

== Education ==
Howden-Chapman studied at Victoria University of Wellington and graduated with a master's degree in creative writing and an Honours degree in Art History. She later studied at the California Institute of the Arts, and graduated with a master's degree in Fine Arts.

== Career ==
Howden-Chapman has exhibited extensively in New Zealand, the United States and Europe. Using performance, photography, video and print, Howden-Chapman's work investigates moments of cultural, environmental and political change. Many of her works focus on climate change and environmental protection.

Howden-Chapman is co-founder (with Abby Cunnane) of TheDistancePlan.org, an organisation that seeks to promote climate change discussion within the arts. She is a Visiting Associate Professor at the Pratt Institute, has taught in the sustainable systems course at The New School’s Parsons School of Design, and lectures at SUNY.

Major commissions:

- The Apologies, an installation developed with writer Andrew Gorin for the 2022 show Better than This at East Quay gallery in Watchet, UK.
- The Flood, My Chanting, a work commissioned as part of One Day Sculpture 2008, a series of temporary public artworks around New Zealand.
- Meanwhile, a film work for Hue & Cry (2012).

Notable exhibitions:

- Since the Great Depression, as part of performance art duo Raised By Wolves (with Biddy Livesey), at the New Zealand Film Archive Theatre, Wellington, New Zealand (2009).
- They Say Ten Thousand Years at Te Uru Waitakere Contemporary Gallery, Auckland, New Zealand (2014).
- Advice for our Aerial Ocean at Artspace Mezzanine, Auckland, New Zealand (2014).
- Sad Problems at The Living Art Museum, Reykjavík, Iceland (2015).
- Brick Fall, Glass Wall, a moving image and sound installation at The Physics Room, Christchurch, New Zealand (2016).

== Fellowships and awards ==
- Residency in McCahon House in 2014, and presented an exhibition of works produced during that time titled They Say Ten Thousand Years, held at Te Uru Waitakere Contemporary Gallery. This exhibition was accompanied by an interpretive essay by Victoria Wynne-Jones titled Rainbow Warriors of Light.
- Recipient of the 2015 HOLA Public Art Residency, Los Angeles.
- 2016 DAAD fellow at the Potsdam Institute for Climate Impact Research, Germany.
