= Eiríksstaðir =

Icelandic homestead

Coordinates: 65°03′33.0″N 21°32′20.2″W

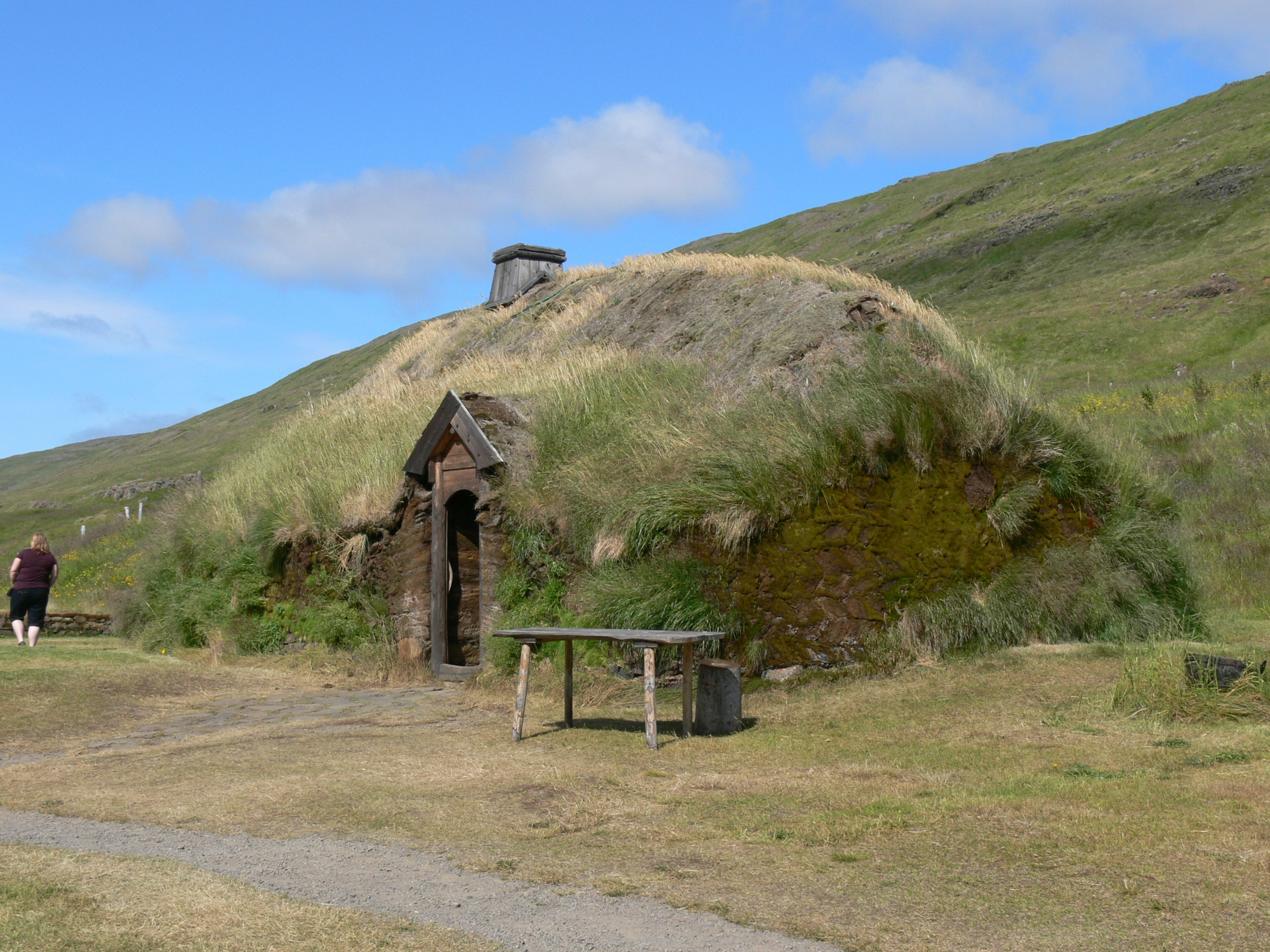
Reconstructed longhouse at Eiríksstaðir

Eiríksstaðir (Icelandic pronunciation: [ˈeiːriksˌstaːðɪr̥]) is the former homestead of Eiríkr Þorvaldsson, known as Erik the Red, at Haukadalur Valley in the Dalasýsla region of Iceland. It was likely the birthplace of his son Leif Eiríksson, the first known European discoverer of the Americas. A site thought to be that of the original farm has been investigated by archaeologists and remains of two buildings dating to the 9th–10th centuries have been identified. An open-air museum has been established nearby.

== Historical record ==
According to Landnámabók and the Saga of Erik the Red, after first settling in Vestfirðir, Eiríkr married Þjóðhildur Jǫrundardóttir and established the farm of Eiríksstaðir near Vatnshorn in Haukadalur. His son Leifr was likely born there, but Eiríkr had to leave the area after killing two men in revenge for the deaths of his thralls.

== Archaeological investigations ==
A number of archaeological investigations have been carried out at what is thought to be the site of Eiríksstaðir (now on the land of Stóra-Vatnshorn farm). In 1894 Brynjúlfur Jónsson made a plan of the visible signs of old buildings and they were excavated the following year by Þorsteinn Erlingsson. Daniel Bruun made a further investigation in 1896. An excavation in 1938 by Matthías Þórðarson uncovered a building of the longhouse type with a long central firepit. In 1997–2002, at the request of the Eiríksstaðanefnd (Eiríksstaðir committee), Guðmundur Ólafsson conducted a further investigation for the National Museum of Iceland.

=== Main building ===
The main building was of a longhouse type, and was measured in the 1997 dig at approximately 50 square metres (540 sq ft) in area and 14 metres (46 ft) long. There was a central hearth; this indicates that people sat along the walls. In the initial investigation in 1895, Þorsteinn Erlingsson thought there had been an attached bake-house at the rear, but the 1997 dig confirmed Mattías Þórðarson's belief that the rocks there were from a natural landslide. The walls were turf set on a base of rocks, and were about 1–1.5 metres (3.3–4.9 ft) thick; stones in the south wall indicate that it had been repaired. The building was simple in construction and indications are that it had not been occupied for long. C-14 dating of charcoal from an undisturbed area of human habitation deposits in front of the ruins yielded a date of the 9th–10th century.

=== Pit-house ===
In 2000 a pit-house was excavated in front of the main building. Among other finds in the floor were carved stone spindles of Norwegian manufacture. Guðmundur Ólafsson interprets this as having been a dyngja, a "bower" or women's work-room. It had previously been viewed as a bath-house or sauna (by Þorsteinn Erlingsson) and a kitchen or smokery (by Matthías Þórðarson).

== Open-air museum ==
The Eiríksstaðanefnd created an open-air museum based on the 1997 archaeological investigation. It aims to represent Erik the Red's home as accurately as possible; the longhouse was built in imitation of the excavated building, using driftwood and replica tools. The museum was created in 1999 and formally opened in 2000 in association with the celebration of the thousand-year anniversary of the discovery of Vinland. It is located approximately 100 metres (yards) from the actual ruins, which are a protected archaeological site.
