= Haukadalur (Dalabyggð) =

Valley in the Western Region of Iceland

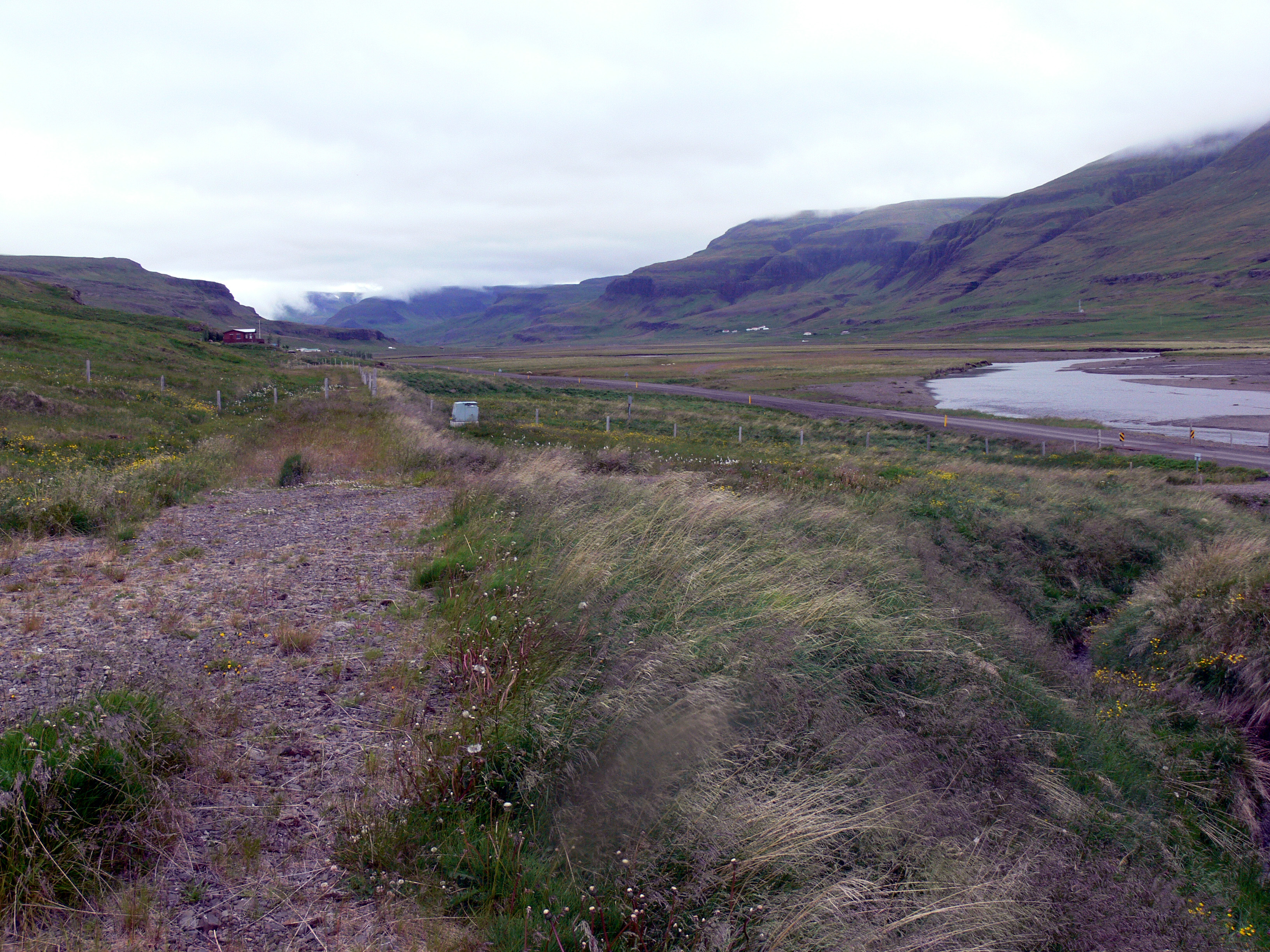
- Haukadalur Valley, looking east from Eiríksstaðir

- Location within Iceland

Geography
- Country: Iceland
- State/Province: Western Region
- Population center: Dalabyggð
- Coordinates: 65°3′22″N 21°30′40″W
- Interactive map of Haukadalur

Haukadalur is a valley in Dalabyggð municipality, found in the Western Region of Iceland. (Note: Historically the valley was located in Dalasýsla county.)

The valley is known as the likely birthplace of Leif Erikson, whose father, Erik the Red, established the farmstead Eiríksstaðir there around 970 AD. Other settlements within the valley include: Jörfi, Leikskálar, Saursstaðir, and Stóra-Vatnshorn.
