= Matthías Þórðarson =

Icelandic antiquarian (1877–1961)

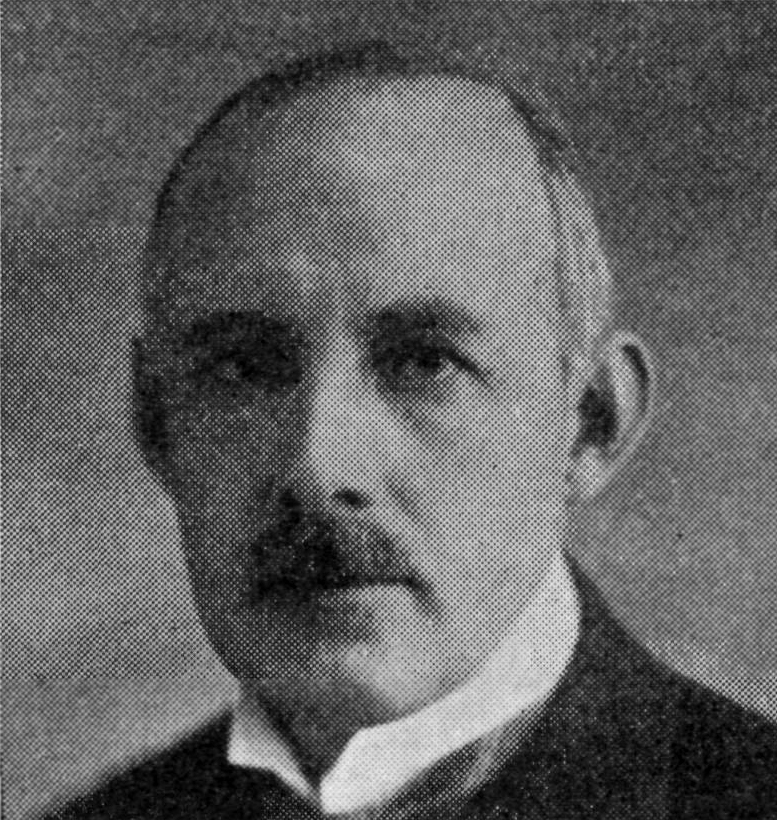
Matthías Þórðarson

Matthías Þórðarson (30 October 1877 – 29 December 1961) was the Icelandic State Antiquarian and Director of the National Museum of Iceland from 1908 to 1947. He became president of the Icelandic Literary Society in 1946 and held the position for the rest of his life. He designed the official flag of Iceland that was formally adopted in 1944.

== Bibliography ==
- Velkenshornet reliquiarium eller drikkehorn. 1917
- Fornleifar á Þingvelli: Búðir, lögrjetta og lögberg. 1922
- Íslenzkir listamenn. 1925
- Havets rigdomme og deres udnyttelse. 1927.
- Síldarsaga íslands með ritgjörð um eðlishætti síldarinnar og skýrslum um síldarafla. 1930.
- The Vinland Voyages. 1930
- Saga Alþingis. 1956.
