= Wainer Vaccari =

Italian artist and sculptor (born 1949)

Wainer Vaccari (born 1949 in Modena) is an Italian illustrator, painter and sculptor.

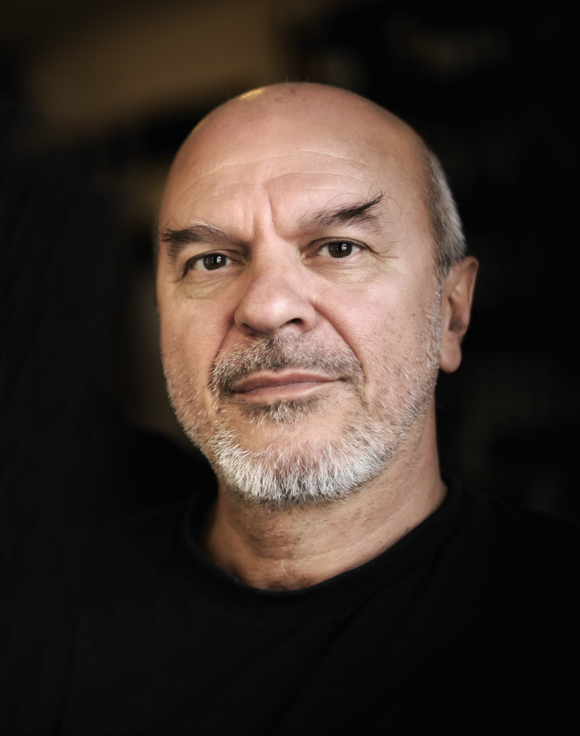
Wainer Vaccari

== Biography ==
Wainer Vaccari made his debut in the 1970s with an exhibition at the 'La Sfera' gallery. His career then experienced a turning point when he met the art dealer Emilio Mazzoli, for whom he organised a solo exhibition in Modena in 1983. The following year, Vaccari took part in two important group exhibitions: 'La scuola di Atene' in Acireale and the Biennale 'Trigon' exhibition in Graz, both curated by Achille Bonito Oliva.

During this period, his art lost the initial influence of the German New Objectivity and began to engage with the Mannerist art of 16th century Italy and the visionary figuration of the northern 19th century. The results of this research led Vaccari to expand his exhibition activities beyond the Italian borders and win the admiration of important European institutions. In the following ten years, his works were exhibited in private galleries, such as the Susan Wyss in Zurich, the Jule Kewenig in Frechen-Bachem (Cologne) and the Thomas Levy in Hamburg as well as in museums such as the one in Horsens, Denmark, the art gallery in Rotterdam, Netherlands, and the Kunstverein in Munich. His work also attracted the attention of the prestigious Stedelijk Museum in Amsterdam, which acquired one of his works entitled 'Tondo' in 1992. The end of the 1990s was characterised by several solo exhibitions that consolidated Vaccari's presence on the international art scene, such as in 1997 at Galerie Thomas in Munich and in the following two years at Galerie Numaga in Neuchâtel and at the Redfern Gallery in London.

But despite the positive response abroad, Vaccari maintained his contacts with Italy and had a solo exhibition at Galleria Civica in Modena in 1994, followed by three exhibitions between 1996 and 1997 at Galleria Forni in Bologna, at Galleria Goethe in Bolzano and at Galleria dello Scudo in Verona. In 1999, he was in Rome invited to the thirteenth edition of the Quadriennale. The year 2000 is indeed characterised by an intense exploration of the language of painting, which leads him to a profound rethinking of his own way of representation. The first results of this stylistic turnaround can be seen in the exhibitions at Galleria Emilio Mazzoli in Modena (2001), at Galleria Pack in Milan (2002), at the Museum of Modern Art in Passau, Austria (2003), at the Kunsthaus in Hamburg (2005) and at Galleria Bonelli in Mantua (2007).

In 2008 he took part in the Peking Biennale, while in 2011 he was among the artists exhibited in the Italian pavilion organised by Vittorio Sgarbi. Later in 2012, Vaccari's reflection on art was linked to an intense epistemological study that led the artist to a new fine-tuning of his own visual language and style.

Vaccari then took part in important group exhibitions both in Italy and abroad, including the 2013 exhibition in Schleswig 'Favourite Paintings from the Grosshaus Collection' at Gottorf Castle.

In 2015 he exhibited, again in Germany, at the Levy Gallery in Hamburg, while in 2017 he returned to Galleria Emilio Mazzoli in Modena for an important solo exhibition entitled 'Visioni diverse', curated by Flavio Arensi.

== Works in collections and public institutions ==
- More of his art pieces are exposed in famous institutions such as the Palazzo Chigi, the Parliament of Rome in Italy, the Stedelijk Museum in Amsterdam (Netherlands), the Horsenskunstmuseum in Horsens (Denmark) and the Musée d'art et d'histoire in Neuchâtel (Switzerland).
- The bronze sculpture 'Il camminante'. The Wanderer. is located in Modena on the Largo Mario Alberto Pucci in front of the Palazzina Pucci.
- A bronze statue of Carlo Parola's famous bicycle kick, from which he designed the logo for the Calciatori Panini albums, is located on the premises of the Panini kiosk in Piazza del Duomo, also in Modena.
- A Bronze statue entitled "Tuffatore" The Diver sold in 2024 in Hamburg to a private collector.
- The plastic prototype of his first artwork on elastic ceramic, entitled 'Pensiero di testa' (Head Thought), created for the first edition of the Festivalfilosofia, is on the wall in Piazzale Avanzini in Sassuolo.

== Other works ==
- Employed as a graphic designer by Panini in Modena, he created the drawing immortalising Carlo Parola's famous bicycle kick in 1970, based on a photograph by Corrado Bianchi, which became the logo and symbol of the Calciatori Panini album.
- In 1986 he designed the costumes for the dance theatre piece 'Tufo' by the group Sosta Palmizi, a production of the Centro in Teatro di Polverigi (Ancona).
- In 1995, Worshiping icons, a dance performance inspired by the works of Wainer Vaccari, was performed by the Dance Company of the Copenhagen Theatre with choreography by Warren Spears.
- He created the illustrations for the book Baggio Etrusco by Edizioni Limina, Arezzo 2005.
