= North Icelandic Benedictine School =

14th-century Icelandic literary movement

- Relationships between the major members of the North Icelandic Benedictine School

The North Icelandic Benedictine School (Norðlenski Benediktskólinn) is a fourteenth-century Icelandic literary movement, the lives, activities, and relationships of whose members are attested particularly by Laurentius saga biskups. This movement is characterised by an elaborate rhetorical style new to Icelandic saga-writing at the time (known in English as the 'florid style', Scandinavian as the florissante stil, and Icelandic as the skrúðstíll), with Latinate grammar, Latin and Low German loan-words; and, unusually for Icelandic sagas, which are usually anonymous, a close-knit network of identifiable authors (sometimes self-identified, sometimes named by others). The school is associated particularly with the Northern Icelandic Benedictine monasteries of Þingeyri and Munkaþverá in the diocese of Hólar, and with the students of Jón Halldórsson and Lárentíus Kálfsson.

The principal authors and works associated with this literary movement are:

- Árni Lárentíusson, author of Dunstanus saga (translated from the Latin life of the Anglo-Saxon Saint Dunstan).
- Arngrímr Brandsson, author of Guðmundar saga D, and possibly the translator of Thomas saga erkibyskups (the life of Thomas Becket).
- Bergr Sokkason, author of Nikulás saga erkibiskups (a translation of the life of St Nicholas) and Mikaels saga höfuðengils (the life of the Archangel Michael); and possibly the L-version of Jóns saga helga, Guðmundar saga C, and Jóns þáttr Halldórssonar. He or his associates may also have composed a substantial number of other sagas, such as Kirjalax saga, Rémundar saga keisarasonar, and Dínus saga drambláta.
- Einarr Hafliðason, translator of the miracle-story Atburð á Finnmörk and probably author of Laurentius saga and the Lögmannsannáll.
- Einarr Gilsson.

Among the various manuscripts which can be associated with the movement, the mid-fourteenth-century AM 657 a-b 4to is a good example: it is the oldest manuscript to contain the text of Bergr's Jóns þáttr Halldórssonar; it also contains stories miracles performed by the Virgin Mary; Bergr's Mikaels saga; Jón Halldórsson's Drauma-Jóns saga; Hákonar þáttr Hárekssonar; Jón Halldórsson's Clári saga; and several exempla.
