= Árni Lárentíusson =

Icelandic writer

Árni Lárentíusson (or Laurentiusson) is one of the few medieval Icelandic prose writers known by name, known to have translated Dunstanus saga.

== Life ==
Árni was born in 1304, the son of Lárentíus Kálfsson and his Norwegian concubine Þuríðr Árnadóttir af Borgundi. His biography is known largely from Einarr Hafliðason's biography of Lárentíus, Laurentius saga. After spending his childhood in Norway, Árni joined his father in Icelandic in 1315 and 1317, Árni and his father became monks at the monastery of Þingeyraklaustur, alongside the translator Bergr Sokkason, whose prose style seems to have influenced Árni's. Árni was consecrated by Jón Halldórsson, bishop of Skálholt, around 1325, and subsequently worked for his father, who by then was the bishop of Hólar. After this point, Árni's biography becomes obscure: it seems that Árni's behaviour won the disapproval of both his father and his father's biographer. It seems from a letter of 1337 sent from the monastery at Nidaros to Petrus Filipsson that Árni was at that time back in Norway and was seeking to work as a Dominican preacher in Jämtland. No more is known of Árni's activities.

== Works ==
Árni can be said to have been part of the North Icelandic Benedictine School, and to have been 'among the most productive, if not the most productive, scribes both in the north of Iceland and in Iceland as a whole'. In the words of Laurentius saga, 'var bróðir Árni hinn bezti klerkr ok versificator, ok kenndi mörgum klerkum' ('Brother Árni was the best scholar and poet, and taught many scholars'). He was the author of Dunstanus saga, perhaps fairly early in his ecclesiastical career: in Fell's analysis, 'the enthusiasm and carelessness of the writing, the eagerness to display irrelevant knowledge, and the uncertain hovering between precise translation and rhetorical flourish, suggest that the Dunstanus Saga was an early work, and may even have been an experimental one'. Árni is also thought possibly to be the author of Jóns saga helga.

== See also ==
- List of Icelandic writers
- Icelandic literature

== Sources ==
- Karl G. Johansson, 'Bergr Sokkason och Arngrímur Brandsson – översättare och författare i samma miljö', in Old Norse Myths, Literature and Society: Proceedings of the 11th International Saga Conference, 2–7 July 2000, University of Sydney, ed. by Geraldine Barnes and Margaret Clunies Ross (Sydney: The University of Sydney, Centre for Medieval Studies, 2000), pp. 181–97, rp-www.arts.usyd.edu.au/arts/.../181-johansson.pdf.
- Dunstanus Saga, ed. by C. E. Fell, Editiones Arnamagnaeanae, Series B, 5 (Copenhagen: Reitzel, 1963), pp. lix-lxiv.
- Peter Foote, ' Jóns saga helga ', in Kristni saga; Kristni þættir; Jóns saga ins helga, ed. by Sigurgeir Steingrímsson, Ólafur Halldórsson, and Peter Foote, Íslenzk fornrit, 15 (Reykjavík: Hið Íslenzka Fornritafélag, 2003), pp. ccxiii-cccxxi (p. ccxxix-ccxxxiii).
