= Saga =

Ancient Norse prose stories and histories

Sagas are prose stories and histories, composed in Iceland and to a lesser extent elsewhere in Scandinavia.

The most famous saga-genre is the sagas of Icelanders, which feature Viking voyages, migration to Iceland, and feuds between Icelandic families. However, sagas' subject matter is diverse, including pre-Christian Scandinavian legends; saints and bishops both from Scandinavia and elsewhere; Scandinavian kings and contemporary Icelandic politics; and chivalric romances either translated from Continental European languages or composed locally.

Sagas originated in the Middle Ages, but continued to be composed in the ensuing centuries. Whereas the dominant language of history-writing in medieval Europe was Latin, sagas were composed in the vernacular: Old Norse and its later descendants, primarily Icelandic.

While sagas are written in prose, they share some similarities with epic poetry, and often include stanzas or whole poems in alliterative verse embedded in the text.

== Etymology and meaning of saga ==
The main meanings of the Old Norse word saga (plural sǫgur) are 'what is said, utterance, oral account, notification' and the sense used in this article: '(structured) narrative, story (about somebody)'. It is cognate with the English words say and saw (in the sense 'a saying', as in old saw), and the German Sage; but the modern English term saga was borrowed directly into English from Old Norse by scholars in the eighteenth century to refer to Old Norse prose narratives.

The word continues to be used in this sense in the modern Scandinavian languages: Icelandic saga (plural sögur), Faroese søga (plural søgur), Norwegian soge (plural soger), Danish saga (plural sagaer), and Swedish saga (plural sagor). It usually also has wider meanings such as 'history', 'tale', and 'story'. It can also be used of a genre of novels telling stories spanning multiple generations, or to refer to saga-inspired fantasy fiction. Swedish folksaga means folk tale or fairy tale, while konstsaga is the Swedish term for a fairy tale by a known author, such as Hans Christian Andersen. In Swedish historiography, the term sagokung, "saga king", is intended to be ambiguous, as it describes the semi-legendary kings of Sweden, who are known only from unreliable sources.

== Genres ==
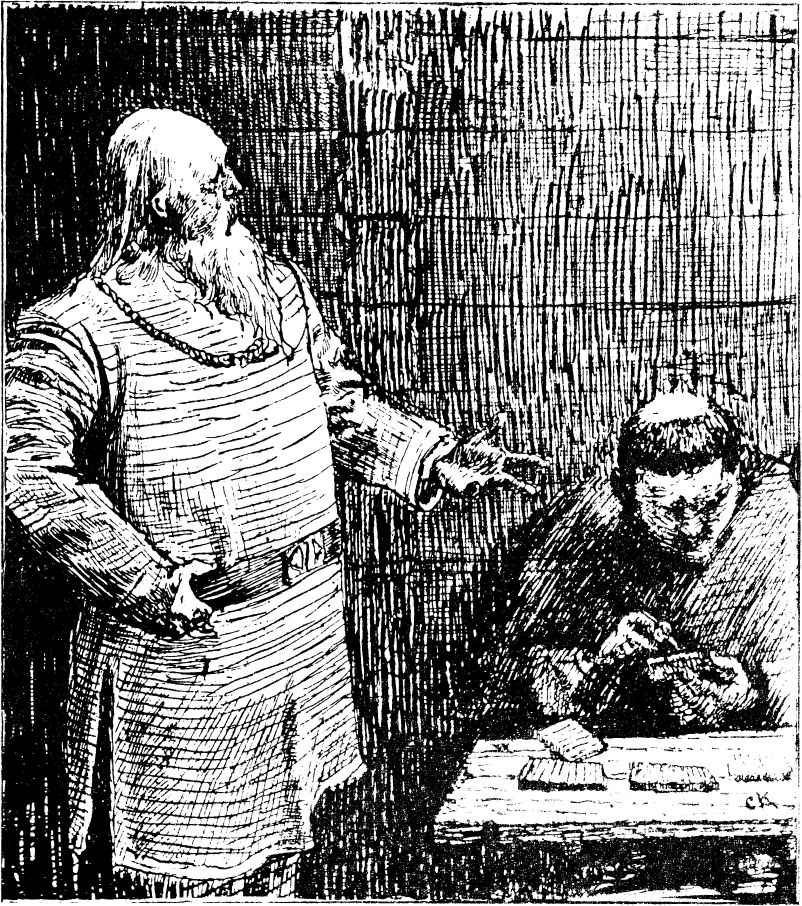
Snorri Sturluson, portrait by Christian Krohg: Illustration for Heimskringla 1899-Edition

Norse sagas are generally classified as follows.

=== Kings' sagas ===
Kings' sagas (konungasögur) are of the lives of Scandinavian kings. They were composed in the twelfth to fourteenth centuries. A pre-eminent example is Heimskringla, probably compiled and composed by Snorri Sturluson. These sagas frequently quote verse, invariably occasional and praise poetry in the form of skaldic verse.

=== Sagas of Icelanders and short tales of Icelanders ===
The Icelanders' sagas (Íslendingasögur), sometimes also called "family sagas" in English, are purportedly (and sometimes actually) stories of real events, which usually take place from around the settlement of Iceland in the 870s to the generation or two following the conversion of Iceland to Christianity in 1000. They are noted for frequently exhibiting a realistic style. It seems that stories from these times were passed on in oral form until they eventually were recorded in writing as Íslendingasögur, whose form was influenced both by these oral stories and by literary models in both Old Norse and other languages. The majority — perhaps two thirds of the medieval corpus — seem to have been composed in the thirteenth century, with the remainder in the fourteenth and fifteenth centuries. These sagas usually span multiple generations and often feature everyday people (e.g. Bandamanna saga) and larger-than-life characters (e.g. Egils saga). Key works of this genre have been viewed in modern scholarship as the highest-quality saga-writing. While primarily set in Iceland, the sagas follow their characters' adventures abroad, for example in other Nordic countries, the British Isles, northern France and North America. Some well-known examples include Njáls saga, Laxdæla saga and Grettis saga.

The material of the short tales of Icelanders (þættir or Íslendingaþættir) is similar to Íslendinga sögur, in shorter form, often preserved as episodes about Icelanders in the kings' sagas.

Like kings' sagas, when sagas of Icelanders quote verse, as they often do, it is almost invariably skaldic verse.

=== Contemporary sagas ===
Contemporary sagas (samtíðarsögur or samtímasögur) are set in twelfth- and thirteenth-century Iceland, and were written soon after the events they describe. Most are preserved in the compilation Sturlunga saga, from around 1270–80, though some, such as Arons saga Hjörleifssonar are preserved separately. The verse quoted in contemporary sagas is skaldic verse.

According to historian Jón Viðar Sigurðsson, "Scholars generally agree that the contemporary sagas are rather reliable sources, based on the short time between the events and the recording of the sagas, normally twenty to seventy years... The main argument for this view on the reliability of these sources is that the audience would have noticed if the saga authors were slandering and not faithfully portraying the past."

=== Legendary sagas ===
Legendary sagas (fornaldarsögur) blend remote history, set on the Continent before the settlement of Iceland, with myth or legend. Their aim is usually to offer a lively narrative and entertainment. They often portray Scandinavia's pagan past as a proud and heroic history. Some legendary sagas quote verse — particularly Vǫlsunga saga and Heiðreks saga — and when they do it is invariably Eddaic verse.

Some legendary sagas overlap generically with the next category, chivalric sagas.

=== Chivalric sagas ===
Chivalric sagas (riddarasögur) are translations of Latin pseudo-historical works and French chansons de geste as well as Icelandic compositions in the same style. Norse translations of Continental romances seem to have begun in the first half of the thirteenth century; Icelandic writers seem to have begun producing their own romances in the late thirteenth century, with production peaking in the fourteenth century and continuing into the nineteenth.

While often translated from verse, sagas in this genre almost never quote verse, and when they do it is often unusual in form: for example, Jarlmanns saga ok Hermanns contains the first recorded quotation of a refrain from an Icelandic dance-song, and a metrically irregular riddle in Þjalar-Jóns saga.

=== Saints' and bishops' sagas ===
Saints' sagas (heilagra manna sögur) and bishops' sagas (biskupa sögur) are vernacular Icelandic translations and compositions, to a greater or lesser extent influenced by saga-style, in the widespread genres of hagiography and episcopal biographies. The genre seems to have begun in the mid-twelfth century.

== History ==
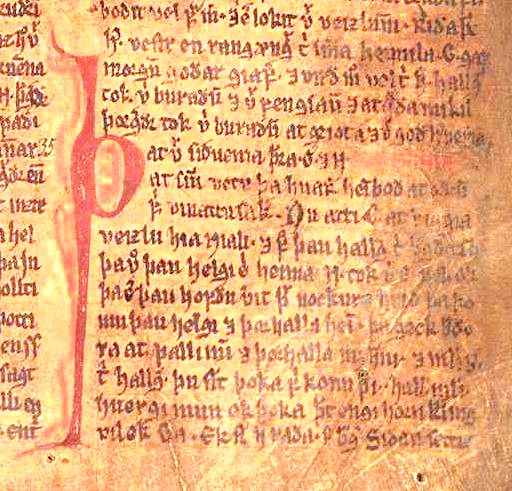
Excerpt from Njáls saga in the manuscript Möðruvallabók (AM 132 folio 13r) c. 1350.

Icelandic sagas are based on oral traditions and much research has focused on what is real and what is fiction within each tale. The accuracy of the sagas is often hotly disputed.

Most of the medieval manuscripts which are the earliest surviving witnesses to the sagas were taken to Denmark and Sweden in the seventeenth century, but later returned to Iceland. Classical sagas were composed in the thirteenth century. Scholars once believed that these sagas were transmitted orally from generation to generation until scribes wrote them down in the thirteenth century. However, most scholars now believe the sagas were conscious artistic creations, based on both oral and written tradition. A study focusing on the description of the items of clothing mentioned in the sagas concludes that the authors attempted to create a historic "feel" to the story, by dressing the characters in what was at the time thought to be "old fashioned clothing". However, this clothing is not contemporary with the events of the saga as it is a closer match to the clothing worn in the 12th century. It was only recently (start of 20th century) that the tales of the voyages to North America (modern day Canada) were authenticated.

Most sagas of Icelanders take place in the period 930–1030, which is called söguöld (Age of the Sagas) in Icelandic history. The sagas of kings, bishops, contemporary sagas have their own time frame. Most were written down between 1190 and 1320, sometimes existing as oral traditions long before, others are pure fiction, and for some we do know the sources: the author of King Sverrir's saga had met the king and used him as a source.

While sagas are generally anonymous, a distinctive literary movement in the 14th century involves sagas, mostly on religious topics, with identifiable authors and a distinctive Latinate style. Associated with Iceland's northern diocese of Hólar, this movement is known as the North Icelandic Benedictine School (Norðlenski Benediktskólinn).

The vast majority of texts referred to today as "sagas" were composed in Iceland. One exception is Þiðreks saga, translated/composed in Norway; another is Hjalmars och Hramers saga, a post-medieval forgery composed in Sweden. While the term saga is usually associated with medieval texts, sagas — particularly in the legendary and chivalric saga genres — continued to be composed in Iceland on the pattern of medieval texts into the nineteenth century.

=== Explanations for saga writing ===
Icelanders produced a high volume of literature relative to the size of the population. Historians have proposed various theories for the high volume of saga writing.

Early, nationalist historians argued that the ethnic characteristics of the Icelanders were conducive to a literary culture, but these types of explanations have fallen out of favor with academics in modern times. It has also been proposed that the Icelandic settlers were so prolific at writing in order to capture their settler history. Historian Gunnar Karlsson does not find that explanation reasonable though, given that other settler communities have not been as prolific as the early Icelanders were.

Pragmatic explanations were once also favoured: it has been argued that a combination of readily available parchment (due to extensive cattle farming and the necessity of culling before winter) and long winters encouraged Icelanders to take up writing.

More recently, Icelandic saga-production has been seen as motivated more by social and political factors.

The unique nature of the political system of the Icelandic Commonwealth created incentives for aristocrats to produce literature, offering a way for chieftains to create and maintain social differentiation between them and the rest of the population. Gunnar Karlsson and Jesse Byock argued that the Icelanders wrote the Sagas as a way to establish commonly agreed norms and rules in the decentralized Icelandic Commonwealth by documenting past feuds, while Iceland's peripheral location put it out of reach of the continental kings of Europe and that those kings could therefore not ban subversive forms of literature. Because new principalities lacked internal cohesion, a leader typically produced Sagas "to create or enhance amongst his subjects or followers a feeling of solidarity and common identity by emphasizing their common history and legends". Leaders from old and established principalities did not produce any Sagas, as they were already cohesive political units.

Later (late thirteenth- and fourteenth-century) saga-writing was motivated by the desire of the Icelandic aristocracy to maintain or reconnect links with the Nordic countries by tracing the ancestry of Icelandic aristocrats to well-known kings and heroes to which the contemporary Nordic kings could also trace their origins.

== Editions and translations ==
The corpus of Old Norse sagas is gradually being edited in the Íslenzk fornrit series, which covers all the Íslendingasögur and a growing range of other ones. Where available, the Íslenzk fornrit edition is usually the standard one. The standard edition of most of the chivalric sagas composed in Iceland is by Agnete Loth.

A list, intended to be comprehensive, of translations of Icelandic sagas is provided by the National Library of Iceland's Bibliography of Saga Translations.

== Popular culture ==
Many modern artists working in different creative fields have drawn inspiration from the sagas. Among some well-known writers, for example, who adapted saga narratives in their works are Poul Anderson, Laurent Binet, Margaret Elphinstone, Friedrich de la Motte Fouqué, Gunnar Gunnarsson, Henrik Ibsen, Halldór Laxness, Ottilie Liljencrantz, Henry Wadsworth Longfellow, George Mackay Brown, William Morris, Adam Oehlenschläger, Robert Louis Stevenson, August Strindberg, Rosemary Sutcliff, Esaias Tegnér, J.R.R. Tolkien, and William T. Vollmann.

== See also ==
- Prose Edda
- Beowulf

== Sources ==
Primary:

Other:

- Clover, Carol J. et al. Old Norse-Icelandic Literature: A critical guide (University of Toronto Press, 2005) ISBN 978-0802038234
- Gade, Kari Ellen (ed.) Poetry from the Kings' Sagas 2 From c. 1035 to c. 1300 (Brepols Publishers. 2009) ISBN 978-2-503-51897-8
- Gordon, E. V. (ed) An Introduction to Old Norse (Oxford University Press; 2nd ed. 1981) ISBN 978-0-19-811184-9
- Jakobsson, Armann; Fredrik Heinemann (trans) A Sense of Belonging: Morkinskinna and Icelandic Identity, c. 1220 (Syddansk Universitetsforlag. 2014) ISBN 978-8776748456
- Jakobsson, Ármann Icelandic sagas (The Oxford Dictionary of the Middle Ages 2nd Ed. Robert E. Bjork. 2010) ISBN 9780199574834
- McTurk, Rory (ed) A Companion to Old Norse-Icelandic Literature and Culture (Wiley-Blackwell, 2005) ISBN 978-0631235026
- Ross, Margaret Clunies The Cambridge Introduction to the Old Norse-Icelandic Saga (Cambridge University Press, 2010) ISBN 978-0-521-73520-9
- Thorsson, Örnólfur The Sagas of Icelanders (Penguin. 2001) ISBN 978-0141000039
- Whaley, Diana (ed.) Poetry from the Kings' Sagas 1 From Mythical Times to c. 1035 (Brepols Publishers. 2012) ISBN 978-2-503-51896-1
