= Bergr Sokkason =

14th century Icelandic monk and scholar

Bergr Sokkason was an Icelandic monk, abbot and scholar, who flourished in the earlier fourteenth century. In 1316 he became a monk of the monastery of Þingeyrar before moving to the monastery of Munkaþverá, where he became prior in 1322 and abbot from 1325–34 and again from 1345, apparently to 1350. It is not known when Bergr died: the last known mention of him is in 1345.

Bergr was a close friend of Lárentíus Kálfsson and Einarr Hafliðason and seems to have been one of the most prolific identifiable authors of medieval Iceland, making him a central figure in the North Icelandic Benedictine School of saga-writing: he wrote Nikulás saga erkibiskups and Mikaels saga höfuðengils; possibly Guðmundar saga C, the L-version of Jóns saga helga, and Jóns þáttr Halldórssonar; and maybe even a number of romances: Kirjalax saga, Rémundar saga keisarasonar, and Dínus saga drambláta. It has recently been argued that he also composed the B-version of Þorláks saga helga, preserved in the mid-fifteenth-century manuscript AM 382 4to.

== See also ==
- List of Icelandic writers
- Icelandic literature

== Sources ==
- Sigurdson, Erika Ruth, "The Church in Fourteenth-Century Iceland: Ecclesiastical Administration, Literacy, and the Formation of an Elite Clerical Identity" (unpublished Ph.D. thesis, University of Leeds, 2011), pp. 55–56, 60-61, 63
- Finnur Jónsson: Historia Ecclesiastica Islandiæ IV, bls. 44-45, Havniæ MDCCLXXVIII.
- Páll Eggert Ólason: Íslenzkar æviskrár I, bls. 150, Reykjavík 1948.
