= Ormr Ásláksson =

Roman Catholic bishop

Ormr Ásláksson was Bishop of Hólar, Iceland's northern diocese, from 1343–56.

== Biography ==
Ormr was a Norwegian, who prior to his election had been a canon of the cathedral of Stavanger from at least 1319, in which role he oversaw the collection of the papal tithe under the papal nuncio Pierre Gervais in c. 1333. Ormr succeeded Egill Eyjólfsson (Bishop of Hólar 1332–41) (with Einarr Hafliðason managing the empty seat in between). Ormr is noted for the tempestuous character of his episcopate, which has sometimes been thought to show Icelanders' opposition to Norwegian bishops. During his episcopate, he made an unusual four journeys to Norway, in 1345–46, 1347, 1349–51, and 1355–56. In 1347, Icelandic farmers protested about his governance to the Norwegian king, Haakon VI Magnusson via the Alþingi. However, most of the evidence for opposition to Ormr comes from one source, Einarr Hafliðason, so may not be representative.

Ormr promoted the cult of Guðmundr Arason, arranging for the second translation of his bones in 1344. It was probably under Ormr's auspices that Arngrímr Brandsson composed the D-version of Guðmundar saga biskups.

On his death in 1356, Ormr was succeeded by Jón skalli Eiríksson.

== See also ==
- Catholic Church in Iceland
