= Bishops' saga =

Genre of saga

The bishops' saga (Old Norse and modern Icelandic biskupasaga, modern Icelandic plural biskupasögur, Old Norse plural biskupasǫgur) is a genre of medieval Icelandic sagas, mostly thirteenth- and earlier fourteenth-century prose histories dealing with bishops of Iceland's two medieval dioceses of Skálholt and Hólar.

== Sagas about Skálholt bishops ==
- Hungrvaka (short biographies of the first five bishops of Skálholt, 1056–1176)
- Þorláks saga helga (three redactions, including the earliest of the biskupa sögur)
- Páls saga biskups (the saga of Þorlákr's successor Páll Jónsson, d. 1211)
- Árna saga biskups (composed c. 1300 about Árni Þorláksson, d. 1298)

Two þættir are also relevant: Ísleifs þáttr biskups and Jóns þáttr Halldórssonar.

== Sagas about Hólar bishops ==
- Jóns saga helga (about Jón Ögmundsson, 1052–1121, in several different versions)
- Guðmundar saga biskups (about Guðmundur Arason, 1161–1237, in several different versions)
- Laurentius Saga (the latest of the biskupa sögur, about Lárentíus Kálfsson, 1267–31)

Several of the Hólar sagas are associated with the North Icelandic Benedictine School which flourished in the fourteenth century.

== Editions ==
- The principal modern edition of these sagas is Biskupa sögur, Íslenzk fornrit, 15-17 (Reykjavík: Hið Íslenzka Fornritafélag, 2002–3).
- Biskupa sögur. Vol. 1. Kaupmannahöfn [Copenhagen]: Hið íslenska bókmenntafélag. 1858.
- Biskupa sögur. Vol. 2. Kaupmannahöfn [Copenhagen]: Hið íslenska bókmenntafélag. 1878.
- A number of these sagas are edited and translated in Gudbrand Vigfusson; Powell, F. York (1905). Origines Islandicae: A collection of the more important sagas and other native writings relating to the settlement and early history of Iceland. Vol. 1. Oxford: Clarendon Press.

== Sources ==
Ásdís Egilsdóttir (1993). "Biskupa sögur". In Pulsiano, Phillip; Wolf, Kirsten (eds.). Medieval Scandinavia: An encyclopedia. New York: Garland. pp. 45–46. ISBN 0824047877.
