= Egill Eyjólfsson =

Roman Catholic bishop

Egill Eyjólfsson (1295–1341) was the bishop of Iceland's northern diocese of Hólar from the death of his predecessor, Lárentíus Kálfsson, in 1331, until his own death in 1341.

== Biography ==
Egill's father was Eyjólfur, a gold-smith, and his mother Þorgerður Egilsdóttir.

Egill studied at the monastery of Þingeyri, being taught alongside Einarr Hafliðason by Lárentíus Kálfsson. Egill first became a deacon, was then consecrated as a priest in 1318, and around the same time became the schoolmaster at Hólar. At that time, the bishop of Hólar was Auðunn rauði Þorbergsson, whose relationship with the monks of Þingeyri (not least Lárentíus) was very strained. According to Laurentius Saga, it was through Egill's efforts that in the autumn of 1319, Auðun and Lárentíus made peace.

Egill subsequently held the benefice of Grímstungur in Vatnsdalur, and in 1324 received the benefice of Grenjaðarstaðir in Aðaldalur (the wealthiest in the diocese of Hólar) from Archbishop Eilif Arnesson Kortin. Around 1327, Bishop Lárentius sent Egill to the Archbishop to plead Lárentíus‘s case against the monks of Möðruvellir. After Lárentíus's death in 1331, Egill was elected bishop of Hólar. Little is known about his episcopate, though it is said that the diocese's finances were well managed under his governance.

Egill was succeeded as bishop by Ormr Ásláksson.

== See also ==
- Catholic Church in Iceland

== Sources ==
- Páll Eggert Ólason: Íslenskar æviskrár I.
- Þorsteinn Gunnarsson (ritstj.): Um Auðunarstofu, bls. 184.
- Sigurdson, Erika Ruth, 'The Church in Fourteenth-Century Iceland: Ecclesiastical Administration, Literacy, and the Formation of an Elite Clerical Identity' (unpublished Ph.D. thesis, University of Leeds, 2011)
- Download The Church in Fourteenth-Century Iceland
