= Drauma-Jóns saga =

14th-century Icelandic saga

Drauma-Jóns saga (the story of Dream-Jón) is one of the medieval Icelandic chivalric sagas, written in Old Norse around the early fourteenth century. It is a comparatively short work compared to others of the genre, and is really more an exemplum than a saga, similar in this respect to the chivalric saga Clarus saga and the ævintýri ('exempla') associated with Jón Halldórsson. The work has been attributed to the monk Bergr Sokkason, abbot of Munkaþverá; at any rate it seems characteristic of the work of the North Icelandic Benedictine School. It was a very popular story, to judge by the number of surviving manuscripts discovered: five on parchment and 45 on paper, with one prominent manuscript being AM 510 4to. The tale may have Oriental origins.

== Synopsis ==
Kalinke and Mitchell summarise the saga thus:

The saga relates the fortunes of Jón, a young farmer, who has the gift not only of interpreting dreams, but of divining the dreams of others before they are told. Earl Heinrekr of Saxland, who also interprets dreams, envies Jon's superior ability. By eating Jón's heart, the earl hopes to acquire Jón's gift, so he commands his wife Ingibjǫrg to murder Jón in his sleep, cut out his heart, and prepare it as food for a meal. Ingibjǫrg spares Jón, however, and substitutes the heart of a dog. A waxen image of Jón is buried in his stead. The earl's treachery comes to light when his brother-in-law, the emperor of Saxland, arrives seeking interpretation of an unusual dream. He learns the truth about Jón from Ingibjǫrg. Subsequently, the earl is banished, while Jón receives the earldom and weds Ingibjǫrg.

== Manuscripts ==
The three earliest manuscripts of the saga, all dating from c. 1400, are AM 335 4°, AM 567 4°, and AM 657 4°. All appear to derive independently from an earlier version of the saga, as do many of the later manuscripts. A complete stemma has not been formulated. Kalinke and Mitchell identified the following manuscripts of the saga:

- Arnamagnæan Institute, Copenhagen:
  - AM 397, fol. (late 18th c)
  - AM 335, 4° (ca. 1400), vellum
  - AM 510,4° (late 15th c), vellum
  - AM 567, 4° (early 15th c), vellum, 1 leaf
  - AM 575b, 4° (late 17th c)
  - AM 657 a-b, 4° (late 14th c), vellum, defective ending
  - AM 123, 8° (ca. 1600), vellum, defective beginning
  - Rask 32 (late 18th c)
  - Rask 35 (18th c.)
- Royal Library, Copenhagen:
  - Kall 614, 4° (18th c.)
- The British Library, London:
  - Add. 4860, fol. (18th c)
  - Add. 24,969, fol. (ca. 1731)
- National Library, Reykjavik:
  - Lbs 679, 4° (ca. 1834)
  - Lbs 715, 4° (1670–80)
  - Lbs 878, 4° (1886–87)
  - Lbs 998, 4° (ca. 1860)
  - Lbs 1492, 4° (1880–1905)
  - Lbs 1626, 4° (1883)
  - Lbs 1637, 4° (ca. 1780)
  - Lbs 1656, 4° (1884–85)
  - Lbs 2152, 4° (late 19th c)
  - Lbs 2319, 4° (1727–29)
  - Lbs 3128, 4° (1885), resumé
  - Lbs 3165, 4° (1870–71)
  - Lbs 4491, 4° (1885)
  - Lbs 479, 8° (ca. 1800)
  - Lbs 1137, 8° (19th c)
  - Lbs 1726, 8° (1769)
  - Lbs 1783, 8° (1780)
  - Lbs 2041, 8° (ca. 1780-90)
  - Lbs 2232, 8° (18th–19th c)
  - Lbs 2319, 8° (late 18th c)
  - Lbs 2484, 8° (ca. 1852)
  - Lbs 2892, 8° (18th–19th c)
  - Lbs 3713, 8° (18th–19th c)
  - Lbs 4008, 8°
  - JS 27, fol. (ca. 1670)
  - JS 29, fol. (1782–90)
  - JS 87, 4° (1780–90)
  - JS 635, 4° (17th-19th c)
  - JS 47, 8° (ca. 1840)
  - IB 210, 4° (1841)
  - IB 277, 4° (1833–34)
  - IB 162, 8° (1840)
  - IB 184, 8° (18th–19th c)
  - IB 224, 8° (ca. 1750)
  - IBR 41, 8° (19th c)
  - IBR 42, 8° (19th c)
- Stofnun Arna Magnússonar, Reykjavik
  - Uncat. MS. "Þáttur af Drauma-Jóni" (1912)
- Private Collection, Iceland
  - Sveinn Björnsson, Hvammur, Dalir: MS. 1 (ca. 1880)
- Royal Library, Stockholm:
  - Papp. fol. nr 1 (early 17th c)
  - Papp. fol. no. 47 (1690–91)
  - Papp. 4:o nr 15 (late 17th c)
  - Papp. 4:o nr 22 (17th c)

== Editions and translations ==
- Gering, Hugo, ed. "Drauma-Jóns saga." Zeitschrift für deutsche Philologie, 26 (1894), 289-309, https://archive.org/details/zeitschriftfrdph26berluoft. A critical edition in normalised Old Norse spelling based on AM 335 4°, AM 510 4°, AM 657 4° and AM 567 4°, characterised by Page as 'not free from misreadings'.
- 'Drauma-Jons saga', in Riddarasögur, ed. by Bjarni Vilhjálmsson, 6 vols (Reykjavík: Íslendingasagnaútgáfan, 1949-1951), vi 147-70. A modern-spelling version of Gering's text.
- Page, R. I., ed. 'Drauma-Jóns saga', Nottingham Medieval Studies, 1 (1957), 22-56, doi:10.1484/J.NMS.3.442. A diplomatic edition based on AM 335 4°, with complete variants from AM 657 4° and AM 567 4°, and selected variants from AM 657 4°, AM 567 4°, and AM 123 8°.
