= Arngrímr Brandsson =

Icelandic cleric and writer

Arngrímr Brandsson (died 13 October 1361) was an Icelandic cleric and writer.

Arngrímr‘s early life and career has long been the subject of debate; the evidence for it is sometimes contradictory. The synthesis of the evidence by Jón Helgason is widely seen as the most convincing. In this account, Arngrímr was consecrated as a secular priest, held the benefice of Oddi, and served Bishop Jón Halldórsson of Skálholt. In 1341, he took holy orders, possibly in Þykkvibær. He certainly became abbot of the monastery of Þingeyraklaustur in 1351, a position which he held until his death. Arngrímr supported the otherwise unpopular Bishop Ormr Ásláksson, during whose episcopate Arngrímr rose to the position of officialis of Iceland's northern diocese of Hólar, which he held from 1347 to 1351 and again from 1354 to 1357.

Arngrímr is now most noted for making the latest and longest version of Guðmundar saga biskups, known as version D, probably at Ormr Ásláksson‘s request, and in conjunction with Bishop Guðmundur Arason's exhumation in 1344. Arngrímr also composed a drápa in honour of the bishop, alongside that composed by Einarr Gilsson. He can be seen as part of the North Icelandic Benedictine School of saga-writing.

== See also ==
- List of Icelandic writers
- Icelandic literature

== Sources ==
- Sigurdson, Erika Ruth, 'The Church in Fourteenth-Century Iceland: Ecclesiastical Administration, Literacy, and the Formation of an Elite Clerical Identity' (unpublished Ph.D. thesis, University of Leeds, 2011), pp. 57–60, http://etheses.whiterose.ac.uk/2610/ (pre-Reformation bishops).
