= Black Death in Norway =

14th-century plague pandemic

1346–1353 spread of the Black Death in Europe map

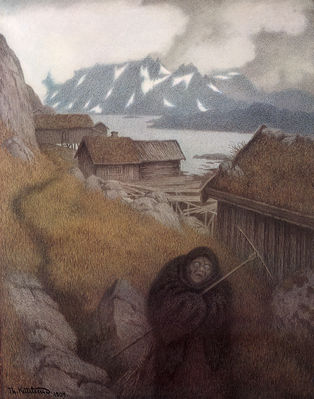
She Is Making Her Way Through the Country (Hun Farer Landet Rundt). An illustration of the Black Death.

The Black Death was present in Norway between 1349 and 1350.

In traditional Norwegian history, the Black Death is given major importance, as an explanation for the deterioration of Norway from an independent nation in the early 14th century, to its loss of political independence in the Kalmar Union in the late century, which caused Norway to lose political and economic independence and become a Danish "province" for centuries onward.

While the exact number of deaths from the Black Death is unknown, it is clear that the plague caused a demographic shock. The population did not recover to pre-pandemic levels until the 17th century.

== Background ==
=== Norway in the mid-14th century ===
Norway was partially feudalized during the mid-14th century. Peasants were considered free individuals, owning approximately one half of the land used for agriculture. Land was controlled by contracts to noblemen and bishops given directly by the king.

During this time period, Norway was about 135,000 square miles (350,000 km^{2}), with approximately 350,000 residents. It is estimated that only 15,000 of these individuals lived in urban areas during the mid-14th century.

As the population grew, settlements that did reside in the mountains were required to focus on animal husbandry for food. Grain was often in deficit because of the short growing period, forcing the settlers to trade more than people who resided in lower altitudes. Norway was therefore required to establish trade routes from the coast to inland areas.

=== Farm abandonment in Norway before the mid-14th century ===
Long before the mid-14th century Black Death, Norway's countryside held farms in and amongst the mountains. Before the mid-14th century Black Death, there are accounts of people venturing out and seeing almost all of the farms abandoned. These accounts show that crises were occurring decades before the plague. Researchers within the past one hundred years believe the climatic deterioration of the lands around the Middle Ages was a large factor in the severity of the plague. Some Norwegian historians believe that the Black Death was the only cause of population loss and abandonment of farms around Norway in the late Middle Ages. This is disproven by a letter from 1340 in which a person who was leasing a farm at the time outside of Bergen, Norway that was abandoned approximately a decade before. To further support researchers' claims, Diplomatarium Norvegicum, a major collection of Norwegian letters and documents of the medieval period, contains numerous accounts of abandoned farms well before the plague.

As early as around 1280 but mostly 1300 is when historians expected the farm abandonment of Norway to occur. The climate of Norway and most of Europe underwent the early 1300s Little Ice Age. The Little Ice Age was a time of regional cooling that took place right around 1300. Norway experienced colder winters during the Little Ice Age, which was on and off from 1300 to 1850 with varying severity.

=== The Black Death ===
Since the outbreak of the Black Death at the Crimea, it had reached Sicily by an Italian ship from the Crimea. After having spread across the Italian states, and from Italy to France, Spain and England, the plague reached Norway by a plague ship from England in the summer of 1349. According to more than one hundred studies of the Black Death in Norway, scholars have estimated that up to sixty percent of the population in Norway died due to the Black Death from the summer of 1349 through winter of 1350. The significance of the major loss in Norway caused outbreak into Europe and Asia during the mid-14th century.

== Plague migration ==
=== Western Norway ===
The bubonic plague pandemic known as the Black Death reached Bergen in Norway by ship from England in late summer (probably August) of 1349, and spread from Bergen North to Trondheim in the autumn of 1349.

The Black Death in Norway is famously described in the unique and detailed contemporary Icelandic sources Gotskálks-annál and Lögmanns-annál by Einarr Hafliðason.

The Lögmanns-annál provides information about the migration of the Black Death in Western Norway. It contains the witness statements of the Icelandic Bishops Orm of Hólar and Gyrd Ivarsson of Skalholt, who visited Norway when the plague arrived from England and returned to Iceland when it had left Norway again in 1351. In this testimony, it is described how the infamous "Plague ship" arrived to Bergen in Norway from England. When the cargo was unloaded from the ship, the ship crew started to die. Shortly after, the inhabitants of Bergen started to die, and from Bergen it continued all over Norway, ultimately killing a third of the population. The ship from England reportedly was sunk, but several plague ships were said to have stranded along the beaches in the same fashion.

The Gotskálks-annál names a number of the victims of the plague, among whom were several members of the clergy, an account that can be verified by other sources. It also states that the plague migrated from Bergen north to Nidaros in 1349.

Additional information is found from wills, contracts, and other documents from the period of the plague. Because of this, the plague in Western Norway is better documented than in Sweden, Denmark, and Finland (the plague did not reach Iceland until 1402).

=== Eastern Norway ===
In contrast to the famous and documented plague migration in Western Norway, the migration of the plague in Eastern Norway is only indirectly documented, as there are no direct references to it or testimonies similar to the one in Western Norway. Because of the great focus on Western Norway, it was long believed that the plague migrated only from Bergen to the rest of the country.

By the data from the plague deaths in Oslo, it appears that Oslo was in fact reached by the plague before Bergen: already in May or June 1349, with the difference that there are no witness accounts from its progress in contrast to Western Norway.

The plague is likely to have reached Oslo by sea in the spring or early summer of 1349, presumably by ship. From Oslo, it migrated North toward Hamar, West toward Valdres in Central Norway, South West toward Stavanger, and to the East toward Sweden. The Black Death appear not to have reached Stavanger in the South from Bergen, because the first plague deaths are not noted there until 1350, and it likely migrated to it from Oslo.

=== Northern Norway ===
It is unknown whether the Black Death reached Northern Norway. However, the fact that Trondenes Church was built in the late 14th century or early 15th century, when the rest of Norway abandoned churches because of the population loss rather than build new ones, indicate that the plague did not reach this part of the nation.

== Consequences ==
In traditional history, the Black Death has played a major role as the explanation to why Norway lost its position as a major Kingdom in the early 14th century, and entered a many centuries-long period of stagnation as the most neglected of the Kingdoms of the Kalmar Union under Denmark in the late 14th century. Norway entered into a union with Denmark under Margarete I. in 1380 which turned into the Kalmar Union with Sweden joining 1397, initially as an equal Kingdom under a personal union but from 1537 as a puppet state under Denmark: it was transferred to a personal union under Sweden in 1814, and was not to regain its status as an independent nation until 1905. This period known as the 400 Years of Darkness was a traumatic period of stagnation, exploitation and lack of development under foreign power, and a major contributing factor to this has been attributed to the Black Death, and the population loss caused by it.

That Norway did experience a demographic shock is clearly documented. Of the 36.500 farms and 60.000 households that existed around the year 1300, 16.000 farms and 23.000 households existed in 1520, and the population in 15th-century Norway is estimated to have been less than half of what it had been in 1300. Between 60 and 65 percent of the population are estimated to have died during the Black Death, and Norway was not to recover until the 17th century. However, this is not enough to attribute the political decline of Norway: England also lost about 60 or 65 percent of its population to the Black Death, and Sweden also did not recover until the 17th century.

What may however support the traditional explanation that the Black Death caused the political decline of Norway was the fact that the death toll among the social elite classes appears to have been much higher in Norway than in both Sweden and England, contributing to a smaller class which could protect Norway's role and independence toward the dominance of foreign elites during the Kalmar Union.

It appears that the death toll was large in all the elite classes in Norwegian society, contributing to the Norwegian loss of independence under the Kalmar Union in several areas. This is clear when the comparison is made to Sweden, which also became a part of the Kalmar Union under Denmark, but who unlike Norway managed to protect their rights much better toward Denmark because of the strong Swedish nobility. While all Bishops survived the Black Death in Sweden, all Bishops in Norway died in the plague with the exception of the Bishop of Oslo: in 1371, it was noted that of the 300 priests in Norway prior to the plague, only 40 were left. The Norwegian class of officials appear to have experienced heavy losses, as the King was forced to concentrate those left to the Southern provinces to restore order while leaving the Northern provinces to themselves, and in 1351–52, a report stated that the tax to the Pope was impossible to collect in Norway because the administration had broken down and a great lack organization existed there because of the plague.

The diminished Norwegian nobility was not able to protect the political rights of Norway in the Kalmar Union and the military power was lost to Denmark who used mercenaries from Germany; the Norwegian merchant class lost their power of the Norwegian economy to the German merchants of the Hanseatic League who established themselves in Bergen; and the dead Norwegian officials were replaced by German and Danish officials appointed to administer Norway for Denmark; all of which has been described as the decline of Norway under the Danish dominance of the Kalmar Union.

== Plague legends ==
Legends surrounding plague in Norway are plentiful. These legends traveled to surrounding countries, each changing the story slightly to fit their beliefs.

The previously mentioned plague ship, which allegedly floated into the city of Bergen is often cited by historians as the inciting incident for the plague infection of Norway. One legend from Norway tells of the plague "wandering around the country", boarding a ship and jumping out to kill the crew once at sea, causing the ship to wash up in Bergen. The townspeople are said to have investigated the ship, falling dead soon after.

However, this has only been found in legends, leading some to believe that the ship was an exaggeration, or nonexistent. It is considered by many to have been extremely unlikely for a ship with no living crew to make it into Bergen. The city is made up of multiple fjords, protected by the ocean by a complex chain of islands linking the coast. What many argue to be more likely is that a ship washed up on the Norwegian coast, which a common Swedish legend tells about.

Some historians believe that the Norwegian legend of a ghost ship in Bergen originally came from Denmark, and the Norwegian version is an exaggerated retelling. Denmark legends surrounding a plague ship indicate that a ship from the Hanseatic trade routes, especially a ship that came from England, likely caused the plague outbreaks to originate in the southern part of Scandinavia, rather than the western coast.

Kristensen lists several types of plague legends, with one of the most prevalent being about one lone survivor, or two survivors (a man and woman) who repopulate a decimated town.

Bells and fire were among other common themes in plague legends of the region. Bells may be related to church bells chiming to honor the dead. Some historians believe that the bells and fire were to attract survivors to the area. Fire may have also been used because it was believed that fire could destroy the plague. There is one Norwegian legend of a couple burning their house with their plague-infected children inside. Yet another legend from Norway recounts killing an innocent man as a sacrifice. This stopped the plague from coming into the town as "[t]he epidemic could not come over the body of the innocent man."

Animal forms were another common manifestation of the plague in popular legends. White horses, seen as unusual, were a popular choice in plague folklore, acting as a personification of the plague. Three legged goats were also a popular animal manifestation of the plague, as goats often portrayed the devil in Scandinavian folk stories. The goat having three legs therefore symbolizes both oddities as a bad omen, and the plague being connected to the devil.

In addition to animals, foreigners such as merchants or traveling women can be found in folklore portraying the plague.
