= Jónas Kristjánsson =

Jónas Kristjánsson (10 April 1924 – 7 June 2014) was an Icelandic scholar and novelist, and one-time director of the Árni Magnússon Institute for Icelandic Studies. In this position, he played a crucial role in the return of Icelandic manuscripts to Iceland from Denmark, representing Iceland in negotiations with the Danish authorities from 1972-86.

== Career ==
Jónas was a teacher at the Samvinnuskóli from 1952–55, archivist at the National Archives of Iceland from 1957–63, and the director of the Árni Magnússon Institute for Icelandic Studies from 1972-94 (from which position he retired upon reaching the age limit). He spent 1978-79 in the UK. Jónas was also a member of the Norwegian Academy of Science and Letters. On 31 May 1991 he received an honorary doctorate from the Faculty of Humanities at Uppsala University, Sweden.

== Works ==
Jónas was best known for his works on Icelandic sagas, laying emphasis on their literary nature and working on several stylistic and syntactic problems. His 1972 doctoral thesis, Um fóstbræðra sögu presented new arguments about the dating of Fóstbræðra saga (arguing that it was not, as had previously been thought, relatively archaic, but relatively late).

Jónas was an important editor of Icelandic texts, namely Dínus saga drambláta, Viktors saga ok Blávus, and a number of sagas for the Íslenzk fornrit series, on whose editorial board he sat from 1979, including Svarfdæla saga, overseeing the editions of the biskupa sögur with Þórður Ingi Guðjónsson, and co-editing the 2014 edition of the Poetic Edda with Vésteinn Ólason.

Jónas wrote two historical novels, one of which, The Wide World, is set in Viking age North America, and he translated Will Durant's The Life of Greece and Arthur Miller's Death of a Salesman into Icelandic.
