= Karl Jónsson =

Icelandic writer and clergyman (1135–1213)

- Born: 1135
- Died: 1213 (aged 77–78)
- Occupation: Abbot
- Notable work: Sverris saga

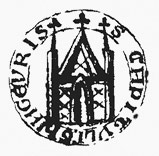
Signet of the Thingeyrar monastery, Iceland, 15th century

Karl Jónsson (1135–1213) was an Icelandic writer, poet and clergyman.

== Biography ==
Karl Jónsson was abbot of the Thingeyrar monastery (Icelandic: Þingeyrarklaustur) dating from 1169 until 1181. In 1185. he traveled to Norway where he attended the court of King Sverre of Norway. Later Karl Jónsson became the author of Sverris saga. The Saga became a primary source of information concerning the reign of King Sverre. The work additionally contains relevant facts for this period in the history of Norway.

The Benedictine monastery of Thingeyrar was founded in 1133 by Jón Ögmundsson, Bishop of Hólar. The Thingeyrar Monastery was located in Austur-Húnavatnssýsla, (eastern part of Húnavatnssýslur), in Northwestern Iceland. During the medieval period, the monastery of Thingeyrar was an important literary center as well as one of the major centers of culture and education in Iceland.

== See also ==
- Medieval literature
- Kings' sagas

== Sources ==
- Hermannsson, Halldó (2009) Bibliography of the sagas of the kings of Norway and related sagas and tales (BiblioBazaar) ISBN 978-1113624611
- Jakobsson, Ármann (2005) (2004) A Companion to Old Norse-Icelandic Literature and Culture (Blackwell Publishing) ISBN 9780631235026
- Karlsson, Gunnar (2000) Iceland's 1100 Years : History of a Marginal Society (London: C. Hurst & Co.) ISBN 1-85065-420-4
- Thorsson, Örnólfur (2000) The Sagas of the Icelanders: A Selection (Penguin Putnam) ISBN 0-14-100003-1

== Related Reading ==
- Saga Um Sverre Magnus Sigurdsson, Noregs Konung (Karl Jónsson, author. Nabu Press. 2013) ISBN 978-1294375296
