= Guðmundar saga biskups =

Icelandic bishops' saga

Guðmundar saga biskups or Guðmundar saga Arasonar is an Icelandic bishops' saga, existing in several different versions, recounting the life of Bishop Guðmundur Arason (1161–1237). Since the saga survives in different versions, it is common to speak of it in the plural, as Guðmundar sögur (rather than Guðmundar saga).

== History of the versions ==
The first version, known as the Prestssaga Guðmundar byskups, was composed soon after Guðmundur's death in 1237, possibly at the instigation of abbot Lambkárr Þorgilsson (d. 1249). It recounts the bishop's life as a young man and priest but stops abruptly during a description of Guðmundr's voyage to Norway for consecration in 1202. It may therefore be unfinished. However, it is preserved only through its integration into the later Guðmundar sögur and Sturlunga saga.

A series of four sagas about Bishop Guðmundr, known as Guðmundar sögur A, B, C, and D, were then written between 1314 and 1344, in what seems to have been a concerted attempt to canonise Guðmundr. Stefán Karlsson has connected the composition of Guðmundar sögur A, B, and possibly C, to the translation of Guðmundur's relics by Bishop Auðunn rauði Þorbergsson in 1314, while Guðmundar saga D was apparently composed by Arngrímr Brandsson for the second translation of Guðmundur's relics by Bishop Ormr Ásláksson in 1344.

- Guðmundar saga A (sometimes known as the 'oldest saga') is from the first half of the fourteenth century, most likely 1320–30. It combines the Prestssaga with other material from Hrafns saga Sveinbjarnarsonar, Íslendinga saga, Arons saga Hjörleifssonar, and annals, with little original writing by the compiler. The main manuscript of this version is AM 399 4to (c. 1330×50).
- Guðmundar saga B (sometimes known as the 'middle saga') probably dates from shortly after 1320. It combines material from Prestssaga, Hrafns saga Sveinbjarnarsonar, Íslendinga saga, and additional material, with authorial commentary, and aims to write Bishop Guðmundr as a saint. The main manuscript is AM 657c 4to (c. 1350).
- Guðmundar saga C (which has yet to be edited) was based either on B or the same sources, around 1320–45. Unlike the earlier versions, written in the spartan, classical saga-style, version C was consistently rewritten in the 'florid style' associated with the North Icelandic Benedictine School of saga-writing. It may have been made by Bergr Sokkason. The rearrangements of the source material seem to have been intended to produce the life of a confessor, with a vita followed by a list of post mortem miracles. C survives only in incomplete, seventeenth-century manuscripts.
- Guðmundar saga D, based on the C-text, was by a monk called Arngrímr, generally thought to be Arngrímr Brandsson, and can be seen as belonging in style to the North Icelandic Benedictine School of saga-writing. It was composed after 1343; the oldest manuscript is Stockholm Perg. fol. no. 5 (c. 1350–60); and two different versions seem to have been in circulation early in the version's history. Version D both omits and adds material in its efforts to strengthen Guðmundr's saintly image. This version included praise-poetry of Guðmundr by the author and by another poet, thought to be Einarr Gilsson. The various explanations of Icelandic customs in the saga suggest that it was intended for a foreign audience, and it has been suggested that D is a translation from Latin. No such Latin text is known, however.

== Sources ==
- Stefán Karlsson, 'Guðmundar saga biskups', in Medieval Scandinavia: An Encyclopedia, ed. by Phillip Pulsiano (New York: Garland, 1993), pp. 245–46.
- Sigurdson, Erika Ruth, 'The Church in Fourteenth-Century Iceland: Ecclesiastical Administration, Literacy, and the Formation of an Elite Clerical Identity' (unpublished Ph.D. thesis, University of Leeds, 2011), pp. 57–58, http://etheses.whiterose.ac.uk/2610/
- Margaret Cormack, 'Christian Biography', in A Companion to Old Norse-Icelandic Literature and Culture, ed. by Rory McTurk (Oxford: Blackwell, 2005), pp. 27–42 (pp. 38–39).
- G. Turville-Petre and E. S. Olszewska (trans.), The Life of Gudmund the Good, Bishop of Holar ([London]: The Viking Society for Northern Research, 1942), http://vsnrweb-publications.org.uk/The%20Life%20of%20Gudmund%20the%20Good.pdf (mainly a translation of Guðmundar saga A).

== See also ==
Selkolla
