= Þorbergsson =

Þorbergsson is an Icelandic surname. Notable people with the name include:

- Auðunn rauði Þorbergsson (1250–1322), Icelandic bishop
- Freysteinn Þorbergsson (1931–1974), Icelandic chess player
