= Sverris saga =

Norwegian saga

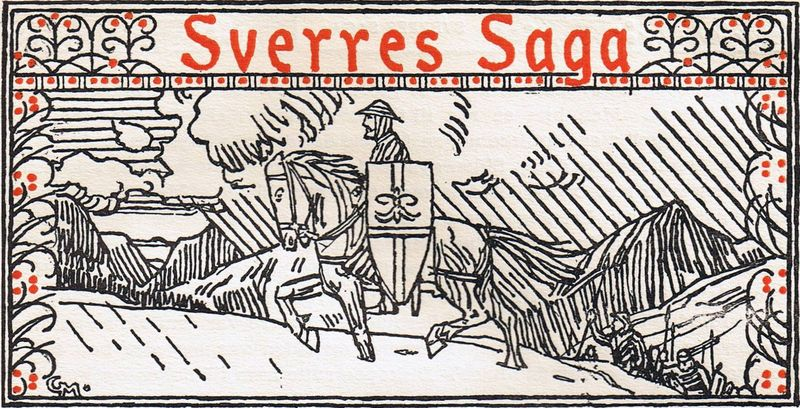
Title page to Sverre's saga, illus. Gerhard Munthe

Sverris saga is one of the Kings' sagas. Its subject is King Sverre Sigurdsson of Norway (r. 1177–1202) and it is the main source for this period of Norwegian history. As the foreword tells us, the saga in its final form consists of more than one part. Work first began in 1185 under the king’s direct supervision. It is not known when it was finished, but presumably it was well known when Snorri Sturluson began writing his Heimskringla in the 1220s since Snorri ends his account where Sverris saga begins. Thus the saga is contemporary or near-contemporary with the events it describes. The saga is obviously written by someone sympathetic to Sverre’s cause, but the strict demands of the genre ensure some degree of impartiality.

== Authorship and composition ==
The first distinct part of the saga is called Grýla and describes the events until the aftermath of Sverre's first major victory at the Battle of Kalvskinnet (slaget på Kalvskinnet) outside Nidaros in 1179. Central to this part is Sverre Sigurdsson's claim to be the son of King Sigurd Munn and his struggle against his rival claimant Magnus Erlingsson. Sverre's supporters were called the Birkebeiners while his opponents were known as the Baglers. According to the foreword, Grýla was written by Karl Jónsson, the Abbot from Þingeyrar monastery in the north of Iceland. Karl Jónsson is known to have visited Norway from 1185 to c. 1188. Sverre is supposed to have served as Grýla’s main source and decided what should be written. The Saga ends at Sverre's death in 1202 and was completed afterwards, perhaps by Karl Jónsson as well.

The saga recorded a battle at Sverresborg castle in 1197. The Baglers launched a surprise attack and entered the castle through a secret door. While the castle's inhabitants ate dinner, the Baglers burned everything inside the castle and threw a dead man into the only well that was used for drinking water. In 1938, a skeleton was discovered in the filled in well at the site, it was later retrieved in 2016. In 2024 the skeleton was identified as a man who had been injured and died shortly before being placed in the well in the same timeframe as described in the saga. Genetic evidence indicated that the man was 30 to 40 years old when he died and that he came from an area that was controlled by the Baglers, which suggested that the Baglers threw one of their dead soldiers into the well. According to Sverris saga, the Baglers wanted to make the castle uninhabitable for Sverre and the Birkebeiners.

== Style ==
Grýla is written in a unique style that to some degree seems to be inspired by the long medieval tradition of hagiography. The style and focus of Sverris saga is very unlike that of the earlier Norwegian synoptics. Instead of narrowly focusing on the king and major events of state, Sverris saga is a detailed and rich biography with a large cast of characters, elaborate scenes and dialogue. The saga is the most detailed in the depiction of the many battles Sverre led to win and retain the monarchy in the country, The saga is particularly detailed when it comes to Sverre's speeches, as well as his battles and military strategy.

== Editions ==
- Sverris saga, ed. by Þorleifur Hauksson, Íslenzk fornrit, 30 (Reykjavík: Hið íslenzka fornritafélag, 2007)

== Other sources ==
- Jakobsson, Ármann (2005) Royal Biography, in A Companion to Old Norse-Icelandic Literature and Culture (Rory McTurk, ed. Wiley-Blackwell) ISBN 0-631-23502-7
