= Auðunarstofa =

Historic building in Skagafjörður, Iceland

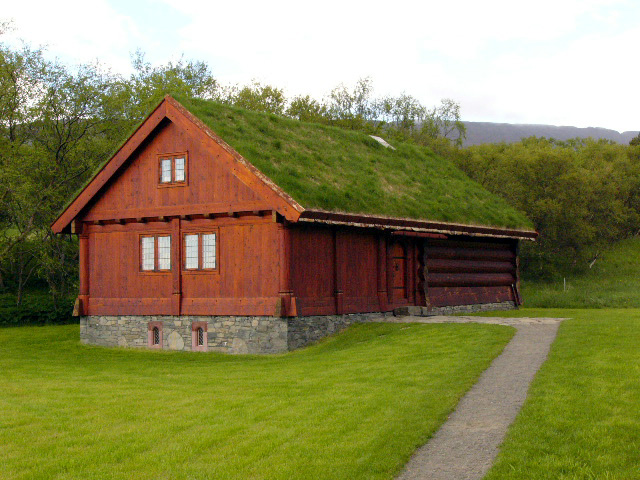
- Auðunarstofa
- Interactive map of the Auðunarstofa area
- Alternative names: Timburstofan

General information
- Type: Wooden cabin using stave construction techniques
- Location: Hólar, Iceland
- Coordinates: 65.73422°N 19.11448°W
- Year built: 1316–1317
- Renovated: Rebuilt in 2002
- Demolished: 1810

Auðunarstofa or Timburstofan (Auðunn’s Room or the Wooden Room) was built in Hólar in Skagafjörður, Iceland from 1316 to 1317 and stood for 500 years or until it was torn down in 1810. Auðunn rauði ("the red") Þorbergsson, Bishop of Hólar, brought the wood with him when he came to Iceland in 1315. The wood was transported in the winter from Seleyri in Borgarfjörður over Stórisandur to Hólar where the wooden structure was built.

Timburstofan was part of a staðarhús in Hólar, located directly south of the cemetery. It consisted of two parts: the log cabin, that is, the actual wooden house; and a stave building that was connected to the main building. The stave building had two stories, the bottom floor was sometimes called Anddyr or Forstofa (the entrance or the anteroom), and the upper Studium or Studiumloft. It is possible that it had a balcony passage in earlier times alongside Timburstofan. The name Auðunarstofa originally came from the annal of Jón Espólín, which mentions the demolition of the building in 1810.

In 1995, the suffragan bishop Bolli Gústavsson formulated the idea of rebuilding Auðunarstofa in Hólar. With the cooperation of Icelandic and Norwegian organizations, and Auðunarstofa was completely finished in summer 2002. The building was a farily accurate reconstruction of the old cabin, with the exception of the stave construction being a little bigger to make the building more useful.
