= Jóns þáttr biskups Halldórssonar =

Short Old Norse-Icelandic narrative of the life of Jón Halldórsson

Jóns þáttr biskups Halldórssonar (The Tale of Bishop Jón Halldórsson) is a short Old Norse-Icelandic narrative of the life of Jón Halldórsson, Norwegian bishop of Skálholt from 1322 to 1339. It was likely authored by Bergr Sokkason and is written in the 'florid style' characteristic of the North Icelandic Benedictine School. The text is extant in two manuscripts from the 14th and 15th centuries.

The þáttur is unique among other bishops' sagas for two reasons. Firstly, it is the only such text to focus on a Norwegian bishop. Secondly, the narrative structure is based around a series of exempla, and appears to have been influenced by the Dominican style of preaching. For this reason, Sigurdson has argued against Guðrún Ása Grímsdóttir's suggestion that Jóns þáttr may have been written as a plan for a fully-fledged bishop's saga.

The þáttur does not include details of Jón's ecclesiastical or political activities which are recorded in Lárentíus saga and other sources. Sigurdson writes "Jón Halldórsson was an innovative and influential bishop, a legal expert, and a bureaucrat; the omission of any of this from his þáttur serves to further prove how far removed this piece of literature is from any of the bishops' sagas."

== Bibliography ==
=== Manuscripts ===
- AM 657 4to (14th century)
- AM 624 4to (15th century)

=== Editions ===
- Sigurðsson, Jón; Vigfússon, Guðbrandur (1858–1878). Biskupa sögur. Vol. 2. Copenhagen: Møller. pp. 221-230.
- Gering, Hugo (1882–1884). Islendzk æventyri: Isländische Legenden Novellen und Märchen. Vol. 1. Halle: Waisenhauss. pp. 84-94.
- Jónsson, Guðni (1948). Byskupa sögur. Reykjavík: Íslendingasagnaútgáfan, Haukadalsútgáfan.
- Grímsdóttir, Guðrún Ása (1998). "Söguþáttur Jóns Halldórssonar biskups". Byskupa sögur III. Íslenzk fornrit XVII. Hið Íslenzka fornritafélag. ISBN 9979-893-17-6.
