= Selkolla =

Icelandic mythological creature

Selkolla (literally 'seal-head') is a supernatural being in Icelandic folklore. She is described as a fair woman that is sometimes seen having the head of a seal. She is most prominently attested as an antagonist of Bishop Guðmundur Arason (1161–1237). Tales of Selkolla are noted for combining Christian ideas with concepts found in Scandinavian non-Christian traditions.

== Medieval Sources ==
The main medieval source for stories about Selkolla is different versions of Guðmundar saga Arasonar, specifically versions B and D, where the episode is often now referred to as Selkollu þáttr ('the Selkolla episode').

=== Guðmundar saga version D ===
This summary is based on the D-version of Guðmundar saga.

The events of Selkollu þáttr take place in the Westfjords, beginning when a man and woman are taking a baby girl to be baptised. On the way, they indulge in an "immoral rest" beside a large stone, fittingly called Miklisteinn ('large stone') and "turn onto the alternative road of fornication". Once they have finished having sex, they return to the child, who they had set down, and find that it is now "black, dead, and hideous". The couple decide to leave the child behind and walk away, but as they do so they hear a cry. They return to the child and find that it is alive, but it is now so "terrifying that they dare neither touch it nor come near". They go to the farm to fetch more people, but when they return to the stone, the child has vanished.

It is then said that a certain woman is "newly arrived in the district, sometimes with an ordinary face but sometimes with a seal's head. This devil walked about as boldly by day as by night, for which reason this midday-devil was called Selkolla in the district".

What follows is an account of the assaults of this being at a farm which is never localised in any more detail. First, in the guise of the farmer's wife, she tries to entice him into having sex. When he realises what is actually going on, he tries to turn for home, but Selkolla bars his way, such that he gets home to the farm "tired and exhausted", and lies in bed "on account of that sickness, which the deceitful trick of the Devil had afflicted upon his virility. He could not have any thereafter, because the same unclean spirit seeks him day and night with enthusiasm". No-one wants to be near the farmer to provide him with any solace, "except for one diligent kinsman of his, who lies beside him until Selkolla overcomes him in the night and bursts out his eyes".

Guðmundr, who is wandering the Westfjords, is called in and asked to tackle the fiend. He decides to stay at the farm which Selkolla is afflicting, and once he has gone to bed for the night he sees that a woman "takes him by surprise" and tries to pull off his shoes, which his servants have forgotten to do. Guðmundur realises immediately who it is and drives Selkolla away with the words "far niðr, fjandi, ok gakk ei framarr!" ("go down, devil, and don't come back!"). The next day, Guðmundr and Selkolla meet again and he drives her down once more, this time by setting up seven crosses.

So ends Guðmundr's dealings with Selkolla. She rears her head once more on board a ship which is on the way "over the flord, or bay" which separates the country's dioceses. But the crew have received the blessing of Guðmundr for the journey, and the blessing prevents Selkolla from harming them.

The episode ends with a 21-stanza account in skaldic verse by Einarr Gilsson, known as Selkolluvísur.

=== Guðmundar saga, version B ===
The story also appears in the B-version of Guðmundar saga, where the main difference is that some of the characters are named, and the text claims that Selkolla gave her name to the cliff Selkollu-Kleifar.

=== Íslendinga saga ===
Selkolla is briefly mentioned in Íslendinga saga:

Biskup ferr um sumarit yfir Vest-fjörðu; en um vetrinn var hann á Breiðabólstað í Steingrímsfirði með Bergþóri Jónssyni. Ok urðu þar margir hlutir, þeir er frásagnar væri verðir, ok jarteignum þótti gegna, þó þat sé eigi ritað í þessa bók; bæði þat er biskup átti við flagð þat, er þeir kölluðu Sel-kollu, ok mart annat.

The Bishop travels for the summer across the Westfjords; but during the winter he was in Breiðabólsstaður in Steingrímsfjörður with Bergþór Jónsson. And there many things happened which would be worth recounting, were thought to count as miracles, although they are not written in this book: both that the Bishop dealt with the ogress whom they called Selkolla, and much besides.

== Modern folklore ==
Stories of Selkolla quite different from the medieval ones continued to circulate in the nineteenth century. By the twentieth century, however, stories told about Selkolla were being influenced by the medieval narrative, which had come into print and was becoming better known in Iceland.

Supposedly, the stone where the child who became Selkolla was laid is to be found not too far from Hólmavík, and features in tourism marketing in the area.

== Analyses ==
The medieval story of Selkolla has been shown to share motifs with post-medieval Scandinavian folklore about changelings and ghosts or other hauntings by dead children, the skogsrå, and folklore about seals. Contrary to the claims in the B-version of Guðmundar saga, it is unlikely that she gave her name to the cliff Selkollukleifar ('Seal-head-cliffs'): rather the cliff was probably named after seals that were visible from it, and the story of Selkolla then invented to explain the name.
