= Arons saga Hjörleifssonar =

Norse contemporary saga

Arons saga Hjörleifssonar (standardised Old Norse spelling: Arons saga Hjǫrleifssonar) is a saga recounting the life of Aron Hjörleifsson (c. 1200–55), an important contemporary of Sturla Sighvatsson and Bishop Guðmundr Arason. It has been dated to around 1340, though it survives first in a fifteenth-century vellum fragment (AM 551d beta 4to), with the earliest complete texts being the paper manuscripts AM 212 fol., AM 426 fol., and AM 399 4to (known as the Codex Resenianus).

The saga portrays Aron as a supporter of Bishop Guðmundr, and as in turn receiving the benefits of Guðmundr's numinous assistance. It seems to have been written in the wake of the attempts to have Guðmundr canonised around 1320. It claims that Aron was one of the most famous warriors of his time, becoming an outlaw at the hands of Sturla Sighvatsson, travelling as a pilgrim to Jerusalem, and ending his life at the court of Haakon IV of Norway.

Arons saga is not part of the compilation of sagas about Aron's time known as Sturlunga saga, but stands alongside Sturlunga saga as an important depiction of events at that time. While not a straightforwardly reliable source for the time it describes, it does provide interesting evidence for the interactions of written sources, memory, and Icelandic identity under Norwegian rule in the fourteenth century.

== Editions and translations ==
- Arons saga Hjörleifssonar, in Sturlunga saga, ed. by Jón Jóhannesson, Magnús Finnbogason, Kristján Eldjárn, and Magnús Jónsson, 2 vols (Reykjavík: Sturlunguútgáfan, 1946), II 237–78.
- Arons saga in Sturlunga saga, ed. by Guðni Jónsson, 3 vols (Reykjavík: Íslendingasagnaútgáfan/Haukadalsútgáfan, 1948), http://heimskringla.no/wiki/Arons_saga
- The Saga of Aron Hjörleifsson, trans. by John Porter (London: Pirate Press, 1975), http://www.medievalists.net/2009/01/the-saga-of-aron-hjorleifsson/
