= Einarr Gilsson =

Icelandic poet and official

Einarr Gilsson was an Icelandic poet and official. He was the lögmaður of northern and western Iceland from 1367 to 1369. He is mentioned already in letters dating from 1339 and 1340 but his years of birth and death are unknown. He appears to have lived in Skagafjörður.

Einarr was the author of Ólafs ríma Haraldssonar, a ríma on Saint Óláfr Haraldsson consisting of 65 ferskeytt verses. Preserved in Flateyjarbók, it is sometimes considered the earliest known ríma. Einarr's other preserved works are poems on Bishop Guðmundr Arason which have come down to us in Guðmundar saga biskups by Arngrímr Brandsson. These consist of a biographical dróttkvætt poem on the bishop focusing on his wonder-working, a shorter hrynhent poem on Guðmundr's conversations with archbishop Þórir of Niðarós and a flokkr on Guðmundr's struggle with the supernatural being Selkolla.

Finnur Jónsson characterized Einarr's poetry as "dry narratives without any poetic flight" and that as a poet Einarr is to be rated "on the whole, not highly".
