= Leiðarvísir og borgarskipan =

12th-century guidebook for pilgrims

Leiðarvísir og borgarskipan (Note: Old Norse pronunciation: [ˈlɛiðarˌwiːsɪr ɔk ˈbɔrɣar̥scɪpan], Icelandic pronunciation: [ˈleiːðarˌviˑsɪr ɔɣ ˈpɔrkarˌscɪˑpan].) ("A Guide and List of Cities") is an itinerary written c. 1157 by Nikulás Bergsson (a.k.a. Nikolaos), the abbot of the monastery of Þverá in Eyjafjörður, Northern Iceland.

It is a guidebook for pilgrims about the routes from Northern Europe to Rome and Jerusalem. It contains two descriptions of lands around Norway that the Abbot seems to have acquired for his book from independent sources.

== Manuscript ==
The Leiðarvísir is found in a manuscript known as AM 194 8vo, copied in 1387 by two scribes. The greater part by far was copied by Óláfr Ormsson, a priest from Snæfellsnes, while only a few pages are the work of Brynjólfr Steinráðarson. Although AM 194 8vo contains an eclectic mix of texts, it was compiled with a view towards making a coherent whole.

== Itinerary ==
The following is a list of the towns in the different itineraries described in Leiðarvísir:

=== Denmark ===
- Aalborg
- Viborg
- Hedeby

=== Germany ===
- Itzehoe
- Stade

First variation

- Verden
- Nienburg
- Minden
- Paderborn
- Niedermarsberg, former Horhausen ('Horus'), near Marsberg
- 'Kiliandr', probably Caldern in Lahntal

Second variation

- Harsefeld
- Walsrode
- Hanover
- Hildesheim
- Bad Gandersheim
- Fritzlar
- Arnsburg near Lich

Third variation

- Utrecht (Netherlands)
- Cologne
- Mainz
- Worms
- Speyer

=== France ===
- Seltz
- Strasbourg

=== Switzerland ===
- Basel
- Solothurn
- Avenches
- Vevey
- Saint-Maurice
- Bourg-Saint-Pierre

=== Italy ===
- Great St Bernard Pass
- Etroubles
- Aosta
- Pont-Saint-Martin
- Ivrea
- Vercelli
- Pavia
- Piacenza
- Fidenza
- Borgo Val di Taro
- Crucis markaðr (?)
- Frackaskáli (?)
- Pontremoli
- Mariogilldi (?)
- Santo Stefano di Magra
- Marioborg (?)
- Luni
- Kjóformunt (?)
- Lucca
- Altopascio
- Ponte a Cappiano
- Sanctinusborg (Borgo San Genesio)
- Martinusborg (Borgo Marturi, current Poggibonsi)
- Semunt (Monte Maggio, south of Monteriggioni)
- Siena
- San Quirico d'Orcia
- Acquapendente
- Bolsena
- Montefiascone
- Viterbo
- Sútarinn micli (?) ("large Sutri")
- Sútarinn litli (?) ("small Sutri")
- Monte Mario
- Rome
- First variation
  - Tusculum
  - Ferentino
  - Ceprano
  - Aquino
  - Monte Cassino
- Second variation
  - Albano
  - Terracina
  - Fondi
  - Gaeta
- Capua
- Benevento
- Siponto
- Barletta
- Trani
- Bisceglie
- Molfetta
- Giovinazzo
- Bari
- Monopoli
- Brindisi

=== Greece ===
- Peloponnese (Note: Bolgaraland, land of the Bulgars (i.e., Slavs), in the Leiðarvísir. Willibald, a northern European pilgrim of the 9th century, likewise called the Peloponnese Slavinia on account of its Slavic inhabitants.)
- Kos
- Constantinople
- Rhodes
- Kastellorizon
- Patara
- Cyprus
- Paphos

=== Holy Land ===
- Acre
- Capharnaum
- Caesarea Palaestina
- Jaffa
- Ascalon
- Serkland
- Tyre
- Sidon
- Tripoli
- Latakia
- Antioch
- Syrland (Note: According to Níkulás, this was the Saracens called the Kingdom of Jerusalem.)
- Galilee
- Mount Tabor
- Nazareth
- Jenin
- Iohannis-kastali (Note: "John's castle", modern Sebastia, was correctly identified by Níkulás with ancient Samaria.)
- Jacob's Well
- Nablus
- an unidentified casalis
- Bira
- Jerusalem
- Bethlehem
- Bethany
- Sodom and Gomorra
- River Jordan
- Mount of Olives
- Kidron Valley
- Monastery of the Temptation
- Abraham's Castle
- Jericho
- Abrahams-veller (Note: The "plains of Abraham" were the fertile heights around Jericho. The designation is of crusader origin.)
- Rabitaland (Note: The land beyond the Jordan, i.e. Arabia.)
