= Contemporary sagas =

The contemporary sagas (known in Icelandic as samtíðarsögur) are:

- Bishops' saga
- Sturlunga saga
