= Nitida saga =

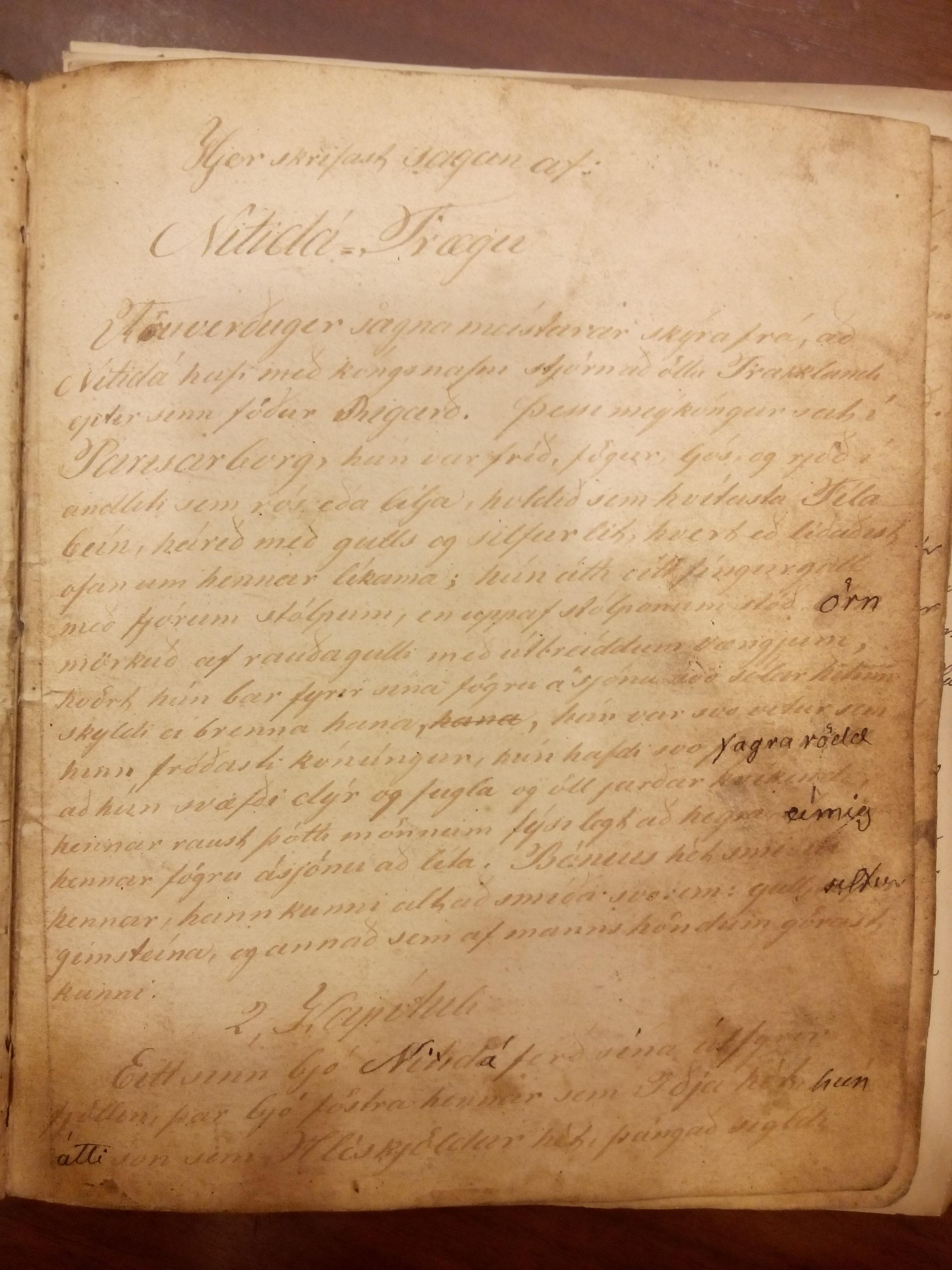
Baltimore, Johns Hopkins University Library, Nikulás Ottenson Collection, MS 17, beginning of Nítíða saga. Copied in 1853 by Sigmundur Sigfússon, Ekkjufell, Norður-Múlasýsla.

Nitida saga (medieval manuscript spelling) or Nítíða saga (normalised Old Norse and modern Icelandic spelling), also known as Nítíða saga frægu ('the saga of Nítíða the renowned') is a fictional late medieval Icelandic romance saga thought to have been composed in Iceland in the fourteenth century. This saga is about a maiden-king named Nitida, who rules over France, and who is pursued by kings and princes from such faraway places as Constantinople, India, and a place the saga calls the Land of the Saracens. It is thought to be a direct response to Klári saga: in Klári saga, the main female protagonist, Serena, is brutally punished for her initial refusal to marry the hero Klárus, whereas the heroine of Nitida saga is portrayed much more favourably. Ethnicity, travel, and geography play important roles in the saga, and questions of gender and power, while magic, trickery, and deception are also prominent.

== Summary ==
In the words of Sheryl McDonald Werronen,

The romance begins by describing the maiden-king Nítíða, ruler of France. She travels from Paris to Apulia to visit her foster mother Egidia, and then to the strange island of Visio, from which she obtains magical stones. On her return to France, Nítíða brings her foster-brother Hléskjöldur with her, to help defend the kingdom. Nítíða now refuses a string of suitors. First is Ingi of Constantinople, who returns twice after being refused: to abduct first Nítíða (she escapes through magic) and then, mistakenly, a disguised maidservant. The next suitors are sons of Soldán of Serkland. Foreseeing their arrival, Nítíða fortifies her castle and has her foster-brother Hléskjöldur defeat them and their armies before they ever see her. Livorius of India tries next. Aware of Nítíða’s reputation for outwitting previous suitors, he wastes no time in bringing her straight to India. She escapes by magic and takes Livorius’s sister Sýjalín with her back to France in retaliation. Now Soldán of Serkland is set on avenging his sons’ deaths. Foreseeing his plan, Nítíða sends Hléskjöldur to fight them at sea. Livorius arrives at the battle unexpectedly. He defeats Soldán, then heals the wounded Hléskjöldur in India before sending him back to France. Livorius then meets his aunt Alduria, who suggests he return to France in disguise and stay the winter in Nítíða’s household, to become better acquainted. Taking this advice, he gains Nítíða’s confidence, disguised as a prince named Eskilvarður. One day, Nítíða asks him to look into her magical stones, where they see throughout the world, which is depicted in three parts. Nítíða then reveals that she had seen through Livorius’s disguise as soon as he arrived. He proposes to Nítíða, she accepts, and their wedding is set for autumn. Ingi hears the news, and, still angry and humiliated, gathers an army against France. Livorius and Ingi fight, Livorius spares Ingi’s life, and has his sister Sýjalín heal Ingi. Sýjalín and Ingi fall in love, and Nítíða’s foster brother Hléskjöldur is matched with Ingi’s sister Listalín. The saga ends with a triple wedding, and Nítíða and Livorius’s son succeeds them as ruler of France.

== Manuscripts and editions ==
- ‘Nitida saga’, ed. by Agnete Loth, in Late Medieval Icelandic Romances, 5 vols (Copenhagen: Munksgaard, 1962–65), V (1965), pp. 1–37 (diplomatic edition and basic English summary).
- Sheryl McDonald Werronen, Popular Romance in Iceland: The Women, Worldviews, and Manuscript Witnesses of Nítíða saga (Amsterdam: Amsterdam University Press, 2016), pp. 221-34 (Icelandic text, normalised to modern Icelandic spelling), pp. 235-48 (English translation) (revised from Sheryl McDonald, 'Nítíða saga: A Normalised Icelandic Text and Translation', Leeds Studies in English, 40 (2009), 119-45) (normalized Icelandic edition and full English translation).

The saga survives in 65 known manuscripts, though it is possible that others remain to be identified, particularly in North America.
