= Þingeyraklaustur =

Benedictine monastery in Iceland active in the middle ages

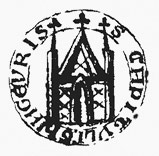
Signet of Þingeyraklaustur, 15th century

Þingeyraklaustur was a monastery of the Order of Saint Benedict located in Þingeyrar on Iceland from 1133 until 1551. It was the first monastery in Iceland and probably the last to be closed by the Icelandic Reformation.

== History ==
The monastery was founded by bishop Jón Ögmundsson in 1106, but it was not inaugurated until 1133 when its first abbot, Vilmundur Þórólfsson, was officially installed in office. Jón Ögmundsson assured the monastery an income from all farms between Hrútafjörður and Vatnsdalsá.

In the 12th century, the First Grammatical Treatise was possibly written at the monastery.

Þingeyraklaustur was one of the largest and richest monasteries in Iceland and a famous center of literature, culture and education, famed for its library. Arngrímr Brandsson, Karl Jónsson, Gunnlaugr Leifsson and Oddr Snorrason were all religious brothers at Þingeyraklaustur and active as writers, and the writer Styrmer Kåresson is believed to have been educated there as well. A large number of Sagas of Icelanders were either produced or copied at the monastery, and the famous Bandamanna saga, Grettis saga, Hallfreðar saga, Heiðarvíga saga, Kormáks saga, and Vatnsdæla saga are all likely to have been produced there.

In 1402 the monastery was dissolved after bubonic plague claimed the lives of all but one brother. It was reestablished in 1424 by Ásbjörn Vigfússon, who served as abbot.

The monastery may have survived longer than other monastic institutes in Iceland. It was officially closed in 1551 during the Icelandic Reformation when the last abbot, Helgi Höskuldsson, was formally declared deposed, the monastery was banned from accepting novices, and its assets declared confiscated. The former monks were however allowed to remain for life if they wished, and it is therefore not known when it actually dissolved.
