= Lárentíus Kálfsson =

Roman Catholic bishop

- Born: 10 August 1267
- Died: 16 April 1331 (aged 63)
- Occupation: bishop
- Years active: 1324–1331

Lárentíus Kálfsson (medieval Icelandic Laurentius Kálfsson; 10 August 1267 – 16 April 1331) was bishop of the northern Icelandic diocese of Hólar 1324–31.

Laurentius studied first with Þórarinn kaggi, his maternal uncle, in Vellir in Svarfaðardalur and later with Jörundr Þorsteinsson, the bishop of Hólar, and became renowned for his learning. He spent much of his career, however, in dispute with various powerful churchmen. He was consecrated as a priest in 1288 and was the schoolmaster at Hólar for the following three years, after which he was a priest at Háls in Fnjóskadalur from 1292 to 1293. Following a dispute with the bishop of Hólar, he went to Norway in 1294 and there served Archbishop Jörundr, studying law with Jón the Fleming, and finding himself making enemies among the canons of the cathedral of Nidaros. Returning to Norway after an unsuccessful trip to Iceland in 1307-8, he was imprisoned by them, and sent back to Iceland in 1309 where he was able to join the monastery of Þykkvabær. The next bishop of Hólar was an old enemy of Laurentius's from among the canons of Nidaros, Auðunn rauði Þorbergsson, with whom Laurentius made peace in the autumn of 1319, going on to teach Auðunn's grandson. On Auðunn's death in 1322, Laurentius succeeded him as bishop of Hólar, being consecrated in 1324. On his death in 1331, Laurentius was succeeded by Egill Eyjólfsson.

Most of what we know about Laurentius comes from the Laurentius saga, almost certainly written by Laurentius's one-time pupil and close friend Einarr Hafliðason (1307–93).

Laurentius had a son by a Norwegian woman: Árni Lárentíusson, later a monk at Þingeyraklaustur.

== Sources ==
- Páll Eggert Ólason: Íslenskar æviskrár III.
- Sigurjón Páll Ísaksson: Auðun biskup rauði og timburstofan á Hólum. Um Auðunarstofu, Hólanefnd 2004. Ritstj: Þorsteinn Gunnarsson.
- Elton, Oliver (trans.), The Life of Laurence Bishop of Hólar in Iceland (London: Rivington, 1890), available at https://archive.org/details/lifeoflaurencebi00einauoft.
- Árni Björnsson (ed.), Laurentius saga biskups, Rit handritastofunar Íslands, 3 (Reykjavík: Handritastofnun Íslands, 1969).
- Guðrún Ása Grímsdóttir (ed.), Biskupa sögur III: Árna saga biskups, Lárentius saga biskups, Söguþáttr Jóns Halldórssonar biskups, Biskupa ættir, Íslenzk fornrit, 17 (Reykjavík: Hið Íslenzka fornritfélag, 1998).
- Sigurdson, Erika Ruth, 'The Church in Fourteenth-Century Iceland: Ecclesiastical Administration, Literacy, and the Formation of an Elite Clerical Identity' (unpublished Ph.D. thesis, University of Leeds, 2011), http://etheses.whiterose.ac.uk/2610/
