= Lögmannsannáll =

Icelandic annals

Lögmannsannáll (from Old Norse: Governors' Annals) is among the most well-known of the medieval Icelandic annals and is preserved in the Árni Magnússon Institute for Icelandic Studies in Reykjavík as manuscript AM 420 B, (c. 1362–1390). Lögmannsannáll was primarily written by Einarr Hafliðason. Its content starts with the martyrdom of Saint Peter and Paul the Apostle, and continues until the last entry, dated 1361, which appears to depart from the original author's handwriting, with another writer updating the annals through 1380, possibly from Hólar. In the next four years, from 1381 to 1384, a third writer appeared and through his style it can be deduced that the manuscript was transferred to the north, to Skálholt. The entries end in 1430.

== Nýi Annáll ==
Nýi Annáll, which literally means New Annals, is the last fragment of Lögmannsannáll, which corresponds to the entries from 1393 to 1430. This is considered the last of the Icelandic annals and the only one written in the 15th century. Nýi Annáll does not appear in manuscript AM 420 B, but in a copy of the 17th century AM 240 C.

== Bibliography ==
Eldbjørg Haug, The Icelandic Annals as Historical Sources, 1997
