= Auðunn rauði Þorbergsson =

Icelandic bishop in Hólar (1250–1322)

Auðunn rauði Þorbergsson (c. 1250 – 28 January 1322) was bishop of Iceland's northern diocese of Hólar 1313–22.

Auðunn was a Norwegian and was for a while a priest of Trondenes Church in Hålogaland (not far from the present-day town of Harstad in northern Norway). He later became a canon of Nidaros Cathedral, and became one of the foremost of their number, for example in their disputes with Archbishop Jǫrundr of Nidaros. Auðunn was well travelled and more than once visited the Pope in Rome. He won the esteem of the Norwegian king and was for a long time a retainer of Haakon V of Norway.

Auðunn was consecrated Bishop of Hólar on 25 November 1313. He arrived in Iceland in the summer of 1315 (at Seleyri í Borgarfirði) and rode north to Hólar. As bishop he exerted control firmly, both regarding finances and discipline among the clergy. He soon got into disputes with the major clerics of his diocese, events which are recounted particularly by Laurentius saga. Major achievements during his episcopate were his translation of the relics of Bishop Guðmundur Arason, helping to establish his feast within the northern Church. In 1318 he had the máldagar (property records) of his diocese collected in a book, providing a major historical record of the diocese's (then) ninety-eight churches. He brought with him a timber building from Norway which was erected at Hólar in 1316–17, later called Auðunarstofa, which stood until 1810 and was reconstructed in 2002 under the guidance of the then suffragan bishop of Hólar, Bolli Gústavsson.

In the summer of 1320, Auðunn sailed to Norway, amongst other things to protect his interests in his dealing with the Icelanders, and died in Nidaros on 28 January 1322. He was buried at Church of St Mary in Trondheim. He was succeeded by Lárentíus Kálfsson. Auðunn had at least one daughter, Ölöf, whose son Eysteinn rauði became a prominent cleric under the tutelage of his grandfather and Laurentius.

== Sources ==
- Þorsteinn Gunnarsson et al., Um Auðunarstofu (Reykjavík: Hólanefnd, 2004), pp. 167–211.
