= Munkaþverá (monastery) =

Former monastery in Iceland

Coordinates: 65.54551°N 18.08268°W

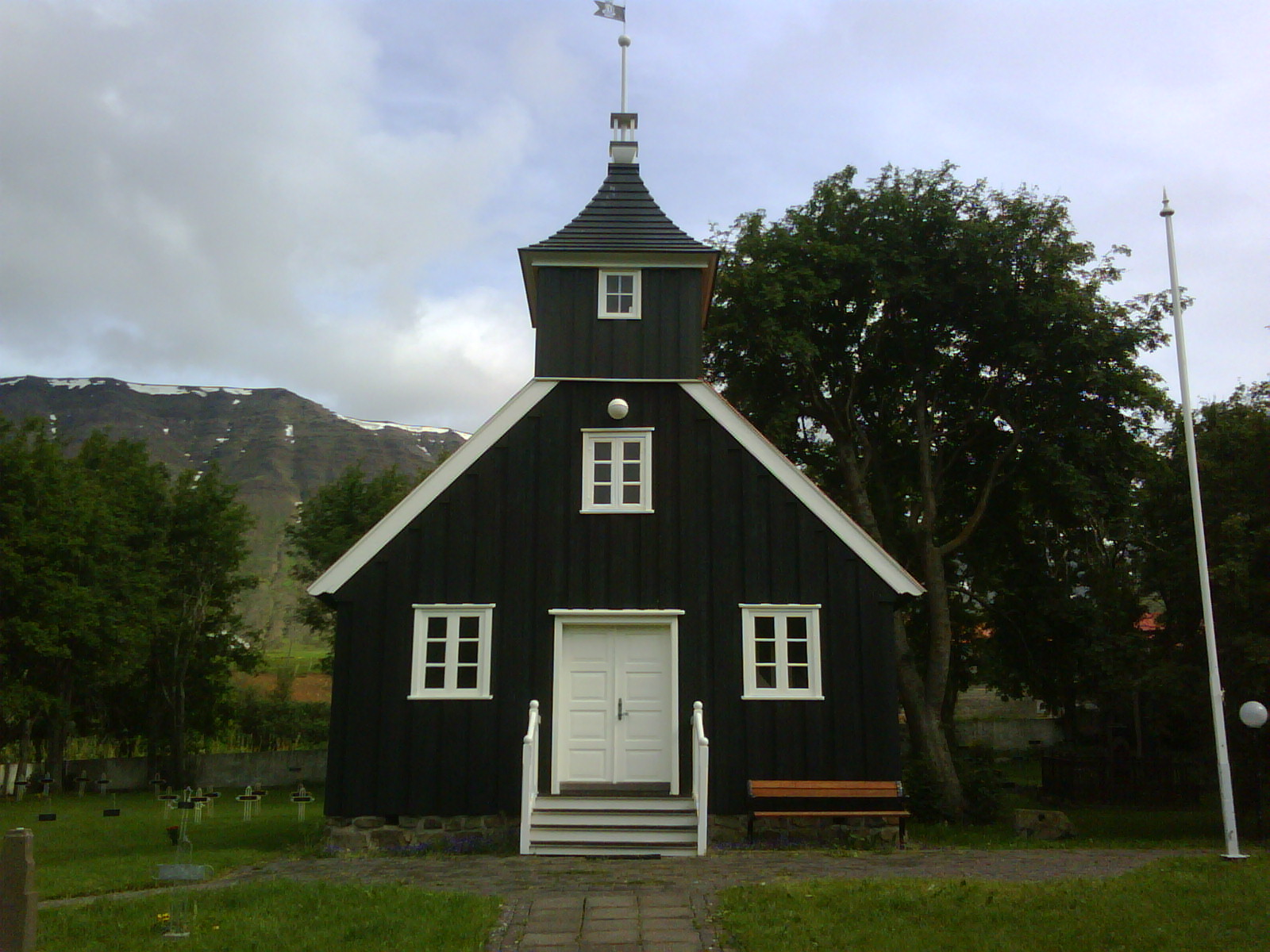
Munkaþverá church

Munkaþverá (Icelandic pronunciation: [ˈmuŋ̊kaˌθvɛːrˌauː]; also transliterated as Munkathvera) was a Benedictine monastery in Eyjafjörður, Iceland. It was established around 1155 and was abolished when the country became Protestant in 1550.

The monastery is best known about its early Abbot Níkulás Bergsson and his famous publication Leiðarvísir og borgarskipan, which was basically a guidebook for pilgrims about the routes from Northern Europe to Rome and Jerusalem. The monastery once was the home of such heroes of saga literature as Einar Þveræingur, Víga-Glúms and Bergur Sokkason. It is believed to be the burial place of Sighvatur Sturluson and his sons who died in the Battle of Örlygsstaðir.

The current church in Munkaþverá was built in 1844. In front of the church, there is a memorial dedicated to Jón Arason, who attended the monastery and did his studies there.
