= Rémundar saga keisarasonar =

Icelandic romance saga

Rémundar saga keisarasonar is a medieval Icelandic romance saga, and the longest of those romance-sagas composed in medieval Iceland.

== Synopsis ==
Kalinke and Mitchell summarise the saga thus:

Rémundr falls in love with a maiden whom he has seen only in his dreams. Carrying a statue of the maiden he sets off in search of her. Rémundr kills Eskupart who claimed to be the maiden's lover, but is himself wounded. Before he died Eskupart prophesied that Rémundr could be healed only by the most beautiful woman in the world. After many adventures, Rémundr is healed in India by Elina, the woman of his dreams.

A detailed summary has been produced by Margaret Schlauch. Among the saga's main inspirations are the Norwegian Tristrams saga ok Ísǫndar, and a story like the fourteenth-century romance Petit Artus de Bretagne.

== Manuscripts ==
Kalinke and Mitchell identified the following 41 manuscripts of the saga:

- AM 125, 8° (1652)
- AM 166, fol. (late 17th c.)
- AM 167, fol. (ca. 1660)
- AM 181h, fol. (ca. 1650)
- AM 538, 4° (1705)
- AM 539, 4° (17th c.)
- AM 540, 4° (late 17th c.)
- AM 567, 4°, II (14th c.), vellum
- AM 567, 4°, XIX/3 (16th c.), vellum, 4 lvs.
- AM 567, 4°, XIXy (late 14th c.), vellum
- AM 567, 4°, XlXa (late 15th c.), vellum
- AM 570b, 4° (late 15th c.), vellum
- AM 574, 4° (15th c.), vellum
- AM 579, 4° (15th c.), vellum
- BL Add. 4859, fol. (1693–97)
- IB 151, 4° (ca. 1810)
- IBR 43, 8° (19th c.)
- IBR 59, 4° (1798–1810)
- JS 166, fol. (1679)
- JS 27 fol. (ca. 1670)
- JS 408, 8° (1772, 19th c.)
- Lbs 1172, 4° (18th c.)
- Lbs 1497, 4° (1880–1905)
- Lbs 151, 4° (ca. 1780)
- Lbs 1680, 4° (1789)
- Lbs 1767, 4° (1857–63)
- Lbs 2146, 4° (1743)
- Lbs 2929, 4° (1880–89)
- Lbs 3122, 4° (19th c.)
- Lbs 319, 8° (1793)
- Lbs 3706, 8° (1874)
- Lbs 3947, 8° (1887)
- Lbs 4487, 4° (1879)
- Lbs 4492, 4° (1892)
- Lbs 840, 4° (1737)
- Nikulas Ottenson Collection, Johns Hopkins University, Baltimore, Md.: MS. Nr. 9 (1847–48)
- Papp. 4:o nr 16 (ca. 1650)
- Papp. fol. nr 47 (1690–91)
- Perg. fol. nr 7 (late 15th c.)
- BL Add. 11, 158, 4° (ca. 1764)
- NKS 1144, fol. (18th c.)

== Editions and translations ==
- Sven Grén Broberg (ed.), Rémundar saga keisarasonar, Samfund til udgivelse af gammel nordisk litteratur, 38 (Copenhagen: Møller, 1909–12) (based on AM 539, 4°; Stockholm Perg. fol. nr 7.)
- Riddarasögur, ed. by Bjarni Vilhjálmsson, 6 vols (Reykjavík: Íslendingasagnaútgáfan, 1949–1951), V, 161-339 (modernised spelling).
