= Klári saga =

Klári saga is one of the chivalric sagas of medieval Norway. Ostensibly derived from a Latin poem which Jón Halldórsson, Bishop of Skálholt, found in France, it became a prototype of the maiden king medieval Icelandic bridal-quest romances: it seems to have been the earliest of these, and was followed by many more. These include Nitida saga, which is thought to be a direct response to Klári saga.

== Content and themes ==
The protagonist of the story, Prince Klárus of Saxony, is told of the fair princess Serena of France by his mentor, Perus. Smitten by the description, Klárus asks leave to travel to France and ask the hand of Serena. Perus initially advises Klárus to rethink his proposal, as Serena is prone tricks and deceits. Klárus does not listen however, and travels to France with his troops. Klárus presents himself to the king of France, and is welcomed as a guest of honor. After sending her maid down to examine Klárus, Serena invites him and his troops to a feast in her tower, and he brings along sixty men. The feast is most marvelous, and Serena acts most lovingly towards her guests. However, as the evening passes she grows more and more tired of his manners and fixation on getting her hand in marriage. She offers him the blade of a jewel encrusted knife, but at the last moment as he is prone to accept it slices it downwards, so that it cuts his tunic and streaks his chest, and mocks him for the scums and barbarians he brought to her chamber.

Humiliated, Klárus returns to Saxony and threatens to execute Perus unless he helps him seek revenge on Serena. Perus reluctantly agrees, but insists that in order to do so he needs full control of the Saxon kingdom for three years. He is granted the power, and using the resources builds three grand tents, each more beautiful and decadent than the last. At the end of the third year Perus instructs Klárus that they shall return to France, but that he must go disguised and under the name of Eskelvarð, king of Ethiopia, with the aim to ask for Serena's hand.

Once Klárus and Perus along with the royal troops arrive in France, they pitch the three grand tents. Serena sends her maid to ask who arrives with such grandeur and display of wealth and riches, and if the grand tents would be able to be sold or gifted to her. The maid returns saying it is Eskelvarð of Ethiopia. Serena invites this king to a feast as before, and is adamant that she will have the grand tents. Eskelvarð says that the tents are not for sale, except if she is willing to buy them with her affection. She agrees, and later the night Eskelvarð arrives at her chambers. Serena offers Eskelvarð a drink, and drinks from the same pitcher beforehand. Once Eskelvarð takes his drink a deep sleep falls upon him: where Serena orders him to be dragged from the bed, flogged until bare, and left on the floor. Eskelvarð returns to his men ashamed and humiliated the next morning. Serena however still longs for the richness and grandeur of the tents, and asks Eskelvarð to a feast a few days later, which ends the same way with Eskelvarð whipped and humiliated.

At the third invitation Perus asks the maid not to offer Eskelvarð the sleep medication, and the maid tells them that the drinks that Serena drinks and Eskelvarð drinks are separated by a small compartment in the pitcher. Perus asks that the medication be thinned out so as not to awaken suspicion, but so that Eskelvarð does not sleep as long or deep. This comes to pass, and mid-night Eskelvarð wakes up on the floor, and joins Serena in her bed, sleeping with her. This leads to her submitting to him, and she agreeing to marry him and leaving France to join him.

Serena sleeps, and awakes in an unfamiliar, poor looking tent next to an unknown man, revealed to be Perus in disguise. Perus claims that she had sold her virginity to him, and that he is the true Eskelvarð, a poor vagabond. For the next 12 months the two of them travel in depravity, him making sure that they only ever have enough food to feed one himself, and the scraps going to her plate. Eventually they arrive at a big city, where Perus claims he cannot enter for the city has an open warrant for his capture. He sends her in to the city to beg for coin. For three days she attempts to do so with no success, but eventually comes across a temple, where she sees Klárus in his true person. Klárus takes notice of her, and pities her, giving her plenty to drink and eat. She brings this back to Perus, who insults her and takes all for himself, sending her back to beg. This repeats for three days, until Klárus invites her to his own chamber where he dresses her in fine clothing, gives her a feast to mend her sorrows. Serena is greeted by her maids, and Klárus tells her of the deception. She accepts his plea of apology, and they go back to Saxony where they lived happily ever after.

The epilogue goes on to explain the deception, that once they had wed in France Klárus had traveled back to Saxony, but Perus and Serena were left as vagabonds to test the conviction and strength of Serena. Having shown that she is willing to follow her husband even through poverty and hardship knowing her true rank, she is rewarded her character and became the queen of Saxony, ruler and loyal wife.

While a romance, the saga, at least in its early versions, also positions itself as an exemplum. In the words of Shaun F. D. Hughes, 'It is clear from the epilogue to Klári saga, that Bishop Jón is using the romance genre as an elaborate exemplum to promote his uncompromising views on the responsible behaviors of wives towards their husbands'. This aspect of the saga was, however, less influential on its successors than its bridal-quest plot. The saga is noted for its Latinate style (traditionally attributed to the putative Latin original but, according to Hughes and Kalinke, more likely simply a mark of learned Icelandic prose-style) and for heavy linguistic influence from Low German.

== Manuscripts ==
Kalinke and Mitchell list the following manuscripts of the saga:

- AM 179, fol. (17th c), defective
- AM 181e, fol. (ca. 1650)
- AM 395, fol. (18thc)
- AM 567, 4° IX (early 16th c), vellum, 3 leaves
- AM 589c, 4° (15th c), vellum, 1 leaf
- AM 589d, 4° (15th c), vellum
- AM 657a-b, 4° (late 14th c), vellum, defective
- Rask 31 (18th c.)
- The British Library Add. 4870,4° (18th c.)
- Lbs 222, fol. (1695-98)
- Lbs 1491, 4° (1880-1905)
- Lbs 1637, 4° (ca. 1780)
- Lbs 2319, 4° (1727-29)
- Lbs 3021,4° (1877)
- Lbs 4489, 4° (1885)
- Lbs 2315, 8° (ca. 1780-1819)
- Lbs 2484, 8° (ca. 1852)
- Lbs 2956, 8° (1858-64)
- JS 636, 4° (17th-19th c)
- IB 138, 4° (1774)
- Héraðsskjalasafn Skagfirðinga, Sauðárkrókur: HSk 32, 8° (late 19th c.)
- Private Collection, Iceland: Boðvar Kvaran, Tjaldanes, MS. V, 8.b (1914), "Fornmannasogur Nordurlanda"
- Royal Library, Stockholm: Perg. 4:o nr 6 (ca. 1400), defective
- Royal Library, Stockholm: Papp. 4:o nr 13 (ca. 1670), defective

== Editions ==
- (1884) Sagan af Klarusi keisarasyni. Reykjavík, Bjarni Bjarnarson. (Based on an eighteenth-century manuscript, giving a late version.)
- Clari Saga, appears in Riddarasögur. Edited by Bjarni Vilhjálmsson. Íslendingasagnaútgáfan & Haukdalsútgáfan. Reykjavík. 1954.
- Cederschiöld, Gustaf (1879). Clarus saga : Clari fabella. Lund, C.W.K. Gleerup. (A diplomatic edition based on the earliest texts.)
- Cederschiöld, Gustaf (1907). Altnordische Saga-Bibliothek : Heft 12 : Clári saga. Halle A. S., Verlag von Max Niemeyer. (A normalised edition of the previous.)
