= Íslenzk fornrit =

Hið íslenzka fornritafélag (Icelandic pronunciation: [hɪːð ˈistlɛnska ˈfɔ(r)tnˌrɪːtaˌfjɛːˌlaːɣ]), or The Old Icelandic Text Society is a text publication society. It is the standard publisher of Old Icelandic texts (such as the Sagas of Icelanders, Kings' sagas and bishops' sagas) with thorough introductions and comprehensive notes. Íslenzk fornrit editions are the most widely used editions in academia.

The editions that the society publishes are normalised to Classical Old Icelandic, a standard based on the language used in the Old Icelandic Homily Book (c. 1200), a standard set forth by Ludvig Wimmer in 1877. In some editions of texts originating from the 14th century, Íslenzk fornrit has included some younger linguistic features, such as later vowel mergers.

== History ==
The society was founded in 1928 by Jón Ásbjörnsson and launched its text series of medieval Icelandic literature known as Íslenzk fornrit in 1933. The society's first general editor was Sigurður Nordal. The series was founded as an Icelandic language edition along the lines of the German language series Altnordische Saga-Bibliothek (published 1892–1929). The Society's publications are distributed by the Icelandic Literary Society (Hið íslenska bókmenntafélag).

In 2011, an agreement was signed between the society and the Árni Magnússon Institute for Icelandic Studies to formalize relations between the publisher and the institute.

The editor-in-chief as of 2024 is Þórður Ingi Guðjónsson, and president of the society as of 2018 is Halldór Blöndal.
