= Bandamanna saga =

Icelandic saga

Bandamanna saga (Old Norse: [ˈbɑndɑˌmɑnːɑ ˈsɑɣɑ]; Modern Icelandic: [ˈpantaˌmanːa ˈsaːɣa]) is one of the sagas of Icelanders. It is the only saga in this category that takes place exclusively after the adoption of Christianity in the year 1000.

== Manuscripts and dating ==
The oldest surviving manuscript containing Bandamanna saga is the mid-14th-century manuscript known as Möðruvallabók (AM 132). The mid-15th-century manuscript GKS 2845 4to also contains a complete text of the saga. There are significant differences in the two versions of the saga contained in these manuscripts in terms of style, syntax, and variant poetic verses. Still, the two versions may share a common point of origin, which can perhaps be dated to the late-13th century.

== Synopsis ==
Odd son of Ofeig (Oddr Ófeigsson) leaves home, and becomes a wealthy merchant and landowner. Ospak son of Glum (Óspakr Glúmsson) asks to live with Odd at the latter's home at Mel in Miðfjörður. Odd agrees because of Ospak's connections, even though he is aware of the man's difficult character and reputation. Ospak proves to be a good worker and Odd lets him have a lot of control over the estate. Things go well until Odd wants to make a trading voyage. He talks Ospak into becoming his steward. Ospak woos a rich woman named Svala and moves to her estate after falling out with Odd over his stewardship.

Odd's livestock start to go missing. Váli, who was raised by Odd's father and now lives with Odd, promises to find out if Ospak stole them, as Odd suspects. Váli tells Ospak that he is suspected, and he is killed when he and Odd visit Ospak's home. Odd tries to bring Ospak to trial at the Thingvellir (Þingvellir), but he makes a legal error and the lawsuit fails.

Going home disappointed, Odd meets his father, Ofeig, who promises to take on the case if he is paid what Odd would have paid anybody else who fixed things. Ofeig gets the jurymen to agree to do what they want to do: condemn the infamous Ospak, and get paid into the bargain. The bribe is suspected by Thorarin, father of Ospak's wife, and his friend Styrmir. They form a band of six men known as the banded men (bandamenn) who swear an oath to take Odd to court and seek to have him fined.

The rest of the tale is about Ofeig's cunning and guile in his handling of the case and its outcome. Ofeig wins over two of the six men with even more bribes and promises one of them that Odd will marry one of his daughters. Ofeig then convinces the court to let him select two of the six jurymen who will decide the case and levy punishment. The two men are duly chosen and find Odd guilty, but they impose only an insignificant fine. Thus the two do not break their oaths with the others, and yet they still reap a reward. The story ends with Odd reconciling with his father and marrying the daughter of one of the jurymen.

== Sources ==
Ellison, Ruth C., trans. "The Saga of the Confederates." in The Sagas of Icelanders: A Selection, edited by Örnólfur Thorsson and Bernard Scudder, 463–95. New York: Penguin, 2001.
