= Dínus saga drambláta =

Old Norse chivalric saga

Dínus saga drambláta (also known, inter alia, as Saga af Dínus ok Philomena) is an Old Norse chivalric saga, assumed to have been composed first in the fourteenth century. The saga is noted for its scholarly, highbrow style.

== Summary ==
According to Kalinke and Mitchell,

The saga recounts the various maneuvers of Dínus, the son of the king of Egypt, and Philotemia, daughter of Maximilianus of Africa, to outwit each other. They have in common the idiosyncrasy of scorning the love of all members of the opposite sex. By means of a magic apple each succeeds in arousing the passion of the other, however. Before the two are finally joined in marriage, they encounter spells, shape-shifting, and various degradations imposed on one another.

== Manuscripts and transmission ==
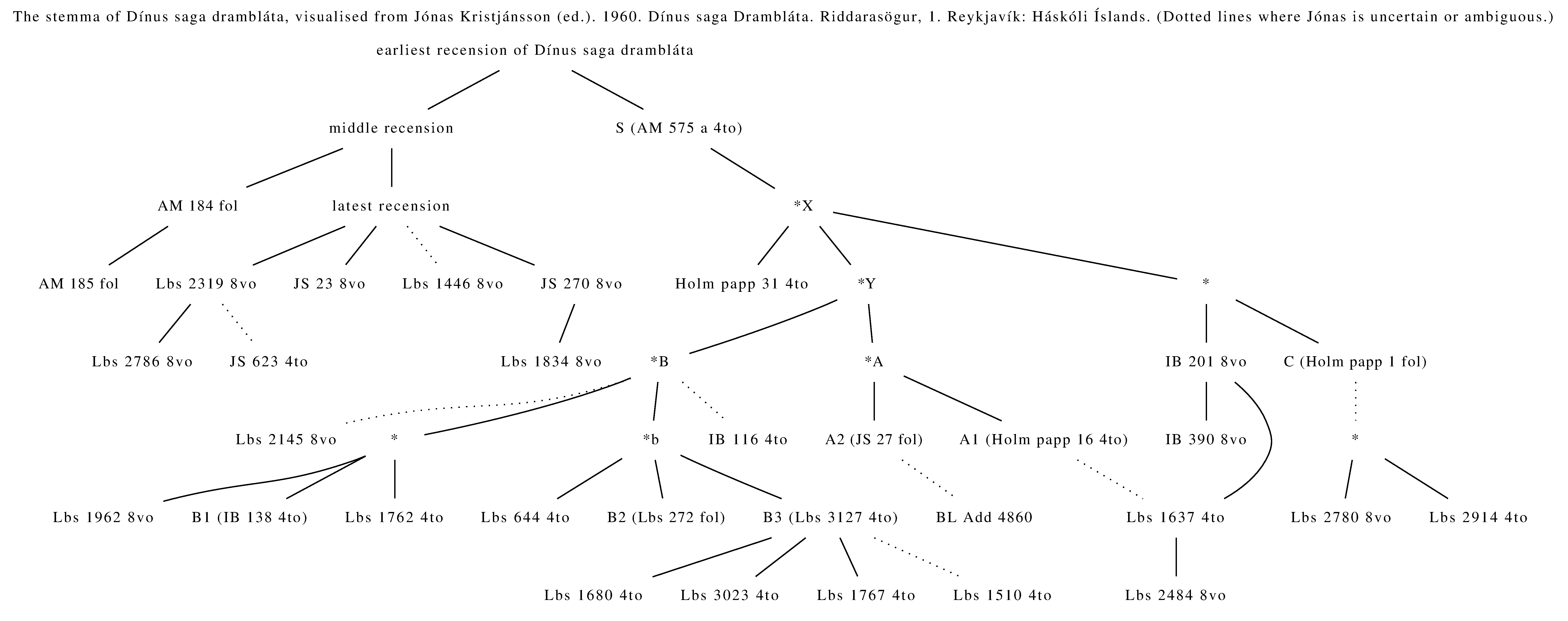
A stemma of Dínus saga drambláta, visualised from Jónas Kristjánsson (ed.). 1960. Dínus saga Drambláta. Riddarasögur, 1. Reykjavík: Háskóli Íslands. (Dotted lines where Jónas is uncertain or ambiguous.)

The saga is attested in three main versions. It was also the basis for later rímur.

Kalinke and Mitchell identified the following manuscripts of the saga:

- Arnamagnaean Institute: AM 184, fol. (17th c)
- AM 185, fol. (17th c), defective
- AM 519b, 4° (ca. 1700), excerpt
- AM 575a, 4° (15th c ), vellum, defective
- AM 576c, 4° (ca. 1700), excerpt.
- Royal Library, Copenhagen: NKS 1144, fol. (18th c), resume
- The British Library, London: Add. 4860, fol. (ca. 1800)
- National Library, Reykjavik: Lbs 272, fol. (ca. 1700)
- Lbs 644, 4° (ca. 1730-40)
- Lbs 1510, 4° (1900)
- Lbs 1637, 4° (18th c)
- Lbs 1680, 4° (1789)
- Lbs 1762, 4° (ca. 1812)
- Lbs 1767, 4° (1857–63)
- Lbs 2932, 4° (1904–05)
- Lbs 3023, 4° (1882)
- Lbs 3127, 4° (late 19th c)
- Lbs 4493, 4° (1902–03)
- Lbs 4660, 4° (1841)
- Lbs 1446, 8° (1871)
- Lbs 1834, 8° (1885)
- Lbs 1962, 8° (1850)
- Lbs 2145, 8° (1801)
- Lbs 2319, 8° (late 18th c)
- Lbs 2484, 8° (ca. 1852)
- Lbs 2780, 8° (late 19th c)
- Lbs 2786, 8° (1869)
- Lbs 2914, 8° (19th c)
- Lbs 3675, 8° (late 19th c)
- Lbs 3933, 8° (1851)
- Lbs 3943, 8° (1888?)
- JS 27 fol. (ca. 1670)
- JS 623, 4° (19th c)
- JS 23, 8° (1833)
- JS 270, 8° (late 18th c)
- ÍB 116, 4° (1786–94)
- ÍB 138, 4° (18th c)
- ÍB 201, 8° (late 17th c)
- ÍB 390, 8° (1726)
- Stofnun Arna Magnussonar, Reykjavik: Uncatalogued MS "Sagan af Dinusi dramblata" (early 20th c.)
- Héraðsskjalasafn Skagfirðinga, Sauðárkrókur: *HSk 60, 4° (1890), defective
- Private Collection, Iceland: Böðvar Kvaran, Tjaldanes, MS. III "Fornmannasogur Norðurlanda," 4.b. (1912)
- Royal Library, Stockholm: Papp. fol. nr 1 (early 17th c)
- Papp.4:onr 16 (1654)
- Papp. 4:o nr 31 (late 17th c)
- Beinecke Library, Yale University: Z 113.81 (1803).

== Editions and translations ==
- Jónas Kristjánsson (ed.), Dínus saga Drambláta, Riddarasögur, 1 (Reykjavík: Háskóli Íslands, 1960) (edits all three main versions)
- Leach, Henry Goddard, 'Dinus the Proud and Philotemia the Fair', in Angevin Britain and Scandinavia, Harvard Studies in Comparative Literature, 6 (London: Oxford University Press, 1921), pp. 271–85 (a retelling in English), https://archive.org/details/angevinbritainsc00leacuoft
