= Kirialax saga =

Icelandic romance saga

Kirjalax saga ('the saga of Kirjalax'), also Kirialax saga is a medieval Icelandic romance saga. It is noted for the array of scholarly sources its author(s) brought to bear.

== Synopsis ==
Kalinke and Mitchell summarise the saga thus:

The saga relates in a leisurely, highly rhetorical manner the fortunes of Laicus, King of Athena, and his son Kirialax. Laicus woos and, through combat, wins the hand of Mathidia, daughter of King Dagnus of Syria. After having reached maturity, their son Kirialax sets out to explore the world of his day. The account of his adventures is an extended travelogue—based on learned sources—that includes a visit to Troja and a pilgrimage to Akrsborg to see the True Cross. At the conclusion of his travels, Kirialax marries Florencia, daughter of King Lotharius of Grikkland. He is crowned king of Grikkland and the seven kingdoms subordinate to it. Two sons, Vallterus and Villifer, are born to the royal couple; they emulate father and grandfather.

== Manuscripts ==
Kalinke and Mitchell identified the following manuscripts of the saga:

- Arnamagnæan Institute, Copenhagen: AM 395, fol. (18th c); AM 489, 4° (ca. 1450), vellum, defective; AM 532, 4° (ca. 1700), defective; AM 567, 4°, XV (early 15th c), vellum, 1 leaf; AM 588g, 4° (ca. 1700), defective; AM 589a, 4° (15th c), vellum, defective.
- Royal Library, Copenhagen: NKS 1144, fol. (late 18th c), excerpt; NKS 1779, 4° (late 18th c).
- The British Library, London: Add. 4859, fol. (1695–97).
- National Library, Reykjavik: Lbs 633, fol. (18th c); JS 241, 8° (18th-19th c); JS 390, 8° (18th-19th c), excerpt.
- Héraðsskjalasafn Borgarfjarðar, Borgarnes: MS 2 (after 1860).
- Beinecke Library, Yale University: Z 113.85 (19th c), lacks conclusion.

== Editions and translations ==
- Kalund, Kr., ed. Kirialax saga. Samfund til Udgivelse af gammel nordisk Litteratur, 43. Copenhagen: Samfund til Udgivelse af gammel nordisk Litteratur, 1917. Edition, based on AM 589a, 4°; AM 489,4°; AM 532,4°.
- Alenka Divjak, Studies in the Traditions of Kirialax saga (Ljubljana: Institut Nove revije, zavod za humanistiko, 2009). ISBN 9789619246320; 9619246322. English translation, pp. 297–352.

== See also ==
- Alexios I Komnenos, Byzantine emperor named Kirjalax in Játvarðar Saga.
