= Einarr Hafliðason =

Icelandic priest and writer

Einar Hafliðason (medieval Icelandic Einarr Hafliðason, 15 September 1307 – 22 September 1393) was an Icelandic priest and author.

== Biography ==
Einar became a priest in 1334 with the benefice of Höskuldsstaðir á Skagaströnd and in 1343 the Archbishop of Nidaros granted him Breiðabólstaður í Vesturhópi, one of the best farms in the region, in what is now Vestur-Húnavatnssýsla, in Northern Iceland. Einarr held this benefice until his death. Einarr was one of the leading clerics in the diocese of Hólar, taking various official roles. He is best known, however, for his writing: he began the annal Lögmannsannáll, a chronicle which Einarr continued up to 1361, when it was taken over by someone else. He almost certainly composed Lárentius saga, a biography of Einarr's friend and teacher Lárentíus Kálfsson, sometime after 1346; and wrote or otherwise appeared in a number of official documents. Einar was thus a prominent member of the North Icelandic Benedictine School, and Laurentius saga is an important witness to the lives of its members.

In 1381, Einar also translated the miracle-story Atburðr á Finnmörk from Latin into Icelandic. Though short, the text provides important evidence for relations between Norse and Saami people in medieval Norway.

Einar was the son of Hafliði Steinsson, who had been a priest of the Norwegian king, a ráðsmaðr (steward) at Hólar from 1292 to 1308 and finally the priest at Breiðabólstaður í Vesturhópi until his death in 1319; his mother was Hafliði's concubine Rannveig Gestsdóttir. Einar was sent to study with Lárentíus Kálfsson at the monastery of Þingeyri at the age of 10, later becoming a follower and secretary for Lárentíus. Too ill at the time to ordain Einarr, Lárentíus sent Einarr to the southern diocese of Skálholt for consecration there by Bishop Jón Halldórsson in 1332.

Einarr is also one of the few fourteenth-century Icelanders known to have travelled outside Scandinavia. According to his annals, in 1347 Einarr "geck ... af landi brott. ok for til paua gardz ok var j Auinione .ix. nætr. for vm Frankarike aftr ok fram. ok var j Paris. vm nockorn tima" ("went ... away from the land [Norway], and travelled to the papal court, and was in Avignon for nine nights, and travelled widely in France, and was in Paris for some time").

Einarr's son was Árni, a farmer at Auðbrekka í Hörgárdal, the father of Þorleifr Árnason.

== Sources ==
- https://timarit.is/view_page_init.jsp?pageId=3552604, 'Fornir bæir undir Hekluhrauni', Sunnudagsblað Tímans, 5. April 1964.
- https://timarit.is/view_page_init.jsp?pageId=3560386, 'Pétur Nikulásson Hólabiskup', Sunnudagsblað Tímans, 6. June 1971.
- Elton, Oliver (trans.), The Life of Laurence Bishop of Hólar in Iceland (London: Rivington, 1890), available at https://archive.org/details/lifeoflaurencebi00einauoft.
- Árni Björnsson (ed.), Laurentius saga biskups, Rit handritastofunar Íslands, 3 (Reykjavík: Handritastofnun Íslands, 1969).
- Guðrún Ása Grímsdóttir (ed.), Biskupa sögur III - Árna saga biskups, Lárentius saga biskups, Söguþáttr Jóns Halldórssonar biskups, Biskupa ættir, Íslenzk fornrit, 17 (Reykjavík: Hið Íslenzka fornritfélag, 1998).
