= Jón Halldórsson =

Jón Halldórsson, OP (Modern Icelandic: [ˈjouːn ˈhaltour̥sɔn]; c. 1275 – 2 February 1339) was a Norwegian Catholic prelate who served as Bishop of Iceland from 1322 to 1339. He previously served in the Diocese of Skálholt and was a member of the Dominican Order.

Halldórsson grew up in Norway and has been assumed to have been of Norwegian birth, though since his mother's name, Freygerðr, is unknown outside Iceland, he may in fact have been (half) Icelandic. He studied both theology in Paris and canon law in Bologna, and his learning is seen as remarkable in contemporary Icelandic sources; Laurentius saga has him as one of Iceland's two best Latinists at his time, as fluent in Latin as in his mother-tongue.

He was elected bishop following Grímr Skútuson and consecrated on 1 August 1322 but did not arrive in Iceland until the following year. He was noted for bringing the Icelandic Church more closely into line with canon law and for his skill as a preacher and storyteller; the introduction to Klári saga claims that it is based on a Latin romance discovered by Jón in France, and there is a strong case that Jón indeed produced the saga, while Jón's fame as a gatherer of stories is clear from Laurentius saga. He died in Norway on Candlemas 1339.

== See also ==
- List of Skálholt bishops
- Jóns þáttr biskups Halldórssonar

Preceded by Grímur Skútuson	Bishop of Skálholt; 1322–1339	Succeeded by Jón Indriðason
