= Guðmundur Arason =

Catholic bishop in 12th-century Iceland

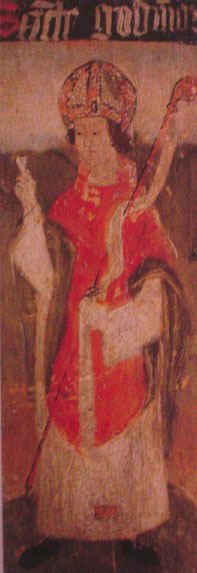
A drawing of Guðmundur from a medieval manuscript

Guðmundur Arason (Modern Icelandic: [ˈkvʏðmʏntʏr ˈaːrasɔn]; 1161 – March 16, 1237; Old Norse: Guðmundr Arason [ˈɡuðˌmundr ˈɑrɑˌson]) was an influential 12th and 13th century Icelandic saintly bishop who took part in increasing the powers of the Catholic Church in medieval Iceland. His story is recorded in several manuscripts, most notably Prestssaga Guðmundar góða. He is often referred to as Guðmundur góði (Icelandic: [ˈkouːðɪ], Old Norse: [ˈɡoːðe]; Guðmundr or Gudmund the Good).

== Life ==
Guðmundur was born an illegitimate child in 1161, in Grjótá in Hörgárdalur, Iceland. He was ordained as priest in 1185 at the age of 24. A decade later, he had become one of the most influential clergymen in the Icelandic commonwealth, culminating in his election as bishop of Hólar (the northern one of the two Icelandic bishop seats) in 1203.

He served for some time as house priest to Kolbeinn Tumason, an Icelandic chieftain. In his years as a simple priest, he did not exhibit any interest in strengthening the Church as an institution, and did not seek wealth or other worldly goods. However, he acquired a reputation as pious and devout man, and even as a miracle-worker.

Upon his appointment as bishop, he was committed to continuing the work of his predecessors: namely, preserving the power structure of the Church. However, things quickly went awry. He was amongst the clerical visionaries who praised the virtue of poverty and believed the Church had been led astray by the acquisition of wealth. Both his contemporaries and later generations compared him with Thomas Becket. Guðmundur was generous with the Church's holdings, and soon a great number of impoverished dependents settled around Hólar. His generosity aroused the ire of local chieftains, and tensions escalated, leading to disputes concerning the judicial powers of the see. Guðmundur wanted the see to remain independent from the chieftains who had elected him, and made the first documented attempt in Iceland to maintain the judicial powers of the church over its own members.

== Conflict with the chieftains ==
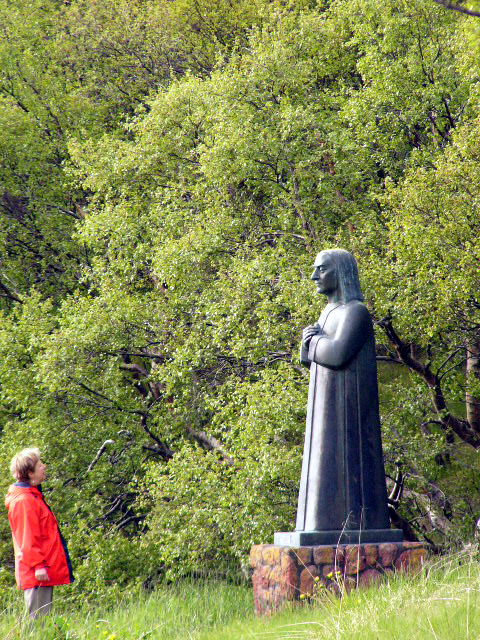
A statue of bishop Guðmundur near Hólar

Kolbeinn Tumason, chieftain of the Ásbirningar clan, had played an important part in Guðmundur's election, but in 1205 a dispute arose between the two. The cause of the dispute was a charge made by Kolbeinn against a priest who owed him money. According to church policy, the church had exclusive judicial powers in such matters. In the autumn of 1208, Kolbeinn travelled with a body of men to Hólar to carry out a sentence against a priest guilty of impregnating a woman. Kolbeinn's men clashed with the bishop's followers in what is known as Víðinesbardagi ("The Battle of Víðines") -- Kolbeinn and several of his men died in the conflict, which went in favour of the bishop. By 1209, Guðmundur's position was untenable and he was forced to flee the bishopric of Hólar.

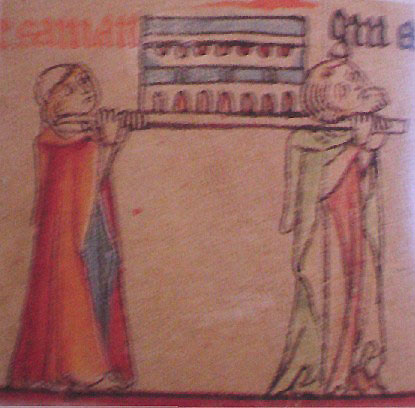
Men carrying a holy casket like that which contained Guðmundur's remains

Guðmundur spent 1214–1218 in Norway, by order of the archbishop, and when he returned home, he played things more delicately. Nevertheless, a large group of poor people were soon living on the Church's charity again. Arnór Tumason, the new leader of the Ásbirnings, travelled to Hólar and scattered the bishop's impoverished followers—Guðmundur remained Arnór's captive for a year. He then travelled around Iceland for three years with his followers. Upon the death of Arnór, Tumi Sighvatsson rose to power in Skagafjörður and claimed Hólar as his own. The bishop's men murdered Tumi in 1222 and Guðmundur was forced to flee to Grímsey, where he was intercepted and made a captive once again. Again, he was sent to Norway to face the archbishop's wrath. He returned to Iceland an old man, and played no significant further part in politics to his death in 1237.

== Sainthood ==
The story of Guðmundr was very much to the Church's advantage. His disputes with the chieftains soon faded from collective memory, but his piety and generosity remained a legend. Within living memory, he was regarded as a holy man (or saint), and in 1315 his physical remains were interred in a grand ceremony under the auspices of Auðunn rauði Þorbergsson, the bishop of Hólar. Guðmundr thus became a sort of national saint, although the Catholic Church has to this day not acknowledged his sainthood. By the time a concerted effort was made to establish Guðmundr's sanctity in the first half of the fourteenth century, papal permission was both necessary and expensive. The steady development of different versions of his saga included the incorporation of miracles not in the earliest versions, such as the story of his encounter with the demon Selkolla.
