= Laurentius saga =

Icelandic bishops' saga

Laurentius saga (modern Icelandic Lárentíus saga) is an Icelandic saga, written in the third quarter of the fourteenth century, describing the life of Icelandic bishop Laurentius Kálfsson, thus covering the period 1267–1331.

== Origins ==
The presumed author, Einarr Hafliðason, was a student and friend of Laurentius. Although incomplete, Laurentius saga is considered to be one of the best written of the early Icelandic biographies, as well as being an important source of information about the teaching and education methods of the day. It can be seen as one of the products of the North Icelandic Benedictine School.

== Manuscripts ==
The saga is preserved primarily in two vellum manuscripts containing different versions of the saga: A (Reykjavík, Stofnun Árna Magnússonar, AM 406 a I 4to), written in Hólar around 1530, possibly by síra Tómas Eiríksson; and B (Reykjavík, Stofnun Árna Magnússonar, AM 180 b fol.), also written in Hólar, this time around 1500. The sagas contain slightly different information, suggesting that both have shortened an earlier version somewhat, but of the two B seems to be the shorter. Both have missing pages and must to some extent be supplemented from Þ (Reykjavík, Stofnun Árna Magnússonar, AM 404 4to), copied by Jón Pálsson at the behest of Þorlákur Skúlason, the bishop of Hólar, around 1640, when the manuscripts were more complete. This mostly copies B but another of Þórlákur's scribes, Brynjólfur Jónsson, filled in the gaps from A.

== Bibliography ==
- Einarr Hafliðason. (1890). The Life of Laurence, Bishop of Hólar in Iceland (Laurentius saga), trans. by Oliver Elton. London Rivington. Available online.
- Árni Björnsson (ed.), Laurentius saga biskups, Rit handritastofunar Íslands, 3 (Reykjavík: Handritastofnun Íslands, 1969).
- Guðrún Ása Grímsdóttir (ed.), Biskupa sögur III: Árna saga biskups, Lárentius saga biskups, Söguþáttr Jóns Halldórssonar biskups, Biskupa ættir, Íslenzk fornrit, 17 (Reykjavík: Hið Íslenzka fornritfélag, 1998).
- Neijmann, Daisy. (2007). A History of Icelandic Literature, Volume 5. University of Nebraska Press.
- Patzuk-Russell, Ryder and Yoav Tirosh. (2024). "Icelandic Hospitals, Clergy, and Disability in the Saga of Bishop Lárentíus". Mirator. 24 (1): 1-17.
- Sigurdson, Erika. (2016). The Church in Fourteenth-Century Iceland: The Formation of an Elite Clerical Identity. Leiden: Brill.ISBN 978-0803233461.
