= Jón Ögmundsson =

Icelandic bishop (1052–1121)

Saint Jón Ögmundsson
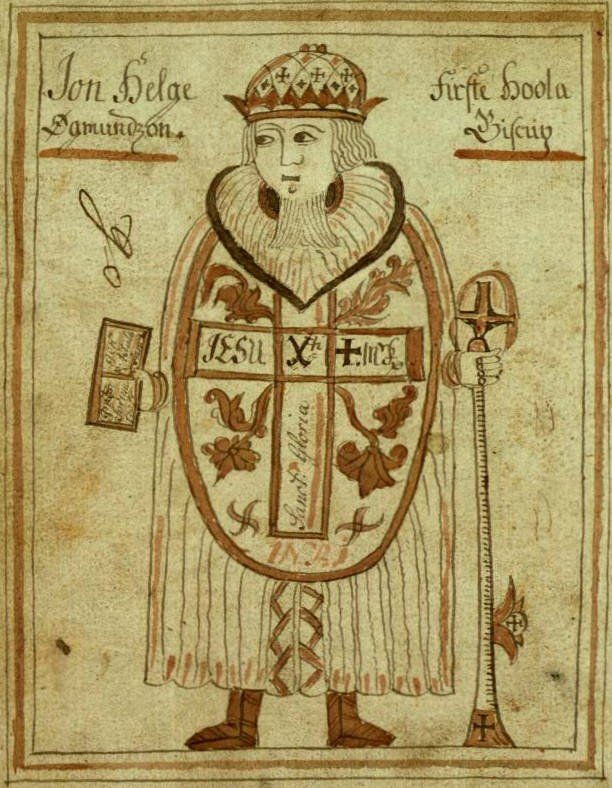
- Bishop Jón holds a crook and a book in this illustration from a 19th century Icelandic manuscript

Bishop
- Born: 1052
- Died: 23 April 1121
- Venerated in: Catholic Church; Anglican Communion; Lutheranism
- Canonized: 1201 by Pope Innocent III
- Major shrine: Basilica-Cathedral of Christ the King (Roman Catholic)
- Feast: 23 April
- Attributes: bishop's staff, miter, book

Jón Ögmundsson or Ögmundarson (Latin: Ioannes Ögmundi filius; 1052–23 April 1121), also known as John of Hólar and St. Jón Ögmundarson or Ögmundsson (Icelandic: Jón helgi Ögmundarson/Ögmundsson), was an Icelandic Catholic bishop. In 1106, the second Icelandic diocese, Hólar, was created in the north of Iceland, and Jón was appointed its first bishop. He served as bishop there until his death.

== Biography ==
Jón was born in Breiðabólstaður in the Fljótshlíð area of southern Iceland, the son of a priest. He first studied under Ísleifur Gissurarson, Iceland's first bishop, in Skálholt and went on to further studies in Denmark and Norway and a pilgrimage to Rome, traveling back to Iceland from Paris with Sæmundr the Learned upon completion of his studies.

Around the turn of the 12th century, Norway, Iceland's suzerain, sought to establish a second bishopric for the north of Iceland, and Jón was installed as its first bishop in 1106, following ordination by the Pope in Rome.

As the Bishop of Hólar, he founded a school at Hólar, the first European-style school in Iceland, and hired two foreign teachers.

He was married twice, but he had no children.

== Legacy ==
A religious purist, Jón made it his mission to uproot all remnants of paganism. This included changing the names of the days of the week. Thus Óðinsdagr, "day of Odin", became miðvikudagr, "mid-week day" and the days of Týr and Thor became the prosaic "third day" and "fifth day".

Jón's names for the days are still in use in Iceland today but despite the success of this cosmetic reform it appears that Jón did not manage to uproot the memory of the heathen gods. More than a century after his death the Prose Edda and Poetic Edda were written, preserving large amounts of pagan myth and poetry.

He also laid the foundation for Hólar to become the cultural center of northern Iceland for many centuries. His school in Hólar taught singing, then a novel school subject in Iceland, and he is therefore credited with the beginning of music education in Iceland.

Jón's relics were translated to the cathedral of Hólar on 3 March 1200, which made him a local saint. His feast day, 23 April (the date of his death) was decreed a holy day of obligation for all Iceland at the Althing in the summer of 1200. These two events are distinguished in the Icelandic annals: Jón was not "made a saint" by the Althing.

Jón never received as much veneration as the first Icelandic saint, Thorlak Thorhallsson, and was venerated primarily in the diocese of Hólar and at his birthplace, Breiðabólstaður in Fljótshlíð; relics were preserved at both these places.

== Jóns saga ==
A Latin life (vita) about St. Jón was probably written by the monk Gunnlaugr Leifsson of the monastery at Þingeyrar in the early thirteenth century. Composed nearly a century after Jón's lifetime, its historical value is dubious. It is a classic example of hagiography for a confessor saint, aiming to praise the saintly virtues of its subject rather than record accurate historical information. The Latin original has not survived, but it was translated into Icelandic (as Jóns saga, Jóns saga Helga ["Saga of Saint Jón"] etc.) shortly after its composition and revised on subsequent occasions.

=== Editions and translations ===
- Jóns saga Hólabyskups ens Helga. Ed. Peter Foote. (Copenhagen: Editiones Arnamagnæanae Series A vol. 14, 2003)
- Biskupa sögur I (Íslensk Fornrit XV). Eds. Sigurgeir Steingrímsson, Ólafur Halldórsson, and Peter Foote. (Reykjavík: 2003).
- "Saga of Bishop Jón of Hólar", in Medieval Hagiography: An Anthology, ed. Tom Head. (NY and London, Garland: 2000) 595–626. Paperback edition by Routledge: 2002. pp. 595–626. (A partial translation.)
- The Saga of St. Jón of Hólar, ed. and trans. by Margaret Cormack and Peter Foote (Tempe: Arizona Center for Medieval and Renaissance Studies, 2020) ISBN 9780866986373
