= Hólar =

- Village
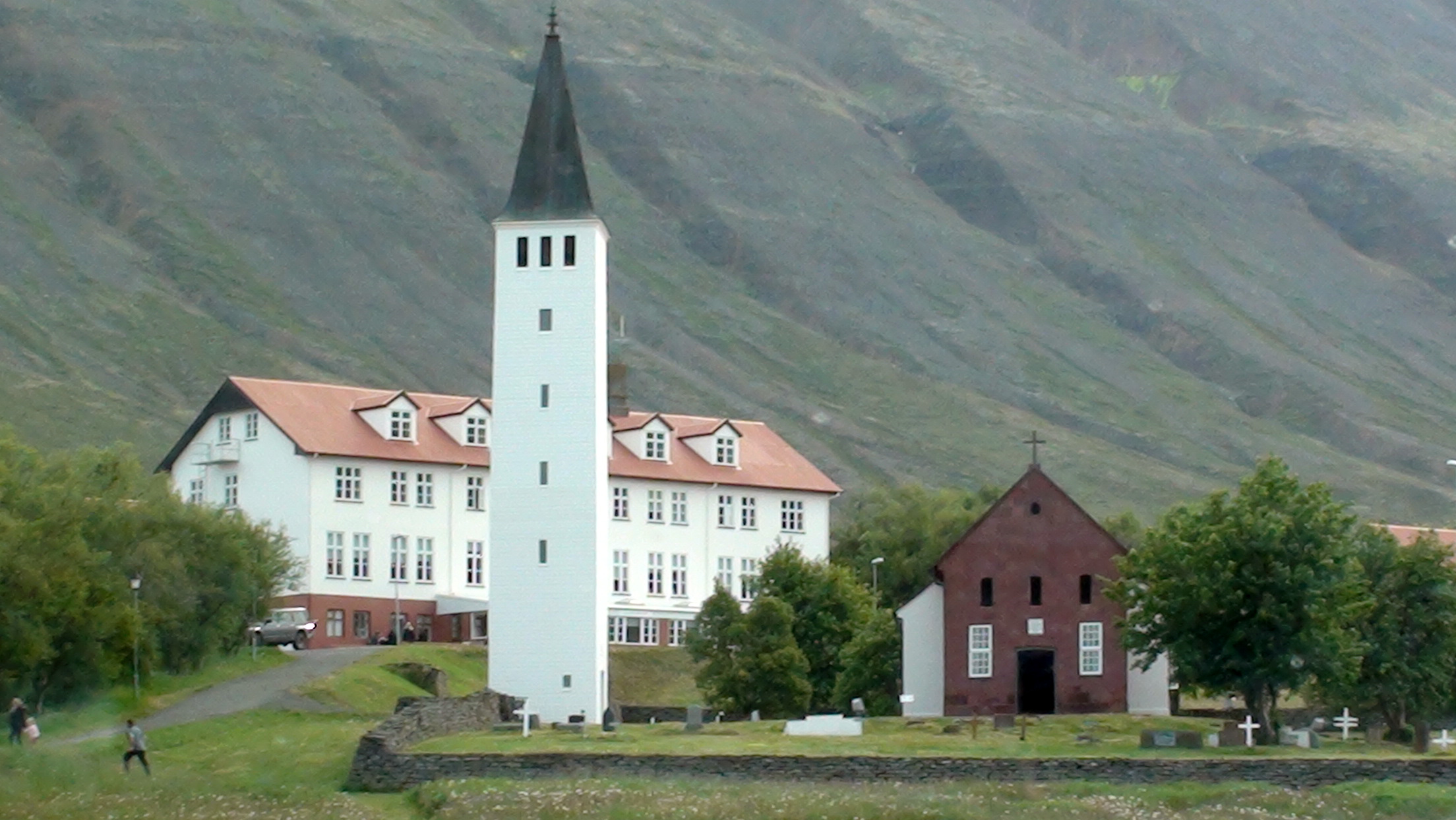
- Hólar Cathedral

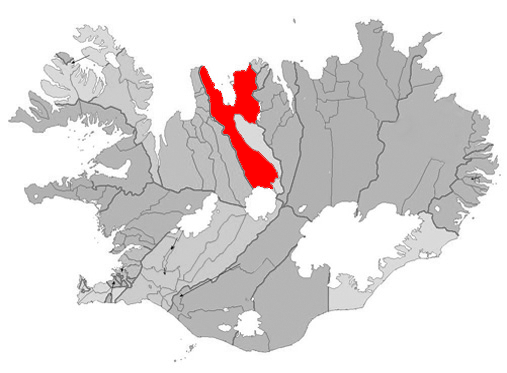
- Location of the Municipality of Skagafjörður

- Location within Iceland
- Coordinates: 65°44′N 19°07′W
- Country: Iceland
- Constituency: Northwest Constituency
- Region: Northwestern Region
- Municipality: Skagafjörður

Population (January 2011)
  - Total: 89
- Post code: 551
- Website: www.holar.is

Hólar (Icelandic pronunciation: [ˈhouːlar̥]; also Hólar í Hjaltadal [ˈhouːlar i ˈçal̥taˌtaːl̥]) is a small community in the Skagafjörður district of northern Iceland.

== Location ==
Hólar is in the valley Hjaltadalur, some 379 km (235.50 mi) from the national capital of Reykjavík. It has a population of around 100. It is the site of the main campus of Hólar University College, a site of historical buildings and archeological excavation, home to the Center for the history of the Icelandic horse, Hólar Cathedral, and the turf house Nýibær.

The first printing press in Iceland was introduced to Hólar in 1530. Hólar Agricultural College was founded 1882, and was renamed Holar University College in 2003.

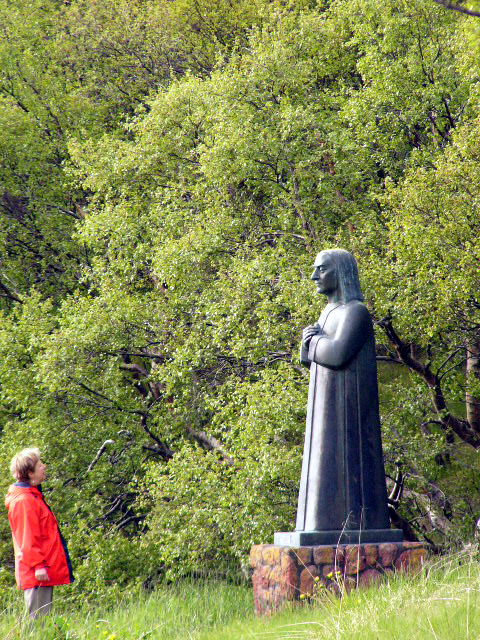
Monument of bishop Guðmundur Arason

== History ==
Near the end of the 10th century, King Olaf I of Norway convinced his subjects to accept Christianity, then sent Christian missionaries to Iceland, where they were quickly accepted; around 1000 Icelanders made a peaceful decision that all should convert. Despite this, the godar, Iceland's ruling class, maintained their power. Some built their own churches; others were ordained.

Holar was the Episcopal see for northern Iceland (whereas Skálholt served the same function for southern Iceland), and a cultural and educational centre for almost seven centuries (1106–1798). It was founded as a diocese in 1106 by bishop Jón Ögmundsson and soon became one of Iceland's two main centers of learning. It played an important part in the medieval politics of Iceland, and was the seat of Guðmundur Arason in his struggle with Icelandic chieftains during the time of the commonwealth. Under Jón Arason, Hólar was the last remaining stronghold of Catholicism in Iceland during the Reformation. The religious conflict was brutally resolved in 1550 when the last Catholic bishop, Jón Arason, was taken to the south of Iceland and beheaded, with his two sons, in Skálholt. The best known Lutheran bishop of Hólar was Guðbrandur Þorláksson. The construction of the present church is believed to have been completed in 1763.

== See also ==
- List of bishops of Hólar

== Photo gallery ==
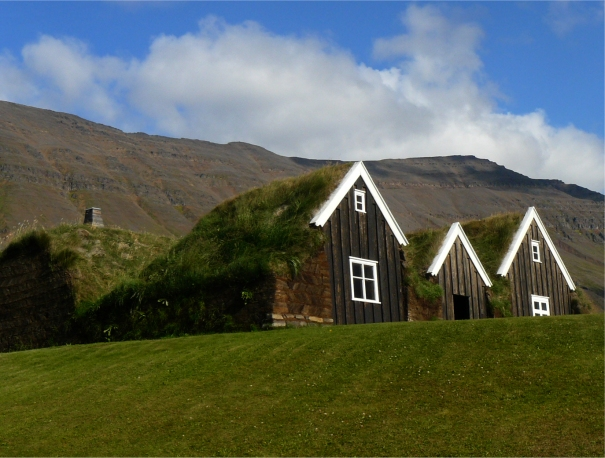
Turf houses in Hólar

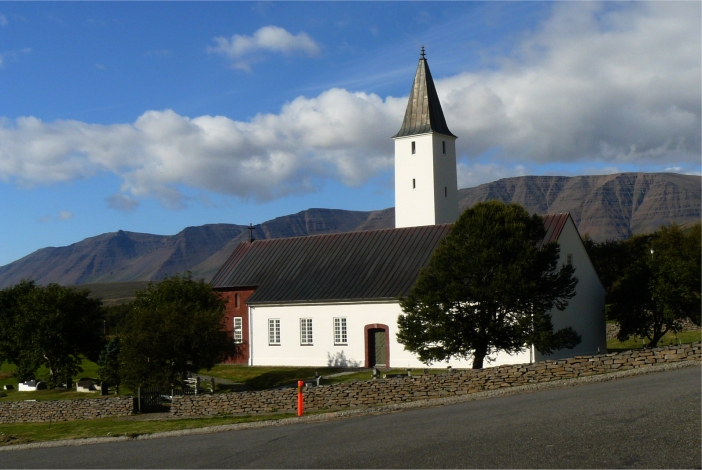
Hólar Cathedral

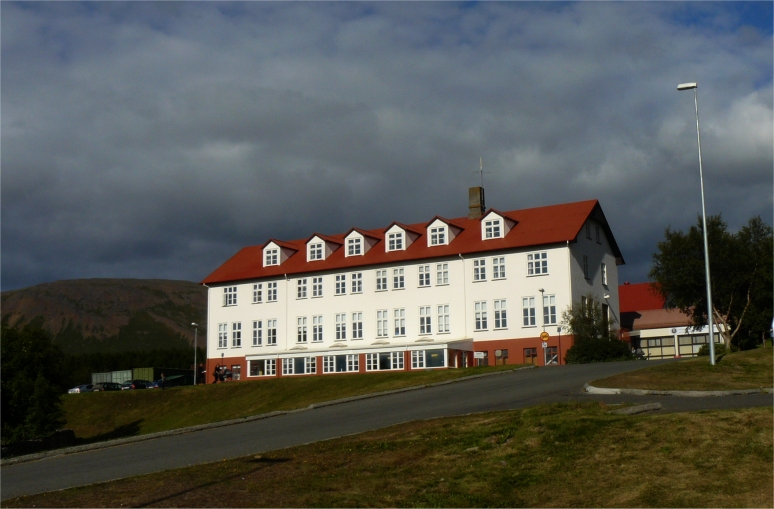
Hólar University College

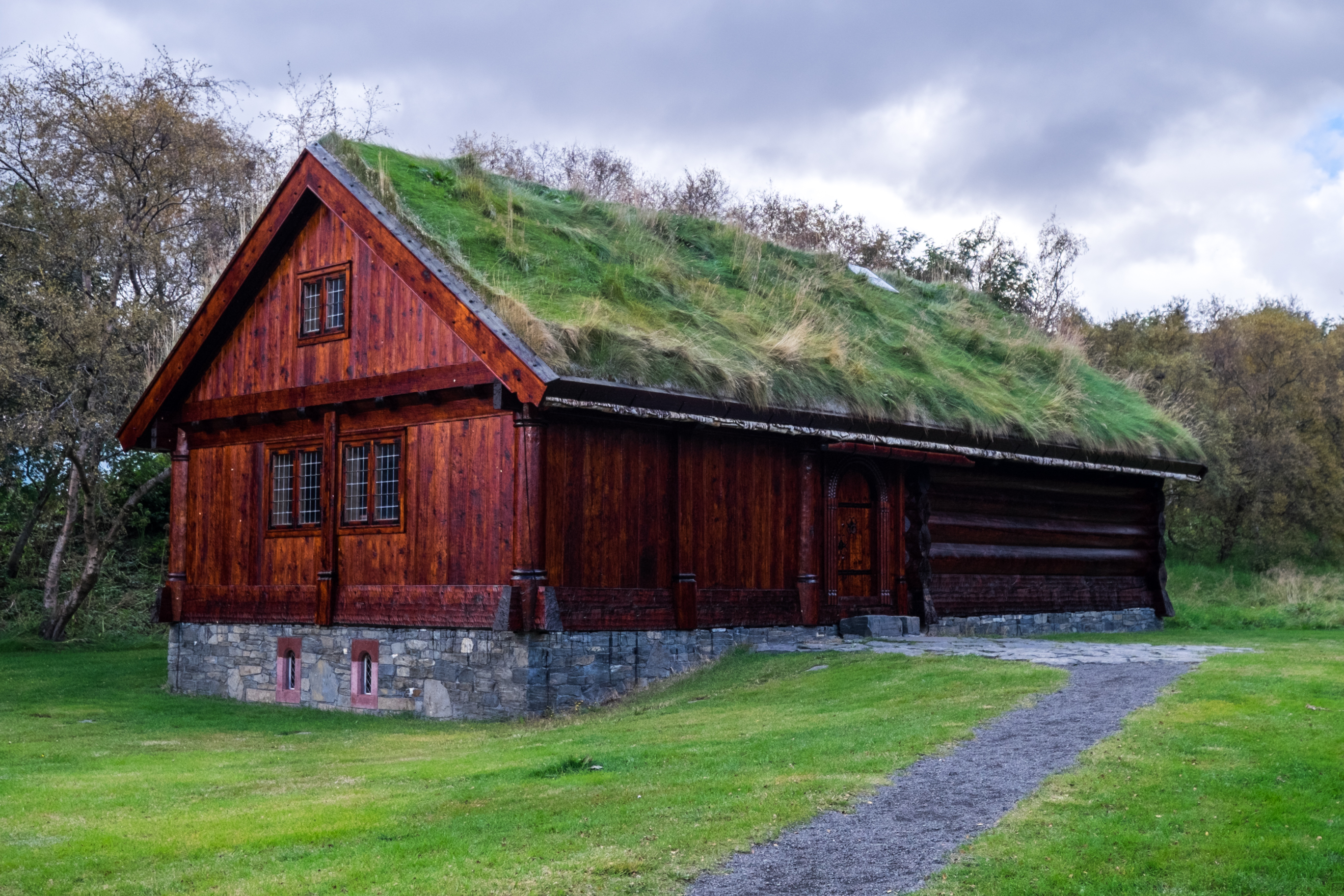
Replica of Bishop's office

== Sources ==
- This article incorporates text from a publication now in the public domain: Chisholm, Hugh, ed (1911). "Hólar". Encyclopædia Britannica (Eleventh ed.). Cambridge University Press.
