= Bishop of Reykjavík =

Catholic bishopric in Iceland

- Bishopric

catholic
- Incumbent: Dávid Tencer

Information
- First holder: Hendrik Hubert Frehen
- Established: 18 October 1968
- Diocese: Reykjavík
- Cathedral: Landakotskirkja

Website
- Website of the Diocese

The Bishop of Reykjavík is the head of the Diocese of Reykjavík, part of the Catholic Church in Iceland.

The Norsemen who settled in Iceland from the end of the ninth century worshipped the Æsir (the Norse gods). The country converted about 999.

In 1056, the country was given a bishop of its own, suffragan to the Archbishop of Hamburg, with his see at Skálholt, while in 1106 a bishopric was established at Hólar. These two dioceses were first under the Archbishop of Lund, later (1152) under that of Trondheim, and until the middle of the 16th century were in close communion with Rome.

The bishops were selected by the Alþingi, but the nominees were consecrated by the metropolitan. Many of their prelates were distinguished for their virtue and wisdom. The priests of Iceland frequently went to French and English universities for studies. Many among the clergy and laity made pilgrimages to shrines of both East and West. Canon law was in force by the year 1053. Under the influence of the Church the old laws (Grágás) were written down in 1117, but civil strife led to recognition of Norwegian hegemony.

Upon the death of Haakon VI of Norway in 1380, his son Olaf, who since 1376 had ruled Denmark, ascended the Norwegian throne and thus effected a centuries-long union of Denmark and Iceland, which later facilitated the spread of Lutheranism during the Reformation. The Althing (Icelandic parliament) was not suppressed until 1800.

== List of ordinaries ==
The following most recent heads of the Catholic Church in Iceland were bishops:

Vicars Apostolic of Iceland
No.	Bishop	Term	Appointor	Coat of arms
1	Martin Meulenberg	1923 - 1941	Pope Pius XI	
2	Jóhannes Gunnarsson	1924 - 1967	Pope Pius XII	

Bishops of Reykjavík
No.	Bishop	Term	Appointor	Coat of arms
1	Hendrik Hubert Frehen	1968 - 1986	Pope Paul VI	
2	Alfred Jolson	1987 - 1994	John Paul II	
3	Joannes Gijsen	1996 - 2007	John Paul II	
4	Pierre Bürcher	2007 - 2015	Benedict XVI	
5	Dávid Bartimej Tencer	2015-	Pope Francis	

== See also ==
- Christ the King Cathedral, Reykjavík (Iceland)
- Catholic Church in Iceland
- Christianity in Iceland
