= Alfred Jolson =

American prelate of the Roman Catholic Church

His Excellency, The Most Reverend Alfred James Jolson SJ
- Bishop of Reykjavík
- Church: Roman Catholic Church
- See: Diocese of Reykjavík
- In office: February 6, 1988 – March 21, 1994
- Predecessor: Msgr. Hendrik H. Frehen S.M.M.
- Successor: Msgr. Joannes B.M. Gijsen

Orders
- Ordination: 14 June 1958
- Consecration: 6 February 1988 by John Joseph O'Connor
- Rank: Bishop

Personal details
- Born: June 18, 1928 Bridgeport, United States
- Died: March 21, 1994 (aged 65) Pittsburgh, United States
- Education: Boston College, Harvard Business School, Pontifical Gregorian University

Alfred James Jolson, S.J., (June 18, 1928 – March 21, 1994), was an American prelate of the Catholic Church who served as the Bishop of Reykjavík from 1988 until his death in 1994.

After several years of teaching in various Jesuit educational institutions in the United States (including Saint Joseph's University, Philadelphia), Italy, Zimbabwe (where he taught at St. George's College in Harare) and Iraq, Jolson was appointed to the Diocese of Reykjavík by Pope John Paul II in 1987. Jolson died suddenly in 1994.

== See also ==
- Bishop of Reykjavík
- Diocese of Reykjavík
- Christ the King Cathedral, Reykjavík (Iceland)
- Roman Catholicism in Iceland
- Christianity in Iceland
