= Pierre Bürcher =

Prelate of the Roman Catholic Church

His Excellency Pierre Bürcher
- Bishop Emeritus of Reykjavík
- Church: Roman Catholic Church
- See: Titular Bishopric of Maximiana in Byzacena; Diocese of Reykjavík
- In office: Maximiana in Byzacena: 29 January 1994 - 30 October 2007; Reykjavík: 30 October 2007 - 18 September 2015; Chur: from 20 May 2019 to 19 March 2021 (as apostolic administrator)
- Predecessor: Maximiana in Byzacena: Alfred Clifton Hughes; Reykjavík: Joannes Baptist Matthijs Gijsen; Chur: Vitus Huonder (as Bishop)
- Successor: Maximiana in Byzacena: Gerardo Alimane Alminaza; Reykjavík: Dávid Bartimej Tencer; Chur: Joseph Maria Bonnemain (as Bishop)
- Previous posts: Titular Bishop of Maximiana in Byzacena; Auxiliary Bishop of Lausanne, Genève and Fribourg; Bishop of Reykjavík; Apostolic Administrator of Chur

Orders
- Ordination: 27 March 1971
- Consecration: 12 March 1994 by Pierre Mamie

Personal details
- Born: 20 December 1945 (age 80) Fiesch, Switzerland

Pierre Bürcher (Swiss Standard German: [pjɛːr ˈbʏrçər]; born 20 December 1945) is a Swiss prelate of the Catholic Church. He was Bishop of Reykjavík, Iceland, from 2007 to 2015. He served as apostolic administrator of the diocese of Chur between 2019 and 2021.

== Biography ==
Pierre Bürcher was born on 20 December 1945 in Fiesch, Valais. He was ordained a priest on 27 March 1971. After filling a variety of pastoral assignments, he spent the year 1989–90 studying clerical formation and then became rector of the major seminary of the Lausanne Diocese from 1990 to 1994.

On 3 February 1994, Pope John Paul II appointed him Titular bishop of Maximiana in Byzacena and auxiliary bishop of the Diocese of Lausanne, Genève and Fribourg. He received his episcopal consecration on 12 March. His tenure as episcopal vicar for the Canton of Vaud was marked by a longstanding dispute about personnel as the authorities with financial control did not support the staffing his pastoral program required. The bishop of the Diocese eventually relieved him of his responsibilities for the Canton.

On 30 October 2007, Pope Benedict XVI appointed him Bishop of Reykjavík. John Paul had made him a member of the Congregation for the Oriental Churches in 2004, and Pope Francis confirmed his membership for another five-year term in 2014. In 2010 he participated in the Synod of Bishops on the Church in the Middle East.

Pope Francis accepted his resignation on 18 September 2015, at the age of 69, because of health problems linked to volcanic dust. In retirement he lived in Jerusalem and spent part of the year accompanying pilgrimages.

On 20 May 2019, Francis appointed him apostolic administrator of the Diocese of Chur, Switzerland.

== See also ==
- Roman Catholicism in Iceland
- Christianity in Iceland
