= Hendrik Hubert Frehen =

Dutch clergyman and bishop

Hendrik Hubert Frehen S.M.M.
- Bishop of Reykjavík
- Church: Catholic Church
- Diocese: Diocese of Reykjavík
- In office: 18 October 1968 – 31 October 1986
- Predecessor: Jóhannes Gunnarsson
- Successor: Alfred Jolson

Orders
- Ordination: 18 December 1943
- Consecration: 8 December 1968 by Jan Theunissen

Personal details
- Born: 24 January 1917 Waubach (part of present-day Landgraaf), Limburg, Kingdom of the Netherlands
- Died: 31 October 1986 (aged 69) Reykjavík, Iceland
- Coat of arms

Hendrik Hubert Frehen (24 January 1917 in Landgraaf – 31 October 1986) was a Dutch clergyman and bishop for the Roman Catholic Diocese of Reykjavik. He was ordained in 1943, and appointed bishop in 1968.
