= Diocese of Reykjavík =

Catholic diocese for all Iceland

Coordinates: 64.1474°N 21.9486°W

Diocese of Reykjavík Dioecesis Reykiavikensis Biskupsdæmi Reykjavíkur

Catholic
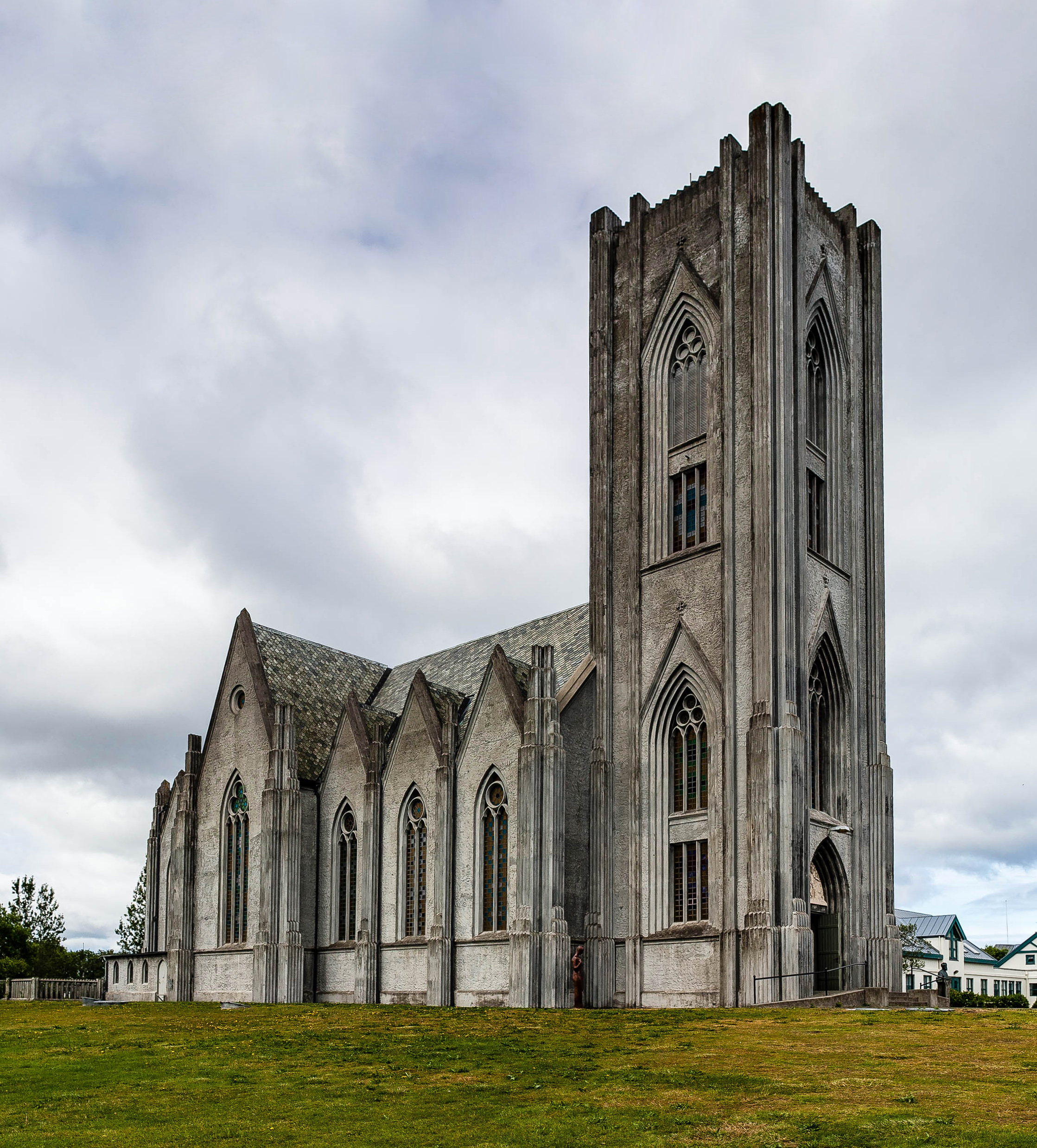
- Christ the King Cathedral

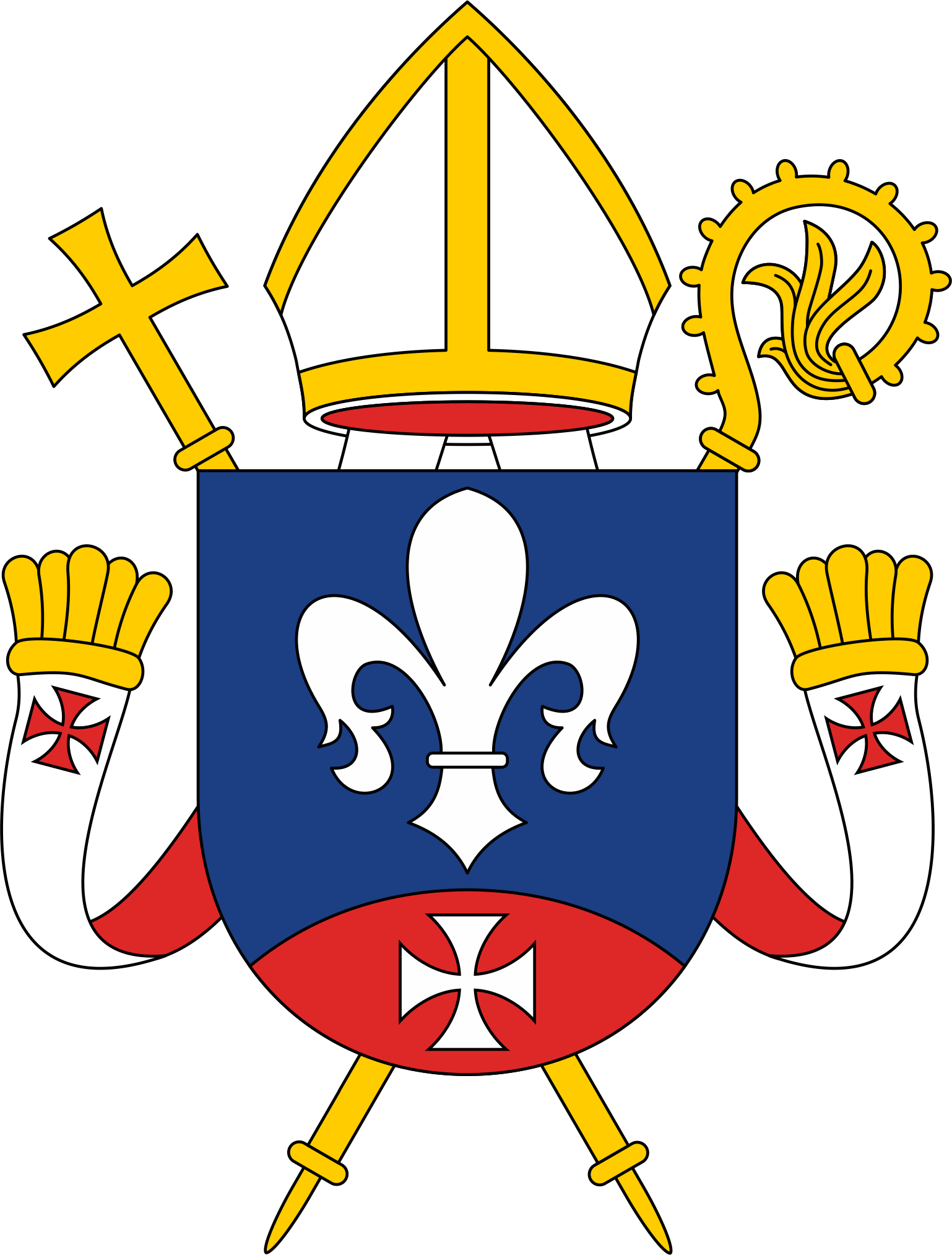
- Coat of arms

Location
- Country: Iceland
- Territory: Iceland
- Ecclesiastical province: Immediately subject to the Holy See

Statistics
- Area: 103,000 km^{2} (40,000 sq mi)
- Population: Total; Catholics: (as of 2022); ▲376,248; ▲14,723 (▲3.9%)
- Parishes: 9
- Churches: 18

Information
- Denomination: Catholic
- Sui iuris church: Latin Church
- Rite: Roman Rite
- Established: 18 October 1968
- Cathedral: Cathedral Basilica of Christ the King
- Patron saint: Saint Thorlak
- Secular priests: 6

Current leadership
- Pope: Leo XIV
- Bishop: Dávid Bartimej Tencer
- Vicar General: Damian Wyżkiewicz

Website
- catholica.is

The Diocese of Reykjavík (Latin: Dioecesis Reykiavikensis) is a Latin Church diocese of the Catholic Church which covers the whole of the country of Iceland, and numbered 14,723 Catholics as of 2022. It is directly subject to the Holy See.

== History ==
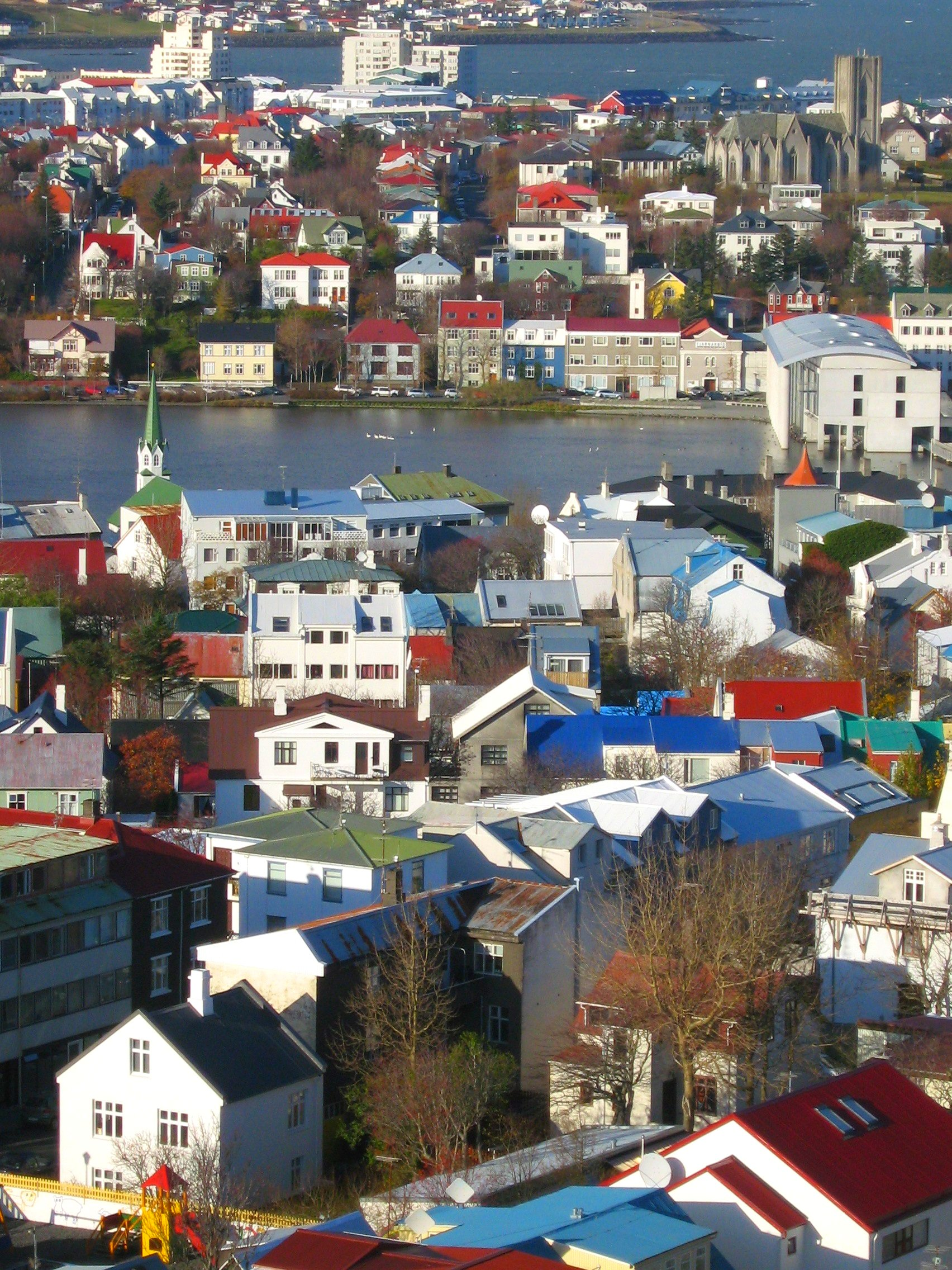
The Cathedral of Christ the King in the upper right.

The Apostolic Prefecture of Iceland was created in 1923 and this was elevated to an Apostolic Administration in 1929, which in turn was elevated to the status of a diocese in 1968. In 2015 the then bishop, Pierre Bürcher retired and Father Dávid Bartimej Tencer, OFM Cap., was appointed to succeed him as the fifth bishop of the diocese. The bishop of Reykjavík participates in the Scandinavian Bishops Conference. The vicar general is Fr. Patrick Breen, rector of Landakot Cathedral, Christ the King Parish.

The Diocese of Reykjavík is a modern creation. The medieval church was represented by the sees of Skálholt (created 1056) and Hólar (1106), but these became Lutheran during the Reformation. (These two sees were amalgamated in 1801 into a single diocese under the Bishop of Iceland in the Lutheran Church of Iceland.) Iceland remained without Roman Catholic prelates until the Apostolic Prefecture was established at Reykjavík in 1923.

== Episcopal ordinaries ==
The following most recent heads of the Catholic Church in Iceland were bishops:

Vicars Apostolic of Iceland
No.	Bishop	Term	Appointor	Coat of arms
1	Martin Meulenberg	1923 - 1941	Pope Pius XI	
2	Jóhannes Gunnarsson	1924 - 1967	Pope Pius XII	

Bishops of Reykjavík
No.	Bishop	Term	Appointor	Coat of arms
1	Hendrik Hubert Frehen	1968 - 1986	Pope Paul VI	
2	Alfred Jolson	1987 - 1994	John Paul II	
3	Joannes Gijsen	1996 - 2007	John Paul II	
4	Pierre Bürcher	2007 - 2015	Benedict XVI	
5	Dávid Bartimej Tencer	2015-	Pope Francis	

== See also ==
- Bishop of Reykjavík (Catholic)
- Christ the King Cathedral, Reykjavík (Iceland)
- Catholic Church in Iceland
- Religion in Iceland
- St. Thorlak Church, Reyðarfjörður
