= Joannes Gijsen =

Dutch Roman Catholic bishop (1932–2013)

His Excellency Joannes Baptist Matthijs Gijsen
- Bishop of Reykjavík
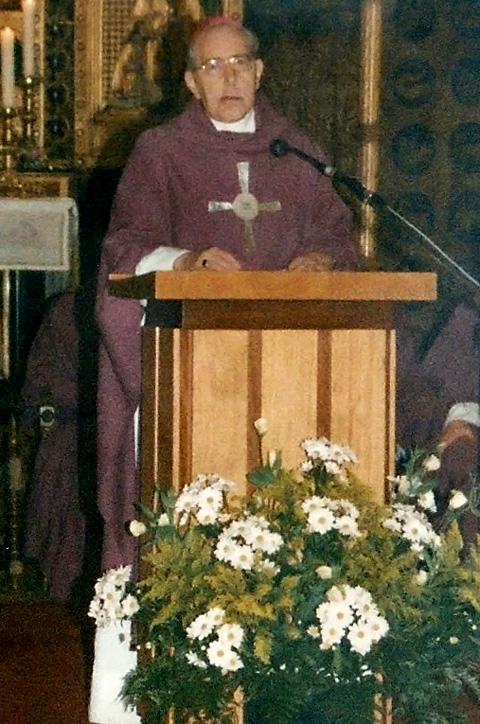
- Bishop Gijsen in 2010
- Church: Roman Catholic Church
- Diocese: Diocese of Roermond; Diocese of Reykjavík
- In office: Roermond: January 20, 1972 – January 23, 1993; Reykjavík: May 24, 1996 – October 30, 2007
- Predecessor: Roermond: Petrus Moors; Reykjavík: Alfred Jolson (S.J.)
- Successor: Roermond: Frans Wiertz; Reykjavík: Pierre Bürcher

Personal details
- Born: October 7, 1932 Oeffelt, Netherlands
- Died: June 24, 2013 (aged 80) Sittard, Netherlands
- Coat of arms

Joannes Baptist Matthijs Gijsen (October 7, 1932 – June 24, 2013) was a Dutch bishop of the Roman Catholic Church. After being Bishop (emeritus) of Roermond, Limburg, the Netherlands, he became Bishop (emeritus) of the Diocese of Reykjavík (Iceland). His episcopal motto was Parate viam Domini (Prepare the way of the Lord).

== Early life and priesthood ==
Gijsen was born in Oeffelt. He would be ordained a priest on April 6, 1957. He obtained a doctorate (Ph.D.) in Church History, focusing his thesis on Joannes Augustinus Paredis. During the National Pastoral Council in Noordwijkerhout from 1966 until 1970, Gijsen was one of the opponents to the direction the council was taking. The council was choosing for a more liberal interpretation on the documents promulgated by the Second Vatican Council, in particular the interpretation of Lumen Gentium. This was in contradiction to the view held by the pope. Many view his stance on the council of Noordwijkerhout as one of the reasons, if not the reason Gijsen would later be appointed bishop of Roermond.

== Episcopate in Roermond, the Netherlands ==
Pope Paul VI appointed Gijsen as bishop of Roermond on February 13, 1972, with co-consecrator being Bernardus Johannes Alfrink. The reaction to his appointment was one of outrage. The liberal Dutch Catholics of the episcopacy were heartbroken, a pain which was broadcast in the media. Among his soon-to-be colleagues, he was an unknown factor. Cardinal Alfrink even went to Rome to contest the appointment, but instead was told he had to co-consecrate Gijsen. This increased the outrage the laity was expressing over his appointment, as this was seen as a way to force the cardinals hand. This would increase the divide between the Dutch laity and the Catholic hierarchy. During his episcopacy, Gijsen would try as much as he could to overturn the changes made at Noordwijkerhout. In 1993 he resigned for health reasons. During this sickness he was the titular bishop of Maastricht.

== Episcopate in Reykjavik, Iceland ==
After a few years at the titular see as bishop of Maastricht, (Traiectum ad Mosam), Gijsen's health improved. In Roermond, he had already been succeeded by bishop Frans Wiertz but in Reykjavik, the diocese with few priests for an large area, had been vacant for two years, due to the rather sudden death of the American bishop, Alfred Jolson.

Bishop Gijsen was then appointed to Reykjavík, where the Catholic population is small but rising due to immigration. Gijsen remained bishop in Iceland for another ten years. On October 30, 2007, Pope Benedict XVI accepted the resignation from the pastoral government of the Diocese of Reykjavík, presented by Joannes Gijsen, in accordance with canon 401 § 1 of the 1983 Code of Canon Law. Since then the bishop lived in Sittard (Limburg) as Chaplain of the Carmelite Sisters. In Reykjavik, he was succeeded by the Swiss-born bishop Pierre Bürcher. Bishop Gijsen was awarded the White Falcon decoration by the Icelandic government. He was also an ecclesiastical Knight Grand Cross of the Sacred Constantinian Order of Saint George.

== Death ==
Gijsen died in Sittard on 24 June 2013, aged 80. He died two months after another Dutch bishop, Muskens.

In 2014 two complaints against Gijsen for sexual abuse dating from the period 1958–1961 were deemed valid by the complaints commission of the Catholic Church. The declaration that complaints could be valid was unprecedented against a Dutch bishop. Gijsen's successor in the diocese of Roermond, Frans Wiertz, apologized for Gijsen's behaviour.
