= St. Thorlak Church =

- Kirkja St. Þorlák
- St. Þorlákskirkja in Reyðarfjörður
- St. Thorlak Church
- 65.037886°N 14.231973°W
- Location: Reyðarfjörður
- Country: Iceland
- Denomination: Roman Catholic Church

The St. Thorlak Church (Icelandic: Kirkja St. Þorlák) is a Catholic church in Kapúsínaklaustrið á Kollaleiru, in the town of Reyðarfjörður, Austurland, Iceland. The church is in the Diocese of Reykjavík.

== History ==
The wooden bones of the church were built in Slovakia, then disassembled and shipped to Iceland. Local bishop (also from Slovakia) called for the help of volunteers in Hriňová. The church was built and then assembled in Reyðarfjörður by the help of volunteers and their donations of the material as well. Slovaks, Poles and others working in Iceland volunteered their weekends to construct the church in place.

== Namesake ==
The church was dedicated to Þorlákur Þórhallsson (anglicized as Thorlak Thorhallsson), known in the church as Saint Thorlak. He was an Icelandic Catholic religious who founded the first Augustinian monastery in Iceland. His relics in the church of Skálholt were looted during the Protestant Reformation. His status as the patron saint of Iceland was recognized by Pope John Paul II in 1984, almost 800 years after his death.

== See also ==
- Catholic Church in Iceland
