= Jóhannes Gunnarsson =

Icelandic prelate (1897-1972)

His Excellency Jóhannes Gunnarsson S.M.M.
- Vicar Apostolic of Iceland; Titular Bishop of Hólar
- Church: Roman Catholic
- Appointed: 23 February 1942
- In office: 1943-1967
- Predecessor: Martino Meulenberg
- Successor: Hendrik Hubert Frehen

Orders
- Ordination: 14 June 1924
- Consecration: 7 July 1943 by Amleto Giovanni Cicognani

Personal details
- Born: 3 August 1897 Reykjavík, Iceland
- Died: 17 June 1972 (aged 74)

Styles of Jóhannes Gunnarsson
- Reference style: The Right Reverend
- Spoken style: Your Excellency
- Religious style: Bishop
- Posthumous style: none

Jóhannes Gunnarsson, SMM (3 August 1897—17 June 1972) was an Icelandic prelate of the Roman Catholic Church.

Jóhannes was born in Reykjavík. His grandfather was a leader in the Althing, and his father converted to Roman Catholicism while attending school in Denmark; he was Iceland's only native Catholic for 20 years. He did his early studies under the Icelandic Jesuits, then in Denmark, and later studied theology in the Netherlands. He was ordained as a priest of the Missionaries of the Company of Mary on 14 June 1924 and, upon his return to Reykjavík, commenced his priestly ministry at the Cathedral.

On 23 February 1943 Jóhannes was appointed Apostolic Vicar of Iceland and titular bishop of Hólar by Pope Pius XI. He received his episcopal consecration on the following 7 July at St. Patrick's Catholic Church in Washington, D.C. He was enthroned as apostolic vicar after returning to Iceland, where he was the first native bishop in nearly four centuries; the last was Jón Arason, who was beheaded with his two sons by King Christian III in 1550. At the time of his consecration, there were only three parishes and four hundred Catholics in his country, which is predominantly of the Lutheran persuasion.

Jóhannes attended the Second Vatican Council from 1962 to 1965, and resigned his post in 1967, after 25 years of service, before dying at the age of 74.

Preceded by Martino Meulenberg, SMM	Apostolic Vicar of Iceland; 1942–1967	Succeeded by Hendrik Frehen, SMM
