= Catholic Church in Iceland =

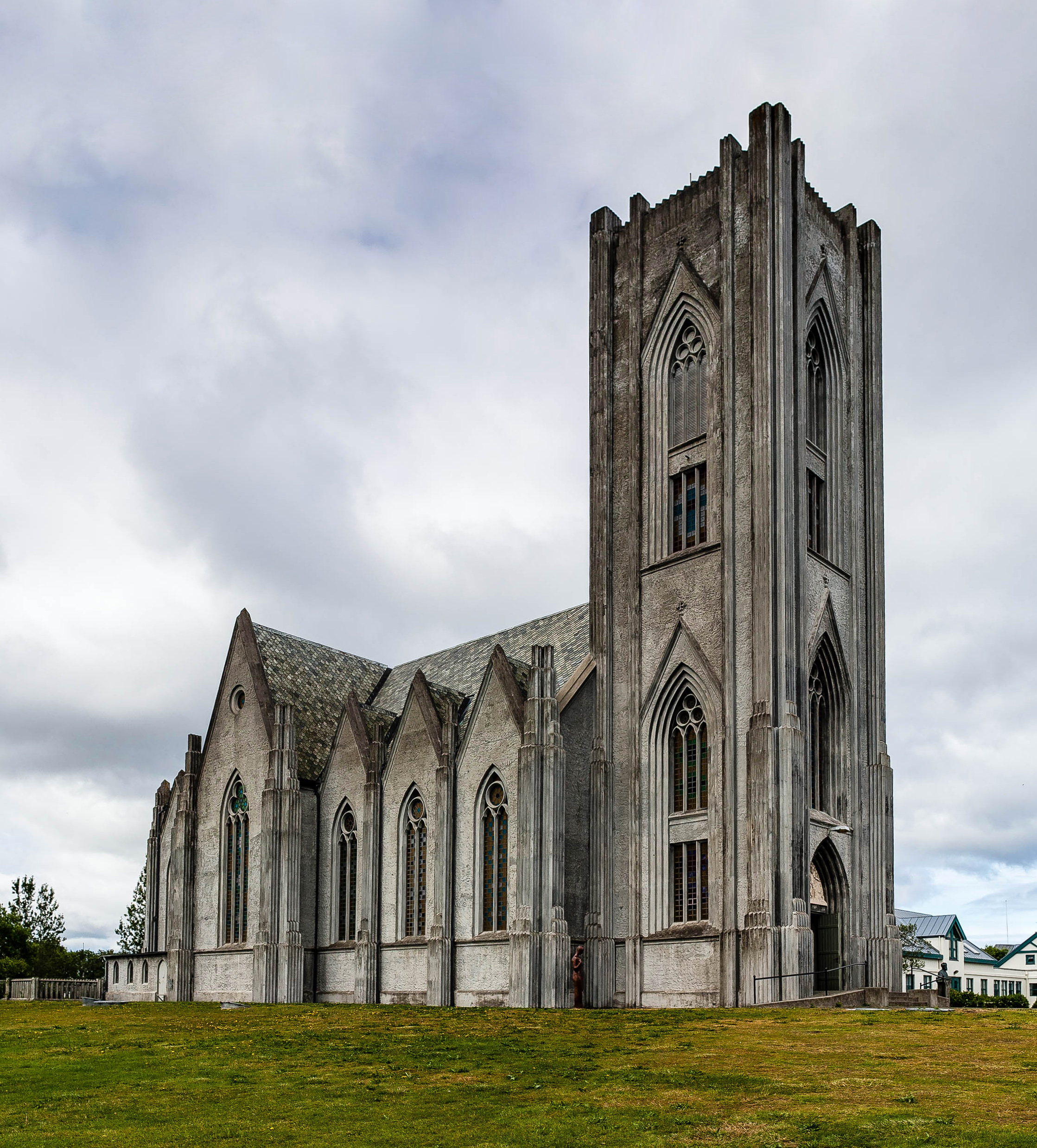
The Cathedral of Christ the King in Reykjavík, Iceland

The Catholic Church in Iceland (Icelandic: Kaþólska kirkjan á Íslandi) is part of the Catholic Church, under the spiritual leadership of the Pope. The island is served by a single diocese, the Diocese of Reykjavík, having a total of seven parishes. As of 2015, the ordinary is bishop Dávid Bartimej Tencer. The diocese is directly subject to the Holy See. Besides that there is one parish of Ukrainian Greek Catholic church under the jurisdiction of Apostolic Exarchate of Germany and Scandinavia.

== Statistics ==
As of 2022, there are 14,723 Catholics in Iceland, with 6 diocesan priests, 9 religious order priests, and 38 sisters in religious orders. Catholics represent 3.91% of the Icelandic population and are growing in number rapidly, due in large part to Polish immigration to Iceland. In an interview with Catholic foundation Aid to the Church in Need, Bishop David Tencer said he believes the real number of Catholics could be closer to 50,000. The Diocese of Reykjavík covers the whole of Iceland. The diocese has a cathedral, Christ the King Cathedral (Dómkirkja Krists Konungs) in Reykjavík, and a number of smaller churches and chapels in the larger towns around the country.

== History ==
=== Pre-Reformation ===
Some of the earliest inhabitants of Iceland were Irish monks, known as Papar. However, the small population was overwhelmed in the eighth and ninth centuries by migrations of Scandinavians, most of whom practised what can loosely be called Germanic paganism. Particularly through the influence of continental missionaries and pressure from the Norwegian king, Iceland officially converted in 999/1000 AD, but the Christianisation of Iceland, as with the rest of Scandinavia, was a long process, beginning before official conversion and continuing after it.

Before the Reformation, there were two dioceses in Iceland, the Diocese of Skálholt (first bishop, Ísleifur Gissurarson, 1056), and the Diocese of Hólar (first bishop, Bl. Jón Ögmundsson, 1106).

=== Reformation ===
During the Protestant Reformation, Iceland adopted Lutheranism in place of Catholicism. Two men, Oddur Gottskálksson and Gissur Einarsson, became disciples of Martin Luther and soon secured followers, particularly after King Christian III of Denmark and Norway declared himself for Lutheranism and began to enforce the change in his kingdom. This led to resistance and civil war on the island. Jón Arason and Ögmundur Pálsson, the Catholic bishops of Skálholt and Hólar respectively, opposed the king's efforts at promoting the Reformation in Iceland. Pálsson was deported by Danish officials in 1541, but Arason decided to fight. Opposition to the Reformation effectively ended in 1550 when Arason was captured after being defeated in the Battle of Sauðafell by royalist forces under Daði Guðmundsson. Arason and his two sons were subsequently beheaded in Skálholt on 7 November 1550.

As a consequence, Catholicism was outlawed and church property was appropriated by Iceland's rulers. Latin remained the official language of the Lutheran Church of Iceland until 1686. While a good part of Catholic terminology and other externals were retained, Lutheran teachings differed considerably from Catholic doctrine. Those Catholics who refused to convert were forced into exile. Most chose Scotland as their place of exile. Catholic clergy were outlawed in Iceland for more than three centuries.

=== Revival ===
Number of Catholics in Iceland over time

The Catholic Church established on 8 December 1855 a jurisdiction under the name Apostolic Prefecture of the North Pole (Praefectura Apostolica Poli Arctici) that included Iceland. Several years later, the two French priests Bernard Bernard (1821–1895) and Jean-Baptiste Baudoin (1831–1875) settled in Iceland in 1857 and 1858 respectively. They met with a difficult reception and in 1862, Bernard left the country, while Baudoin persevered until 1875. On 17 August 1869 Pope Pius IX set up an Apostolic Prefecture of Denmark, which now included Iceland. Freedom of worship was enacted in 1874. After an interval, Catholic missionary efforts were resumed, with by the turn of the century a church, a school and even a hospital run by nuns.

The former jurisdiction became an Apostolic Vicariate of Denmark on 15 March 1892. Thereafter, the island territory became for the Catholic Church an independent unit, first as the Apostolic Prefecture of Iceland on 23 June 1923 and then, not many years later, on 6 June 1929, as the Apostolic Vicariate of Iceland. It was on 18 October 1968 that this entity matured into the Diocese of Reykjavík. Although Catholics remained a small minority of Iceland's population, their numbers increased from approximately 443 in 1950 to 5,582 in 2004, while Iceland's total population grew from around 140,000 to 290,490.

In the twentieth century Iceland had some notable, if at times temporary, converts to the Catholic faith. For a time Halldór Laxness was a Catholic. Although this did not last, his Catholic period is of importance due to his position in modern Icelandic literature. A more consistently Catholic writer in Icelandic was Jón Sveinsson. He moved to France at the age of 13 and became a Jesuit. He remained in the Society of Jesus for the rest of his life. He was well liked as a children's book author (though he did not write in Icelandic) and he even appeared on an Icelandic postage stamp. In 1989, Pope John Paul II visited Iceland.

Today, the number of Catholics in Iceland, a predominantly Protestant country, comprises just under 3.81% of the population, and form the second largest denomination in the country. The Diocese of Reykjavík covers the whole of Iceland. There is a Christ the King Cathedral (Dómkirkja Krists Konungs) in Reykjavík and a number of smaller churches and chapels in the larger towns. The Bishop of Reykjavík participates in the Scandinavian Bishops Conference. Many of the Catholics are immigrants from Central Europe, Lithuania, the Philippines and South America; if they are excluded, Catholics are about 1% of the population, the figure before immigrants started coming in large numbers.

On 17 June 2017 a new Catholic Church was consecrated in Reyðarfjörður in a ceremony led by Bishop Tencer. The church building was a gift from the Slovak Catholic Church. The church was built from wood in Slovakia, disassembled and shipped to Reyðarfjörður where it was re-assembled. Robert Fico, the Prime Minister of Slovakia, attended the consecration.

Despite its small size, bishop David Tencer says that the Icelandic church is "the most dynamic in Europe", citing numbers: "In 2023, we had 150 baptisms, 200 confirmations and only 14 funerals."

== See also ==
- Ancient Diocese of the Faroe Islands
- Bishop of Orkney
- Bishop of Reykjavík (Catholic)
- Garðar, Greenland (list of Bishops of Garðar)
- Christ the King Cathedral (Reykjavík)
- List of Hólar bishops
- List of Skálholt bishops
- Religion in Iceland
