= Dávid Bartimej Tencer =

Slovak prelate (born 1963)

His Excellency, The Most Reverend Dávid Bartimej Tencer O.F.M. Cap.
- Bishop of Reykjavík
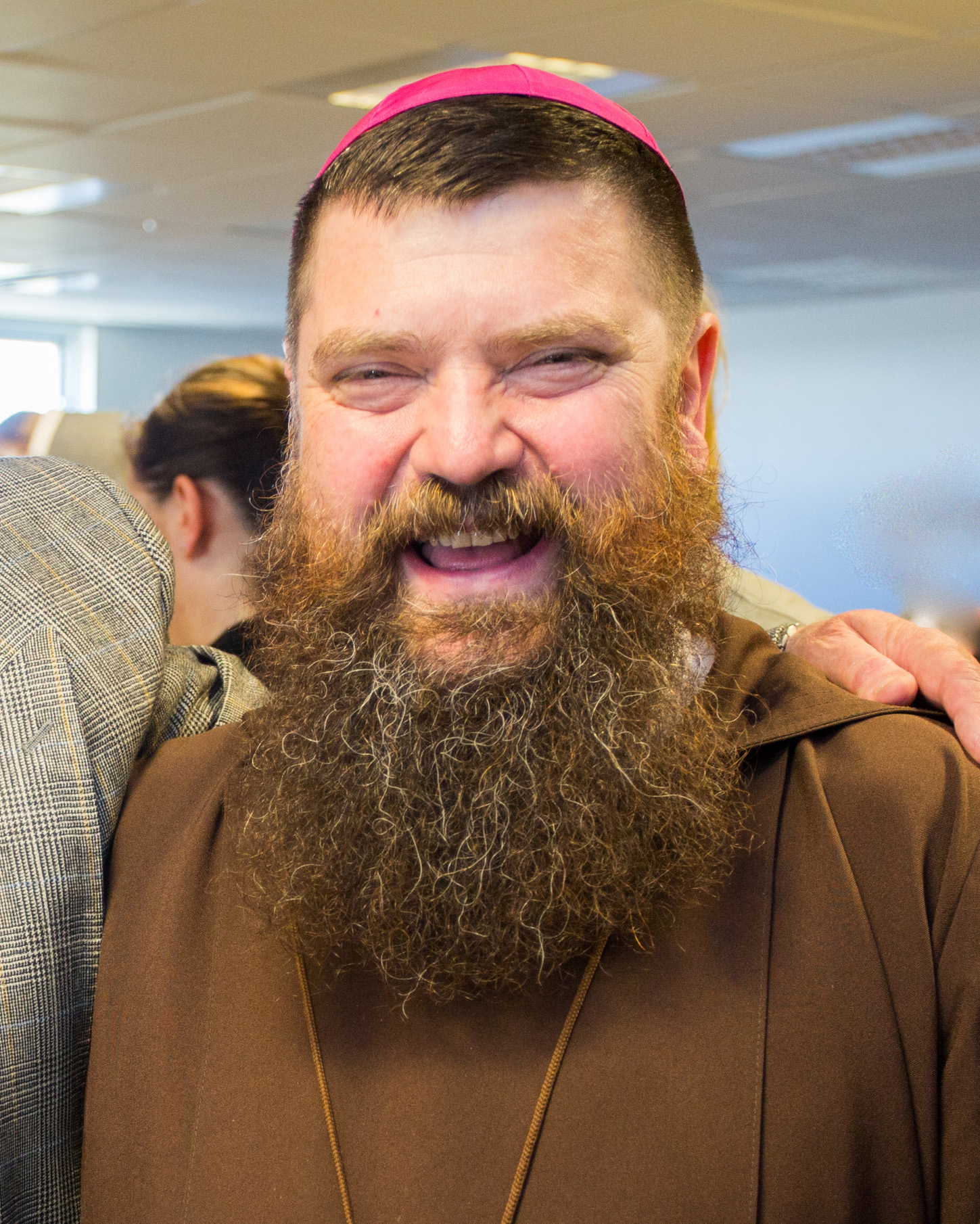
- Tencer in 2019
- Church: Roman Catholic Church
- Diocese: Reykjavík
- See: Reykjavík
- Appointed: 18 September 2015
- Installed: 31 October 2015
- Predecessor: Pierre Bürcher

Orders
- Ordination: 15 June 1986
- Consecration: 31 October 2015 by Pierre Bürcher

Personal details
- Born: Dávid Bartimej Tencer; 18 May 1963 (age 63) Nová Baňa, Czechoslovakia (now Slovakia)
- Denomination: Roman Catholicism
- Motto: Gaudium et spes (Joy and Hope)

Styles of Dávid Bartimej Tencer
- Reference style: His Excellency; The Most Reverend
- Spoken style: Your Excellency
- Religious style: Bishop

Dávid Bartimej Tencer OFM Cap. (Slovak: [ˈdaːʋid ˈbarcimej ˈtentser]; also written as Davíð Tencer Icelandic: [ˈtaːʋiːð ˈparˌtʰɪmɛj ˈtʰɛnsɛr]; born 18 May 1963) is a Slovak prelate of the Catholic Church and has served as the Bishop of Reykjavík since 2015.

== Early life and priesthood ==
Tencer was born on 18 May 1963 in Nová Baňa, Czechoslovakia (modern-day Slovakia). On 15 June 1986, Dávid Tencer received the sacrament of priestly ordination for the Diocese of Banská Bystrica. In 1990, Tencer entered into the Order of the Capuchins, and on 28 August 1994 he made his perpetual profession. He then served as a parish administrator in Holíč. In 1996, he was transferred to Raticov vrch at Hriňova. Between 2001 and 2004, he taught homiletics and spiritual theology in the seminary in Badin. As the superior of the fraternity in Žilina from 2003 until 2004 he was teaching spiritual theology in the Institute of Saint Thomas of Aquin in Žilina.

He came to Iceland in 2004 and was appointed parish priest at the Stella Maris Parish in Reykjavik. In 2007, he was made parish priest of the St. Thorlak Church in Reyðarfjörður, He also served on the Presbyteral Council and on the Diocese's Collegium Consultorum.

== Episcopate ==
On 18 September 2015, Pope Francis appointed him bishop of Reykjavík. On 31 October 2015 his predecessor, Pierre Bürcher, ordained him bishop in Reykjavík. His co-consecrators were the apostolic nuncio in Iceland, archbishop Henryk Józef Nowacki, and the bishop of Žilina, Tomáš Galis.

On 17 June 2017 a new Catholic Church was consecrated in Reyðarfjördur in a ceremony led by Tencer. The church building was a gift from the Slovak Catholic Church. The church was built from wood in Slovakia, disassembled and shipped to Reyðarfjördur where it was re-assembled. Robert Fico, the Prime Minister of Slovakia, attended the consecration.

In an interview with pontifical charity Aid to the Church in Need, bishop David Tencer spoke about his ministry in Iceland, saying "the Sicilians will hug you just because you are wearing a Capuchin habit, here they ask me if I am a Buddhist monk or a Muslim. I learned three songs in my first three hours in Albania. In my first three years here, I didn’t learn any”, but adding that the more reserved spirit of the Icelandic population "isn't better or worse, it’s just different. And it is necessary to survive" the harsh climate. He described the motto of his work in the country as "Loving our glacial land".
