= Religion in Iceland =

Religious affiliation in Iceland (2026)
1. Church of Iceland (Lutheran) (56.3%)
2. Free Lutheran Church in Reykjavík (2.52%)
3. Free Lutheran Church in Hafnarfjörður (2.01%)
4. Independent Lutheran Congregation (0.74%)
5. Catholic Church (3.95%)
6. Other Christian denominations (1.72%)
7. Humanism (1.62%)
8. Ásatrúarfélagið (1.56%)
9. Islam (0.54%)
10. Buddhism (0.41%)
11. Other and unspecified (21.0%)
12. Unaffiliated (7.67%)

Religion in Iceland has been predominantly Christianity since its adoption as the state religion by the Althing under the influence of Olaf Tryggvason, the king of Norway, in 999/1000 CE. Until then, in the 9th and 10th centuries, the prevailing religion among the early Icelanders — who were mostly Norwegian settlers fleeing Harald Fairhair's monarchical centralisation in 872–930, with some Swedes and Norse British settlers — was the northern Germanic religion, which persisted for centuries even after the official Christianisation of the state.

Starting in the 1530s, Iceland, originally Roman Catholic and under the Danish crown, formally switched to Lutheranism with the Icelandic Reformation, which culminated in 1550. The Lutheran Church of Iceland has since then remained the country's state church. Freedom of religion has been granted to Icelandic citizens since 1874; the Church of Iceland is supported by the government, but all religions officially recognised in the state's civil registry receive support from a church tax (sóknargjald) owed by their respective populations of adherents over the age of sixteen, who are counted by the state's statistical office on a yearly basis; citizens who declare that they are not affiliated with any religion owe an equivalent tax to the University of Iceland.

Since the late 20th century, and especially in the early 21st century, religious life in Iceland has become more diverse, with a decline in the main forms of Christianity, the rise of unaffiliated people, and the emergence of new religions, notably Germanic Heathenism (or Heathenry; Germanic Neopaganism) in Iceland also called Ásatrú, which seeks to reconstruct the Germanic folk religion; a secular grouping of Humanism; Buddhism; Islam; Mesopotamian Zuism (Mesopotamian Neopaganism); and others.

As of 2026, Christians constituted 67.24% of the Icelandic population, a marked decline from the 97.8% observed in 1990 according to Statistics Iceland. Within the Christian category, 56.3% identified as Lutherans belonging to the Church of Iceland. This is a significant decrease from the 92.6% who identified this way in 1990. Other minor Lutheran free churches accounted for 5.27%, Roman Catholicism for 3.95%, and other Christian denominations for 1.72%. The Roman Catholic community has grown from 0.9% in 1990, and other Christian denominations saw growth mainly between 1990 and the 2010s, stabilizing thereafter.

The data for 2026 also indicate an increase in non-Christian religious affiliations and in those who identify as non-religious. Heathenry, a polytheistic religion native to Iceland, accounted for 1.56% of the population. Humanists made up 1.62%, Buddhists 0.41%, and Muslims 0.53%.

A growing segment of the population—20.69% as of 2026 (combined with 0.27% who believe in minor religions in the pie chart)—adheres to religions, philosophies, or life stances not recognized in the civil registry, or did not declare any religious affiliation. This category has seen a substantial increase from 0.6% in 1990 and has tripled from 6.2% in 2010. Meanwhile, the percentage of Icelanders who declared themselves explicitly unaffiliated with any religion, philosophy, or life stance was 7.67% in 2026, up from 1.3% in 1990.

== Demographics ==
1990–2025 quinquennial statistics for major religions and philosophies yielded by Statistics Iceland
Religion	1990		1995		2000		2005		2010		2015		2020		2025	
Religion	Number	%	Number	%	Number	%	Number	%	Number	%	Number	%	Number	%	Number	%
Christianity	250,501	97.9%	260,311	97.2%	268,642	95.0%	277,863	92.8%	284,146	89.5%	276,649	83.2%	273,321	75.1%	265,325	68.13%
└ Church of Iceland (Note: Since 1550, the state church of Iceland is the Evangelical Lutheran Church (Evangelíska lúterska kirkja), a Christian denomination, also known simply as the Church of Iceland or the National Church (Þjóðkirkjan).)	236,959	92.6%	245,049	91.5%	248,411	87.8%	251,728	84.0%	251,487	79.1%	237,938	71.5%	231,112	63.47%	222,888	57.23%
└ Other non-Catholic Christians	11,146	4.3%	12,709	4.7%	15,924	5.6%	19,684	6.6%	22,987	7.2%	26,297	7.9%	27,577	7.57%	27,303	7.01%
└ Catholic Church	2,396	0.9%	2,553	0.95%	4,307	1.5%	6,451	2.15%	9,672	3.0%	12,414	3.7%	14,632	4.02%	15,134	3.89%
Heathenry	98	0.03%	190	0.07%	512	0.2%	953	0.3%	1,422	0.4%	3,210	1.0%	4,764	1.31%	6,062	1.56%
Humanism	–	–	–	–	–	–	–	–	–	–	1,456	0.4%	3,507	0.96%	6,101	1.57%
Buddhism	–	–	230	0.08%	466	0.2%	685	0.2%	1,090	0.3%	1,336	0.4%	1,495	0.42%	1,642	0.42%
Islam	–	–	–	–	164	0.05%	341	0.1%	591	0.2%	865	0.3%	1,281	0.35%	1,317	0.34%
Zuism	–	–	–	–	–	–	–	–	–	–	3,087	1.0%	1,213	0.33%	391	0.10%
Baháʼí Faith	378	0.1%	402	0.15%	386	0.1%	389	0.1%	398	0.1%	365	0.1%	353	0.1%	323	0.08%
Other and unspecified (Note: The category "other and unspecified" comprises citizens who declared to be affiliated with religions which are not recognised in the civil registry, or who did not declare either affiliation or unaffiliation with any religion.)	1,505	0.6%	2,753	1.0%	6,325	2.2%	11,794	3.9%	19,647	6.2%	26,359	7.9%	52,086	14.3%	77,058	19.79%
Unaffiliated (Note: The category of the "unaffiliated" comprises citizens who declared that they are not affiliated with any religion.)	3,373	1.3%	3,923	1.4%	6,350	2.2%	7,379	2.5%	10,336	3.2%	19,202	5.7%	26,114	7.17%	30,190	7.75%
Population	255,855	100%	267,809	100%	282,845	100%	299,404	100%	317,630	100%	332,529	100%	364,134	100%	389,444	100%

Membership of religious and philosophical organisations in 2026
Organisation	Religion	Members	%
Church of Iceland (Þjóðkirkjan)	Christianity	222,012	56.30
Free Church in Reykjavík (Fríkirkjan í Reykjavík)	Christianity	9,938	2.52
Independent Congregation (Óháði söfnuðurinn)	Christianity	2,932	0.74
Free Church in Hafnarfjörður (Fríkirkjan í Hafnarfirði)	Christianity	7,919	2.01
Catholic Church (Kaþólska kirkjan)	Christianity	15,558	3.95
Seventh-day Adventist Church in Iceland (Kirkja sjöunda dags aðventista á Íslandi)	Christianity	541	0.14
Pentecostal Church in Iceland (Hvítasunnukirkjan á Íslandi)	Christianity	2,028	0.51
Congregation of Sjónarhæð (Sjónarhæðarsöfnuðurinn)	Christianity	34	0.01
Jehovah's Witnesses (Vottar Jehóva)	Christianity	507	0.13
Baháʼí Community (Baháʼí samfélagið)	Baháʼí Faith	291	0.07
Asatruar Fellowship (Ásatrúarfélagið)	Heathenry	6,158	1.56
Church of Smárinn (Smárakirkja)	Christianity	330	0.08
The Church of Jesus Christ of Latter-day Saints (Kirkja Jesú Krists hinna síðari daga heilögu)	Christianity	117	0.03
The Way Church for You (Vegurinn kirkja fyrir þig)	Christianity	398	0.10
Buddhist Fellowship of Iceland (Búddistafélag Íslands)	Buddhism	1,025	0.26
Free Church of Kefas (Fríkirkjan Kefas)	Christianity	81	0.02
First Baptist Church (Fyrsta baptistakirkjan)	Christianity	57	0.01
Fellowship of Muslims in Iceland (Félag múslima á Íslandi)	Islam	569	0.14
Icelandic Church of Christ (Íslenska Kristskirkjan)	Christianity	217	0.06
Church of the Annunciation (Boðunarkirkjan)	Christianity	116	0.03
Fellowship of Believers (Samfélag trúaðra)	Christianity	22	0.01
Zen in Iceland (Zen á Íslandi)	Buddhism	207	0.05
Christian Community of Betania (Betanía kristið samfélag)	Christianity	131	0.03
Russian Orthodox Church (Rússneska rétttrúnaðarkirkjan)	Christianity	780	0.20
Serbian Orthodox Church (Serbneska rétttrúnaðarkirkjan)	Christianity	473	0.12
World Peace Association of Families (Heimsfriðarsamtök fjölskyldna)	Christianity	23	0.01
Godword of Reykjavík (Reykjavíkurgoðorð)	Heathenry	32	0.01
Home Church (Heimakirkja)	Christianity	49	0.01
SGI in Iceland (SGI á Íslandi)	Buddhism	147	0.04
Church of the Resurrected Life (Kirkja hins upprisna lífs)	Christianity	15	0.00
Church of God Ministry of Jesus Christ International (Alþjóðleg kirkja Guðs og embætti Jesú Krists)	Christianity	178	0.05
Catch the Fire (Catch the Fire)	Christianity	176	0.04
House of Prayer (Bænahúsið)	Christianity	25	0.01
Baptist Church of the Emmanuel (Loftstofan baptistakirkjan)	Christianity	119	0.03
Faith Fellowship of the Salvation Army (Hjálpræðisherinn trúfélag)	Christianity	256	0.06
Iceland Christian Nation (Ísland kristin þjóð)	Christianity	24	0.01
Faith Fellowship of Zuism (Zuism trúfélag)	Zuism; Mesopotamian Neopaganism	0	0.00
Icelandic Ethical Humanist Association (Siðmennt félag siðrænna húmanista á Íslandi)	Secular humanism	6,387	1.62
Reborn Christian Church of God (Endurfædd kristin kirkja af Guði)	Christianity	33	0.01
New Avalon Centre (Nýja Avalon miðstöðin)	Theosophy	14	0.00
DíaMat	Dialectical materialism	237	0.06
Tibetan Buddhist Fellowship (Félag Tíbet búddista)	Buddhism	49	0.01
Organisation of Muslims in Iceland (Stofnun múslima á Íslandi)	Islam	870	0.22
Diamond Way Buddhism (Demantsleið búddismans)	Buddhism	32	0.01
Vitund (Vitund)	Spirituality	2	0.00
Ashutosh Yoga in Iceland (Ashutosh jóga á Íslandi)	Hinduism	65	0.02
Ethiopian Orthodox Tewahedo Church in Iceland (Eþíópíska Tewahedo rétttrúnaðarkirkjan á Íslandi)	Christianity	26	0.01
ICCI (ICCI)	Islam	690	0.17
Cultural Fellowship of Jews in Iceland (Menningarfélag Gyðinga á Íslandi)	Judaism	76	0.02
Wat Phra Dhammakaya Buddhist Association in Iceland (Wat Phra Dhammakaya búddistasamtökin á Íslandi)	Buddhism	203	0.05
Theosophical Society of Iceland (Lífspekifélag Íslands)	Theosophy	133	0.03
Ahmadiyya (Samfélag Ahmadiyya-múslima á Íslandi)	Islam	10	0.00
Parish of saint Bartholomew (Söfnuður heilags Bartelómeusar)	Christianity	14	0.00
ISKCON (ISKCON, krishnasamfélag)	Hinduism	148	0.04
Other religions and unspecified	Various	81,593	20.69
Unaffiliated	Unknown	30,257	7.67
Population		394,324	100.00

== History ==
=== 9th–10th century: early Germanic settlement ===
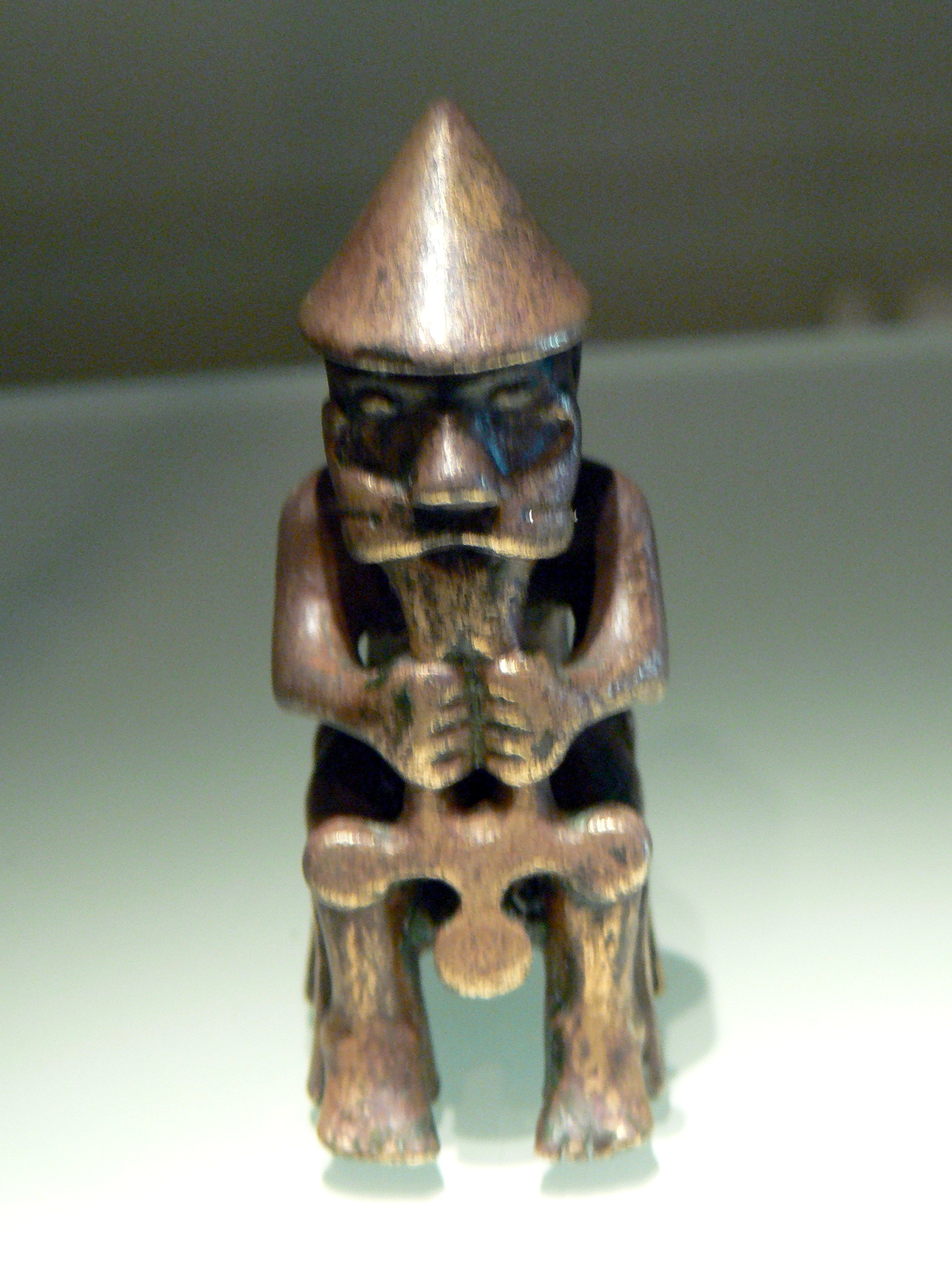
Statue representing the god Thor, c. 1000, National Museum of Iceland.

When Iceland was first settled by Norwegians (but also by some Swedes and people from the Norse settlements in Britain) in the mid-9th century, approximately in 870, it was inhabited by a small number of Irish Christian anchorites known as papar (singular papi). When Scandinavians began to arrive in larger numbers, the anchorites left of their own or were driven out. The migration of Norwegians was partly in response to the politics of Harald Fairhair, who was unifying Norway under a centralised monarchy.

The first Icelanders, though accustomed to a society in which the monarch was essential for religious life, did not establish a new monarchy in the colony, but rather a yearly assembly of free men, the Althing. The "things" were assemblies of free men who governed Germanic societies, and they were led by a holy kingship. The Icelandic thing developed peculiar characteristics; in place of the loyalty to a holy king, the Icelanders established the loyalty to a law code, first composed by Úlfljót who studied Norwegian laws.

Icelandic landowners (landnámsmenn) were organised into goðorð ("god-word(s)"), religio-political groups under the leadership of a goði ("god-man"). The goðar were part-time priests who officiated ritual sacrifices at the local temple and had some qualities of the Germanic kings; they organised local things and represented them at the Althing. Úlfljót was chosen as the first lawspeaker (lögsögumaðr), who presided the Althing which met annually at Thingvellir. The religio-political organisation of early Iceland has been defined as "pagan and anti-monarchic", which distinguished it from other Germanic societies. Concerning other religious practices, the Icelanders followed Scandinavian norms; they built temples enshrining images of the gods.

The religion was named Goðatrú or Ásatrú, "truth of the gods (the Ases)". The Icelanders worshipped landvættir, local land spirits, and the gods of the common northern Germanic tradition, within hof and hörgar. Different social orders worshipped different divine representations: the class of poets worshipped the supreme Odin, as highlighted by the poems of Hallfreðr Óttarsson, in the Landnámabók and in the Eyrbyggja saga; among the general population, the most worshipped deity was apparently Thor, whom the Icelanders worshipped as represented by high pillars; while the class of farmers worshipped Frey, as attested in the Víga-Glúms saga.

=== 10th–11th century: Christianisation ===
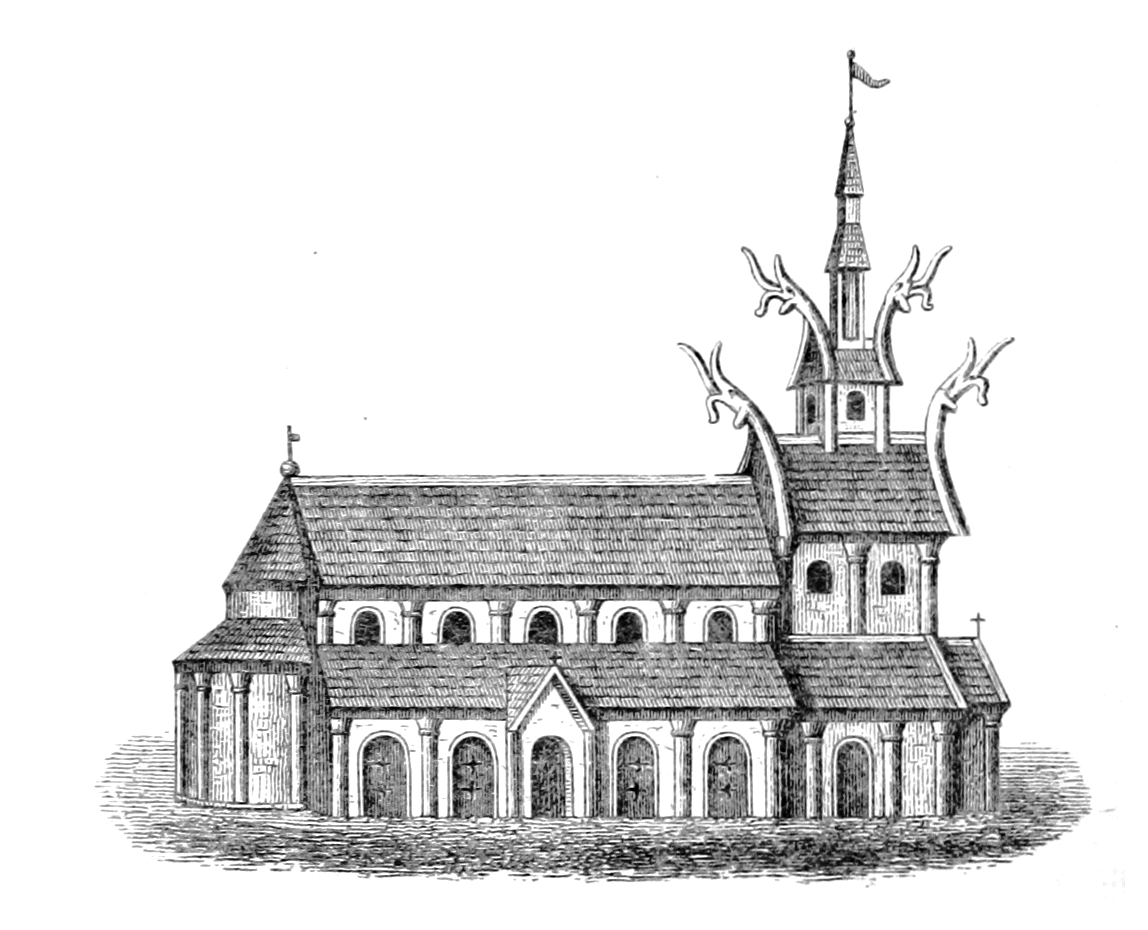
Early Icelandic churches maintained the style of Heathen hofs, often featuring dragon finials on the roof, such as in the case of the old church of Thingvellir (the current one goes back to 1859, while the steeple was rebuilt in 1907), built by initiative of King Olaf of Norway, who provided timber and the bell, to mark the official Christianisation of Iceland in the year 1000.

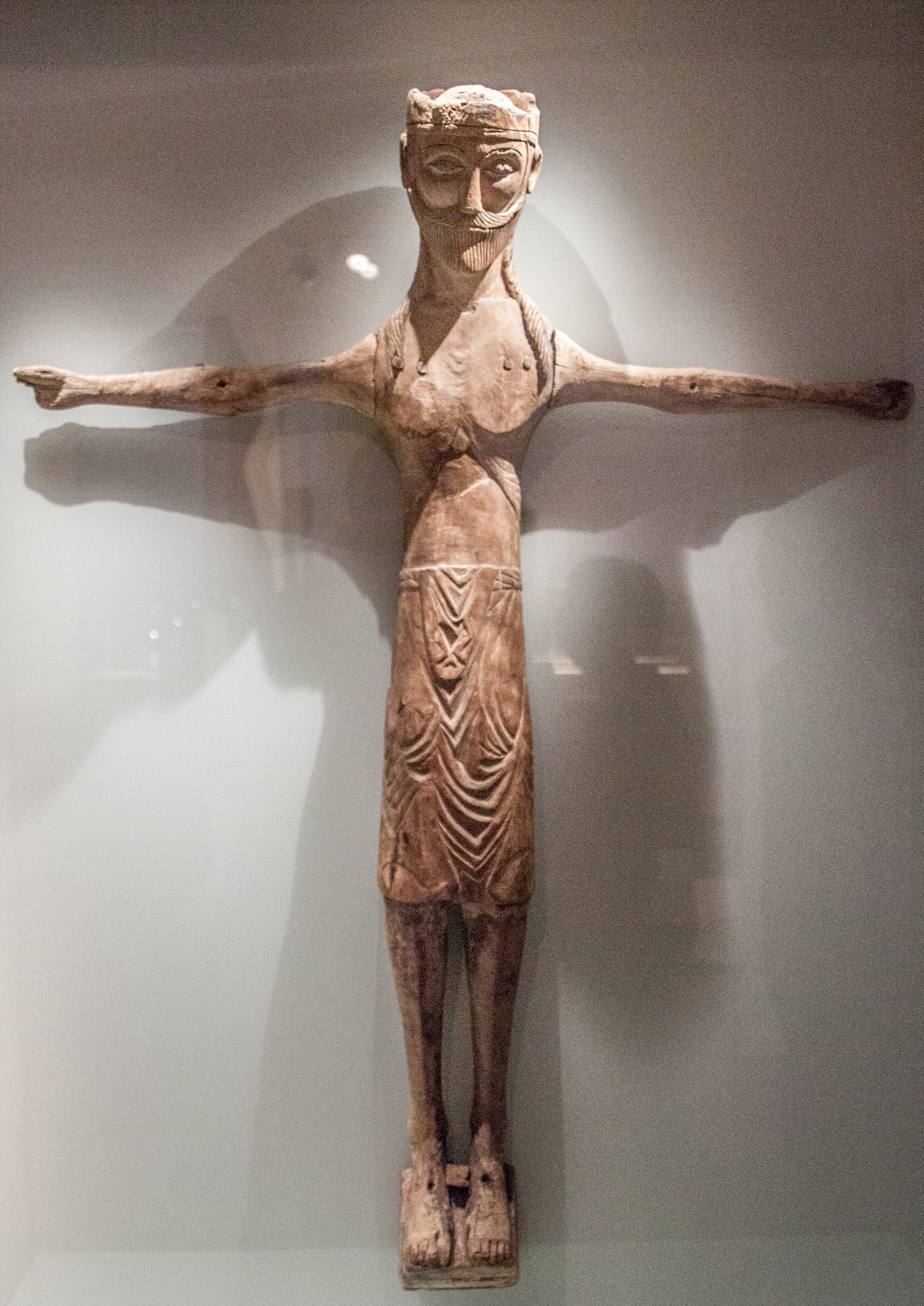
Carved statue of Jesus Christ, c. 1200, National Museum of Iceland.

Apart from the Irish papar, Christianity had been present in Iceland from the beginning even among the Germanic settlers. The Landnámabók gives the names of Christian settlers, including an influential woman named Aud the Deep-Minded. Icelanders generally tended to syncretism, integrating Jesus Christ among their deities rather than converting to the Christian doctrine. For instance, Aud the Deep-Minded was amongst the baptised and devout Christians and she established a Christian cross on a hill, where she prayed; her kinsmen later regarded the site as holy, and built an Ásatrú temple there. These first Christians were probably influenced by contact with Norse people in Britain, where Christianity already had a strong presence. Among the first settlers, the vast majority followed the ancient Germanic religion, and organised Christianity probably died out in one or two generations. The syncretic attitude of the Icelanders made possible for the Germanic religion to survive and intermingle with Christianity even in later periods: it is recorded in the Eyrbyggja saga that as Norway was being Christianised, a pagan temple was dismantled there to be reassembled in Iceland.

The adoption of Christianity — which at that time was still identical to the Roman Catholic Church and its official doctrine — as the state religion (kristnitaka, literally the "taking of Christianity"), and therefore the formal conversion of the entire population, was decided by the Althing in 999/1000, pushed by the king of Norway, Olaf Tryggvason. In that year, Christianity was still a minority in Iceland, while the belief in the Germanic religion was strong. Nonetheless, some Christians had acquired high positions in the goðorð system and therefore considerable power in the Althing.

Christian missionaries began to be active in Iceland by 980. One of them was the Icelandic native Thorvald Kodransson, who had been baptised on the continent by the Saxon bishop Fridrek, with whom he preached the gospel in Iceland in 981, converting only Thorvald's father Kodran and his family. They were unsuccessful and even had a clash with pagans at the Althing, killing two men. After the event, in 986 Fridrek returned to Saxony while Thorvald embarked for Viking expeditions to Eastern Europe. Amongst the other proselytisers, King Olaf of Norway sent the Icelandic native Stefnir Thorgilsson in 995–996 and the Saxon priest Thangbrand in 997–999. Both the missions were unsuccessful: Stefnir violently destroyed temples and ancestral shrines, leading the Althing to enact a law against Christians — who were declared frændaskomm, a "disgrace on one's kin", and could now be denounced to authorities — and to outlaw Stefnir, who returned to Norway; Thangbrand, a learnt but violent man, succeeded in converting some important families, but he also met many opponents, and, when he killed a poet who had composed verses against him, he was outlawed and he too went back to Norway.

At this point, Olaf Tryggvason suspended Iceland's trade with Norway, which resulted in a concrete danger for Icelandic economy, and also threatened to execute Icelanders residing in Norway, who were for the most part sons and relatives of prominent goðar, as long as Iceland remained a pagan country. Iceland sent a delegation, belonging to the Christian faction, to obtain the release of the hostages and promise the conversion of the country to Christianity. Meanwhile, in Iceland the situation was worsening, as the two religious factions had divided the country and a civil war was about to break out. However, the mediation of the Althing, presided by the lawspeaker Thorgeir Thorkelsson, thwarted the conflict. Thorgeir was trusted by both the religious factions, and he was given the responsibility to decide whether the Icelanders would have converted to Christianity or would have remained faithful to the Germanic religion of their ancestors. After one day and one night, he decided that, in order to keep peace, the population would be united under one law and one religion, Christianity, and all the non-Christians among the population would receive baptism. At first, it was maintained the right for people to sacrifice to the old gods in the private of their homes, although the practice was punishable if witnesses were provided. A few years later, these provisions allowing private cults were abolished.

The decision of the Althing was a turning point; theretofore, it was difficult for individuals to convert to Christianity, since it would have meant to abandon the traditions of one's own kin, and would have been seen as ættarspillar — that is to say, "destruction of kinship". However, despite the official Christianisation, the old Germanic religion persisted for long time, as it is proven by the literature produced by Snorri Sturluson — he himself a Christian — and by other authors in the 13th century, who wrote the Prose Edda and the Poetic Edda. After the conversion of the country, members of the goðorð often became Christian priests and bishops. The first consecrated bishop in Iceland was Ísleif Gizursson, who was the bishop of Skálholt from 1057 to his death in 1080. He is credited with having instituted a tithe system (sóknargjald) which made the Icelandic church financially independent and strengthened Christianity.

=== 16th century: Protestant Reformation ===
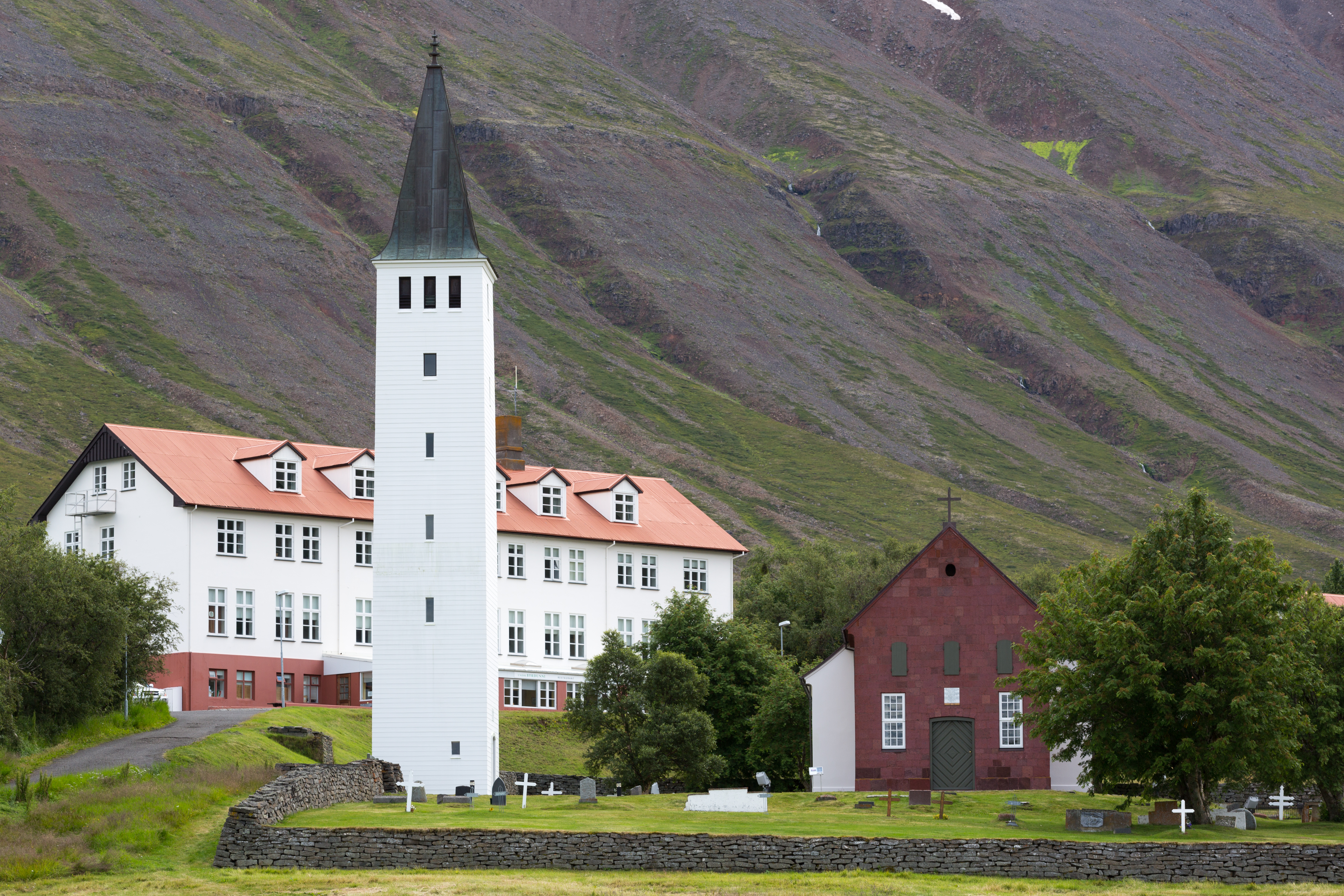
The Lutheran Cathedral of Hólar, and Hólar University College.

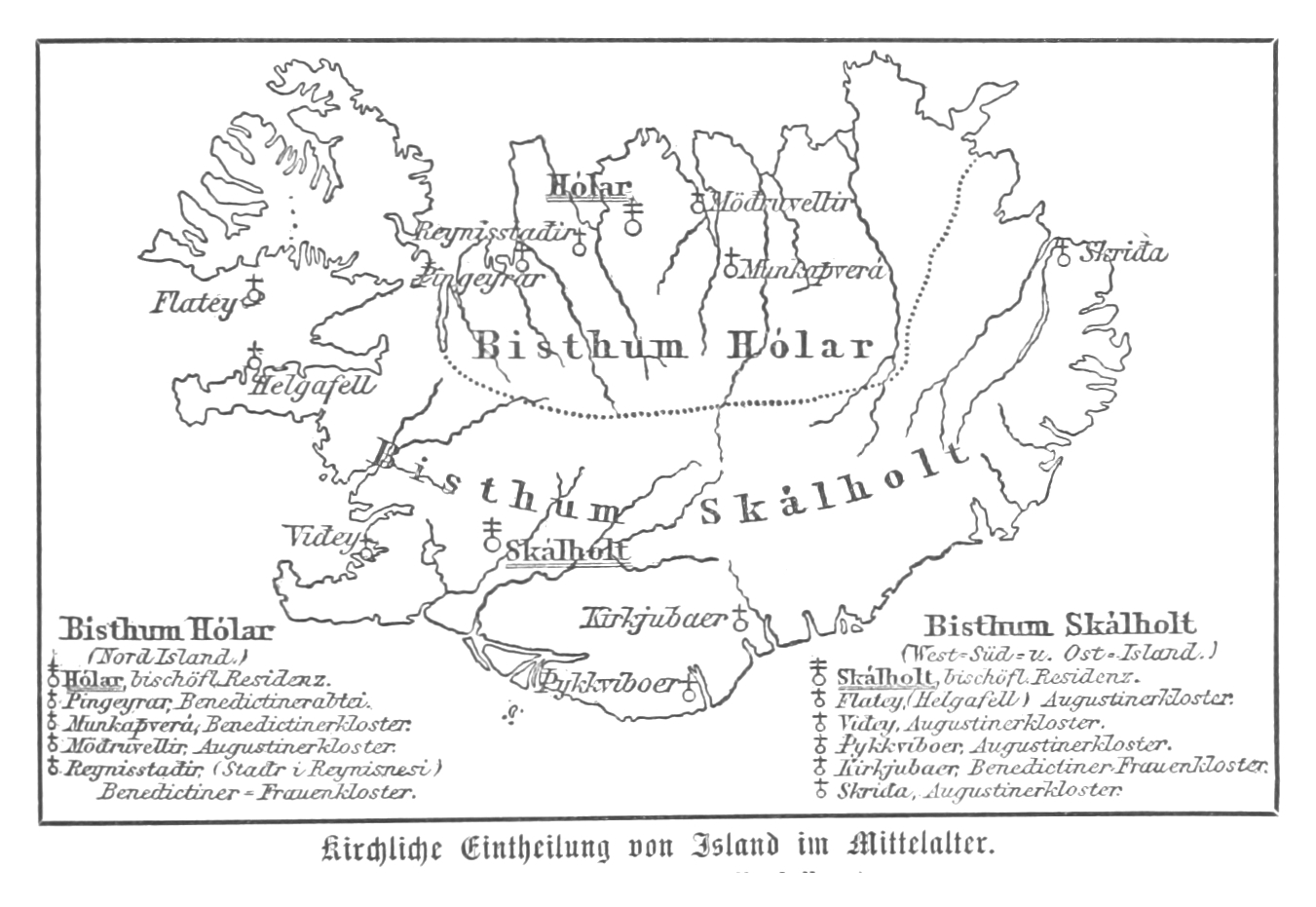
1889 map showing the location in Iceland of the two major Catholic bishoprics, and of the Catholic monasteries under their jurisdiction, before the Protestant Reformation.

The last two Catholic bishops of Iceland were Øgmundur Pállson of Skálholt and Jón Arason of Hólar. Jón was a poet of some importance and was married with many children, a usual thing among the clergy in Iceland. The two bishops, who were not well versed in theology but were men of great power, were in conflict with one another and threatened open conflict. At the Althing of 1526 they came with their own armed contingents, although they reconciled because of the threat posed by a new, common enemy, the spread of Lutheranism.

Lutheran pamphlets were introduced in Iceland through trade with Germany. In 1533, the Althing bade that "all shall continue in the Holy Faith and the Law of God, which God has given to us, and which the Holy Fathers have confirmed". One of the first Icelandic Lutherans was Oddur Gottskálksson, who had converted to Lutheranism while living in continental Europe for many years. When he went back to Iceland, he became the secretary of the bishop of Skálholt and translated the New Testament into the Icelandic language.

The most important figure in early Icelandic Lutheranism was, however, Gissur Einarsson, who during a period of study in Germany learnt about the Reformation. In 1536, he became assistant at the Skálholt bishopric, though he did not formally embrace Lutheranism yet. When Lutheranism became the state religion of Denmark and Norway under King Christian III, the king tried to convert Iceland too. In 1538, the "Church Ordinance" was put before the two bishops Øgmundur and Jón at the Althing as a royal invitation to convert to Lutheranism, but it was rejected. Thereupon, Christian III ordered the dissolution of the monasteries in Iceland. Bishop Øgmundur, now old and almost blind, chose Gissur Einarsson as his successor. He was examined by theologians in Copenhagen and in 1540 the king appointed him as the superintendent of Skálholt. Gissur was only 25 years old and it was difficult for him to maintain power, especially as he was opposed by the clergy and even by the old bishop. A royal emissary was sent to uphold the ordinance, and Øgmundur was arrested and died on the way to Denmark. The ordinance was accepted in Skálholt, but was rejected by Jón Arason in Hólar. Bishop Gissur, who was ordained by the Danish bishop Peder Palladius, reorganised the church in his diocese according to Lutheran principles, including the suppression of Catholic ceremonies and the exhortation of priests to get married. He entrusted Oddur Gottskálksson with the task of translating German sermons, and he himself translated parts of the Old Testament and the Church Ordinance.

Gissur Einarsson died in 1548, and thereupon Jón Arason took possession of the Skálholt diocese, even though the clergy opposed him. He also imprisoned Gissur's appointed successor. Jón Arason was consequently outlawed by the king; he was arrested together with two of his sons, and all three were executed in November 1550. In 1552, the Hólar diocese too accepted the Church Ordinance. Institutional opposition to the Reformation had now vanished completely, so that church properties were secularised and churches and monasteries were plundered. However, it took many decades for Lutheranism to become firmly established in Iceland. Church manuals and hymnals were in bad Danish translations, and new schools had to be set up in cathedral towns in order to train the Lutheran clergy. The Danish bishop Palladius was in charge of the development of the Icelandic Lutheran church in those early years. The able and energetic Gudbrandur Thorláksson, bishop of Hólar from 1571 to 1627, devoted his energies in improving church literature, clergy training and community education. In 1584, the first complete Icelandic translation of the Bible was published.

=== 20th–21st century: decline of Christianity and rise of new religions ===
Membership rise in registered non-Christian religions in Iceland, 1965–2010. Red: Baháʼí Faith; green: Heathenry; dark blue; Buddhism; light blue: Islam.

Logo used by the 2015 board of directors of the Zuist Church.

Since the end of the 19th century, Iceland has been more open to new religious ideas than many other European countries. In the 19th and early 20th centuries, religious life in Iceland, still mostly within the Christian establishment, was influenced by the spread of spiritualist beliefs. Theosophy was introduced in Iceland around 1900, and in 1920 the Icelandic Theosophists formally organised themselves as an independent branch of the international Theosophical movement, though within the fold of the Lutheran belief and led by a Lutheran pastor, Séra Jakob Kristinsson.

Since the late 20th century there has been a rapid diversification of religious life in the country, with the most notable phenomenon being a decline of Christianity (from 97.8% in 1990 to 67.24% in 2026) and a rise of other religions, notably Neopagan religions, especially Germanic Heathenry (Germanic Neopaganism), in Iceland also called Ásatrú, a movement of restoration of the pre-Christian Germanic religion. This may have been assisted by the Icelandic language's literary tradition that predates the island's conversion to Christianity, namely the Eddas and the Sagas, which are well known by most Icelanders and provide an unbroken link with the pagan past. In 1972, four men proposed to create an organisation for the revitalisation of the northern Germanic religion; they founded the Ásatrúarfélagið ("Asatruar Fellowship") and asked the Ministry of Justice and Ecclesiastical Affairs to given their group's high priest the same legal status as that of a Christian pastor. In the autumn of the same year, they asked for their organisation to be recognised by the state, and the registration was completed by the spring of 1973.

In the early 2010s, the Zuism trúfélag ("Faith Fellowship of Zuism") or Zuist Church was founded as an organisation of Mesopotamian Zuism (Mesopotamian Neopaganism), and in 2013 it was recognised by the Icelandic state. In late 2015, the board of directors of the Zuist Church was taken over by people who were unrelated to the movement, and under the new leadership the church was turned into a medium for a protest against the state Lutheran church and the state church tax (sóknargjald): unlike other religious groups, the 2015 board of directors of the Zuist Church promised to redistribute the funds they received from the tax among the church's members, so that about three thousand people joined the group within a few weeks by the end of the year. After a legal struggle, in late 2017 the original founders of the Zuist Church were reinstated as its board of directors, and by the end of the year, after two years of frozen activity, they were allowed to dispose of the church's funds. The 2017 directors kept the principle of funds' redistribution among members, which is called amargi in the Sumerian language. Thereupon, in 2019 they were accused of tax fraud, but were later acquitted of all charges in the spring of 2022.

In 2023 more couples got married in a civil ceremony than in a Church of Iceland one. There were more civil marriages than all religious marriages combined in 2024.

== Religions, philosophies and life stances ==
=== Christianity ===
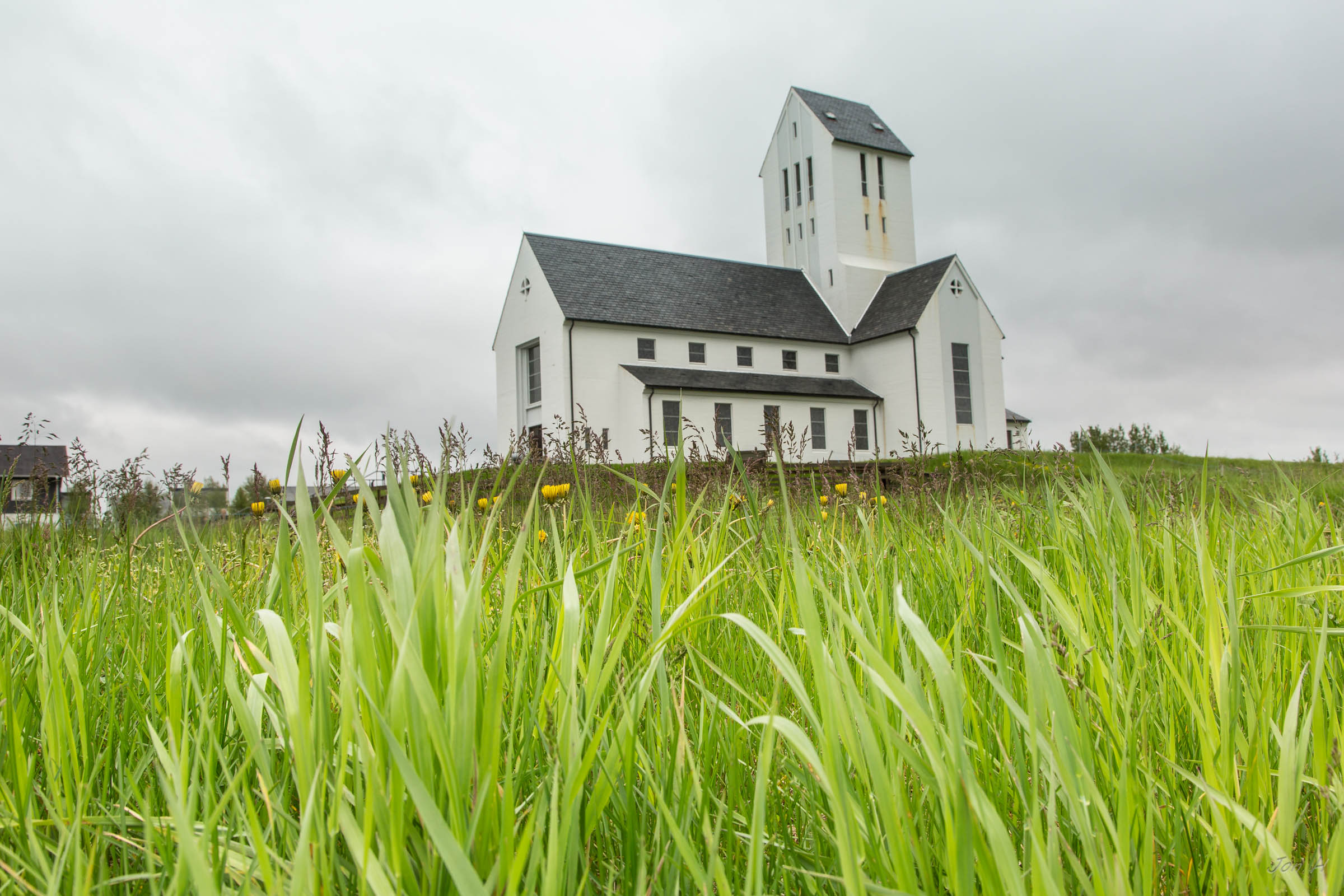
Lutheran Cathedral of Skálholt, the first church which converted to Lutheranism in Iceland.

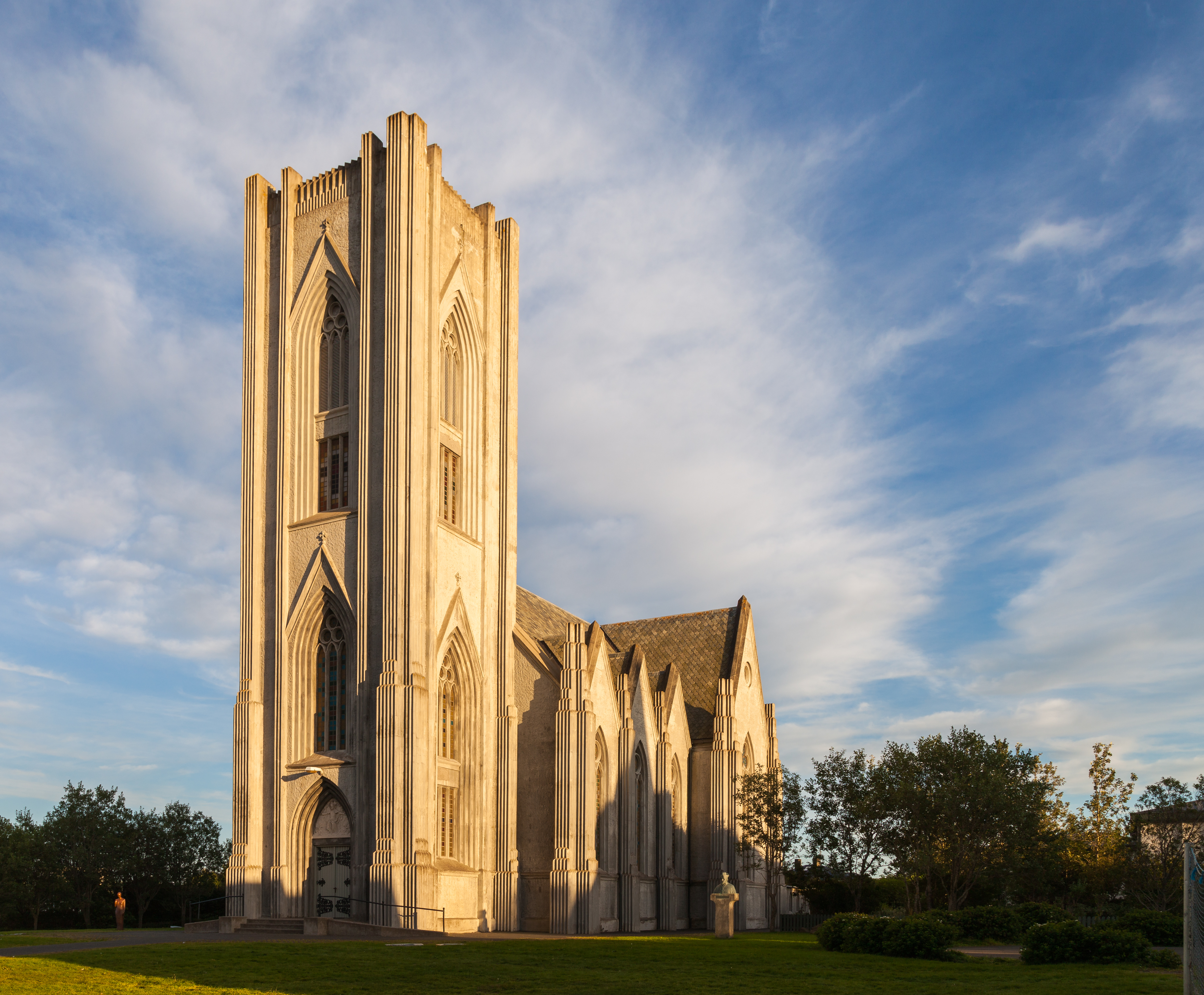
Catholic Cathedral of Christ the King in Reykjavík.

In 2026, according to the official statistics provided by Statistics Iceland, 67.24% of the Icelandic population were Christians, most of them adherents of Lutheranism, belonging to either the Church of Iceland (56.3%) or minor Lutheran free churches, namely the Reykjavík Free Church (2.52%), the Hafnarfjörður Free Church (2.01%) and the Independent Lutheran Congregation (0.74%).

At the same time, Catholicism was the largest non-Lutheran form of Christianity in the country, adhered to by 3.95% of the Icelanders, many of whom belong to the Polish immigrant community; Catholics are organised in the Diocese of Reykjavík, led by the bishop Dávid Bartimej Tencer (1963–) of the Order of Friars Minor Capuchin. In the twentieth century, Iceland had some notable converts to Catholicism, including Halldór Laxness and Jón Sveinsson. The latter moved to France at the age of thirteen and became a Jesuit, remaining in the Society of Jesus for the rest of his life; he became a valued author of books for children, written in German, and even appeared on postage stamps.

A further 1.72% of the population were adherents of other Christian denominations, including Pentecostalism (0.51%), Orthodox Christianity (0.32%), Seventh-day Adventism (0.14%), Baptist Christianity (0.03%), and forms of Restorationism, namely Jehovah's Witnesses (0.13%) and Latter-day Saints Mormonism (0.03%). The Church of Jesus Christ of Latter-day Saints has a meetinghouse in Reykjavík and another in Selfoss; the Reykjavík meetinghouse also hosts a family history center. The first Icelandic Mormon convert and missionary was Gudmund Gudmundson, who converted while staying in Denmark and went back to Iceland to establish the very first Mormon community in the country.

=== Baháʼí Faith ===
The Baháʼí Faith in Iceland was the religion of 0.07% of the population of Iceland in 2026, organised into the Baháʼí Community (Baháʼí samfélagið). The Baháʼí Faith was introduced in 1924 by the American Amelia Collins — who was later recognised as a prominent Baháʼí Hand of the Cause —, and the first Icelander who converted to the religion was a woman named Hólmfríður Árnadóttir. The religion was recognised by the government in 1966, and a Baháʼí National Spiritual Assembly was elected in 1972. Iceland has the highest proportion in Europe of Baháʼí Local Spiritual Assemblies in relation to the total population of the country. The Danish scholar of religion Margit Warburg speculated, while discussing the relatively good establishment of the Baháʼí Faith in Iceland, that the Icelanders are culturally more open than other peoples to religious innovation.

=== Buddhism ===
Buddhism was the religion of about 0.41% of the Icelanders in 2026. Icelandic Buddhists are organised into a number of communities, the largest of which is the non-denominational Buddhist Fellowship of Iceland (Búddistafélag Íslands), followed by Zen Buddhism represented by the community Zen in Iceland (Zen á Íslandi), Nichiren Buddhism represented by the Soka Gakkai International in Iceland (SGI á Íslandi), Theravada Buddhism represented by the Wat Phra Dhammakaya Buddhist Association in Iceland (Wat Phra Dhammakaya búddistasamtökin á Íslandi), and Tibetan Buddhism represented by the Fellowship of Tibetan Buddhists (Félag Tíbet búddista) and by a community of Diamond Way Buddhism (Demantsleið búddismans).

=== Heathenry ===
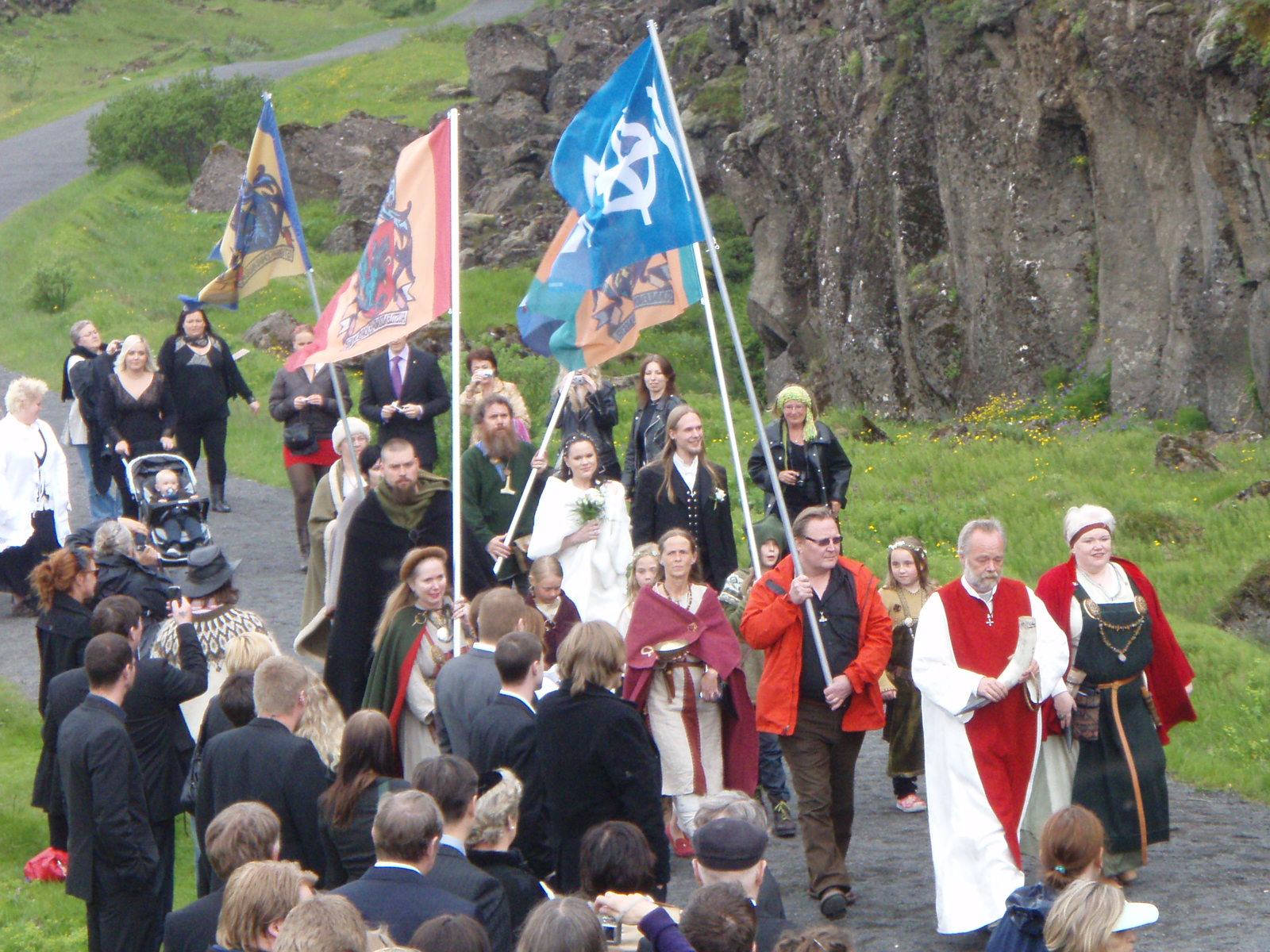
Members of Ásatrúarfélagið, assembling at Þingvellir

From the 1970s there has been a Neopagan rebirth of the northern Germanic religion in Iceland, in the country known as Ásatrú, part of the broader movement of Germanic Heathenry (Germanic Neopaganism). Icelandic Heathens are organised into two communities, namely the Asatruar Fellowship (Ásatrúarfélagið), adhered to by 1.56% of the population in 2026, and the Godword of Reykjavík (Reykjavíkurgoðorð), adhered to by a further 0.01% of the population in the same year. It is the fastest growing religion in Iceland and also the largest non-Christian religion.

=== Hinduism ===
As of 2026, there was a small community of Hindus in Iceland and organised into multiple communities: Ananda Marga (no members in 2026), which was recognised by the state in 2019, and a community of Lakulish Yoga (Lakulish jóga á Íslandi) or Ashutosh Yoga which was recognised in 2020. There are also a Sri Chinmoy centre and other unregistered organisations of meditation and philosophy.

=== Islam ===
Grand Mosque of Iceland, in Reykjavík.

Islam was the religion of a minority representing 0.53% of the Icelandic population in 2026. The number of Icelandic Muslims might actually be larger, since many Muslims choose not to identify themselves in the Icelandic yearly count of religious populations. The Muslim population in Iceland is organised into three communities, namely the Islamic Cultural Centre of Iceland (ICCI), the Fellowship of Muslims in Iceland (Félag múslima á Íslandi) and the Organisation of Muslims in Iceland (Stofnun múslima á Íslandi).

=== Judaism ===
Iceland has a small population of Jews practising Judaism, which was officially recognised by the state in 2021 as incorporated by the Cultural Fellowship of Jews in Iceland (Menningarfélag Gyðinga á Íslandi), representing 0.02% of the population as of 2026. There was no significant Jewish population or emigration to Iceland until the 20th century, although some Jewish merchants lived in Iceland temporarily during the 19th century. The Icelanders' attitude towards the Jews has mostly been neutral, although in the early 20th century the intellectual Steinn Emilsson was influenced by anti-Semitic ideas while studying in Germany. Although most Icelanders deplored the persecutions of Jews during the Second World War, they usually refused entry to Jews who were fleeing Nazi Germany, so the Jewish population did not rise much during the war. The former Icelandic First Lady Dorrit Moussaieff, is a Bukharian Jew and is likely the most significant Jewish woman in Icelandic history.

=== Zuism ===
Zuism (Mesopotamian Neopaganism) is the religion of none of the Icelanders in 2026. It is a Neopagan rebirth of the ancient Mesopotamian religions; the Icelandic Faith Fellowship of Zuism (Zuism trúfélag) was founded around 2010 and officially recognised by the Icelandic state in 2013. The Zuists worship An (the supreme God of Heaven), Ki (the Earth), as well as Enlil (the god of air) and Enki (the god of water), Nanna (the Moon) and Utu (the Sun), Inanna (Venus), Marduk (Jupiter), Nabu (Mercury), Nergal (Mars), Ninurta (Saturn), and Dumuzi.

=== Other beliefs, humanism and unaffiliation ===
According to official statistics yielded by Statistics Iceland, in 2026 a very small minority of the population declared that they adhered to Theosophy, represented by the Theosophical Society of Iceland (Lífspekifélag Íslands) and the New Avalon Centre (Nýja Avalon miðstöðin). Another very small minority is represented by followers of Sikhism, numbering about 40 individuals; the first Akhand Path ceremony — the continued complete recitation of the Guru Granth Sahib — in Iceland was completed in 2013 at the country's small gurudwara.

In 2026, a substantial part of the Icelandic population, that is to say 20.69%, were adherents of unspecified religions, philosophies or life stances not recognised in the Icelandic civil registry or did not declare either affiliation or unaffiliation with any religion, philosophy or life stance. An additional 7.67% of the population were explicitly unaffiliated with any religion, philosophy or life stance. A minority of Icelanders declared an affiliation with secular beliefs, namely, 1.62% declared that they belonged to the Icelandic Ethical Humanist Association (Siðmennt), which represents secular humanism and was officially recognised by the state in 2013, while 0.06% declared that they were affiliated to DíaMat, an organisation of dialectical materialism.

== Gallery ==
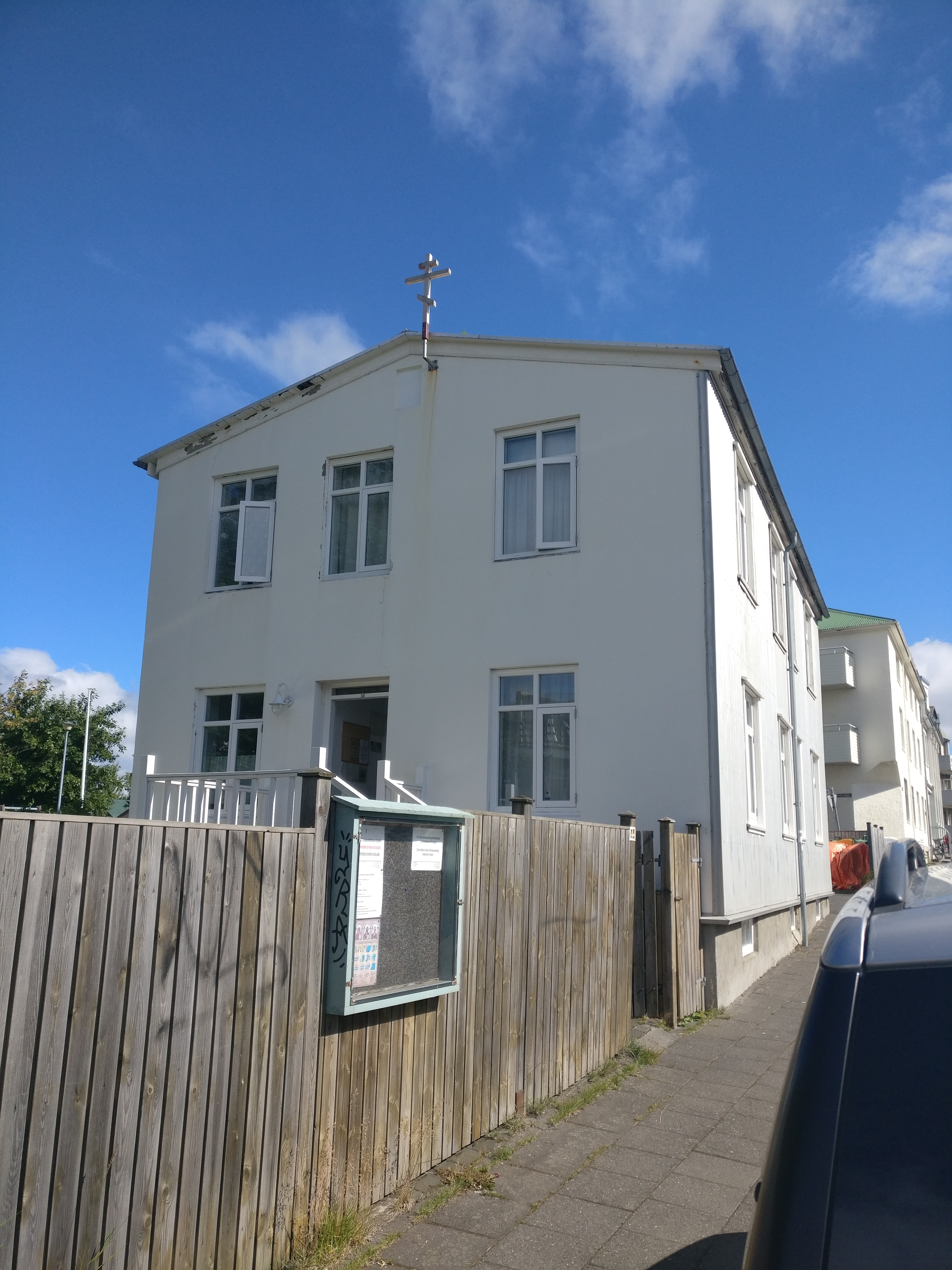
A Russian Orthodox church in Reykjavík.

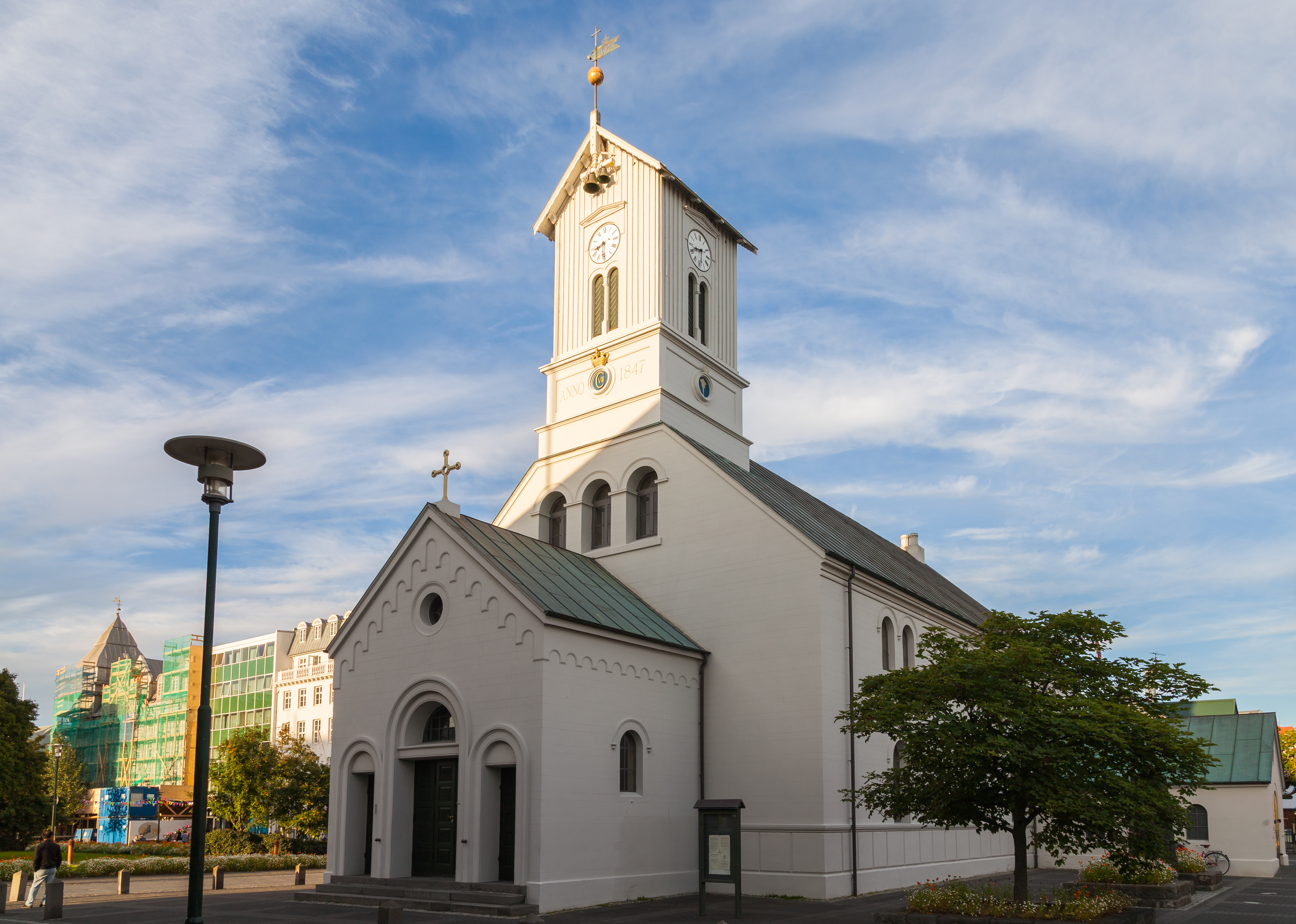
Lutheran cathedral of Reykjavík.

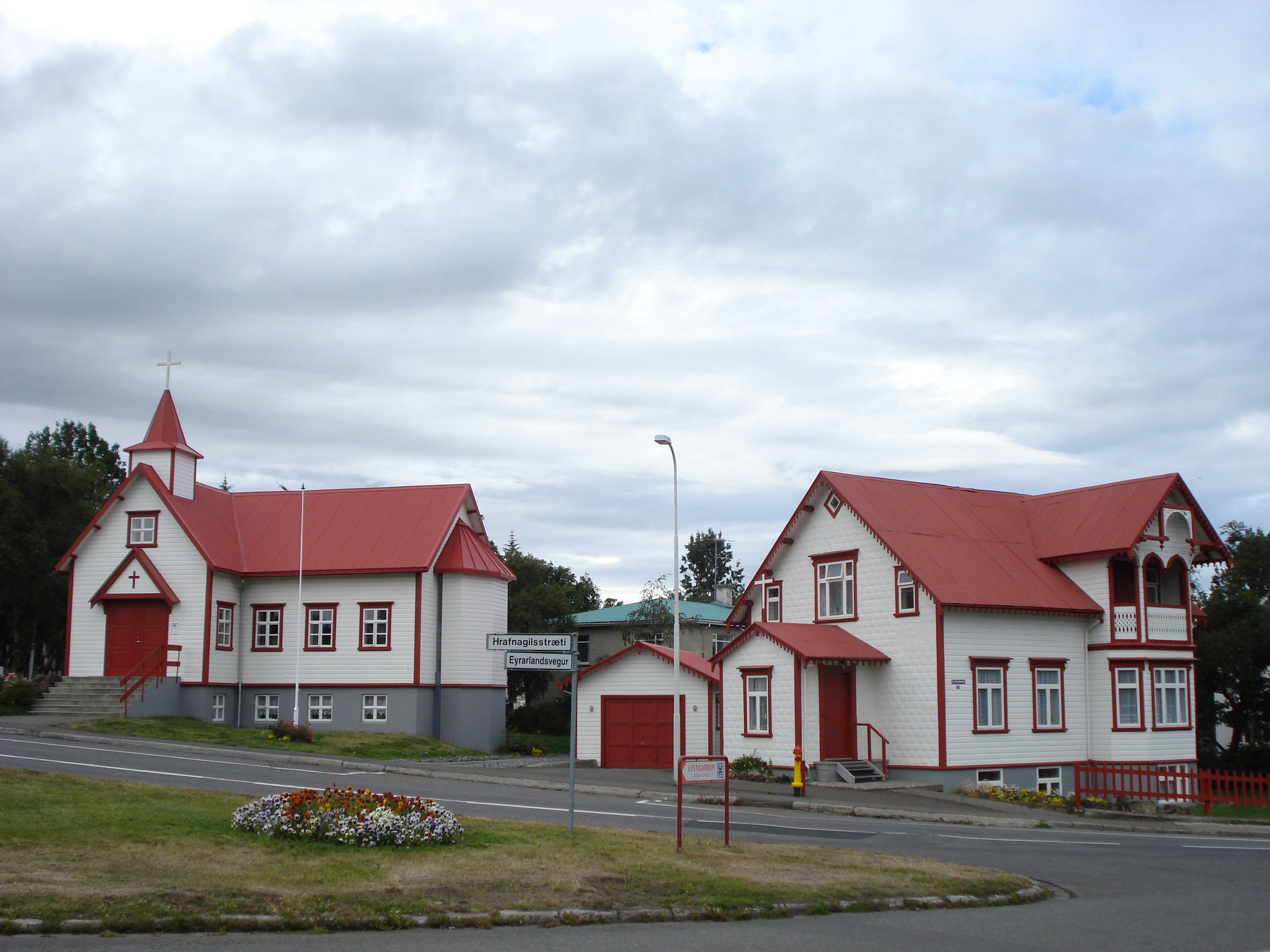
Catholic church of Akureyri.

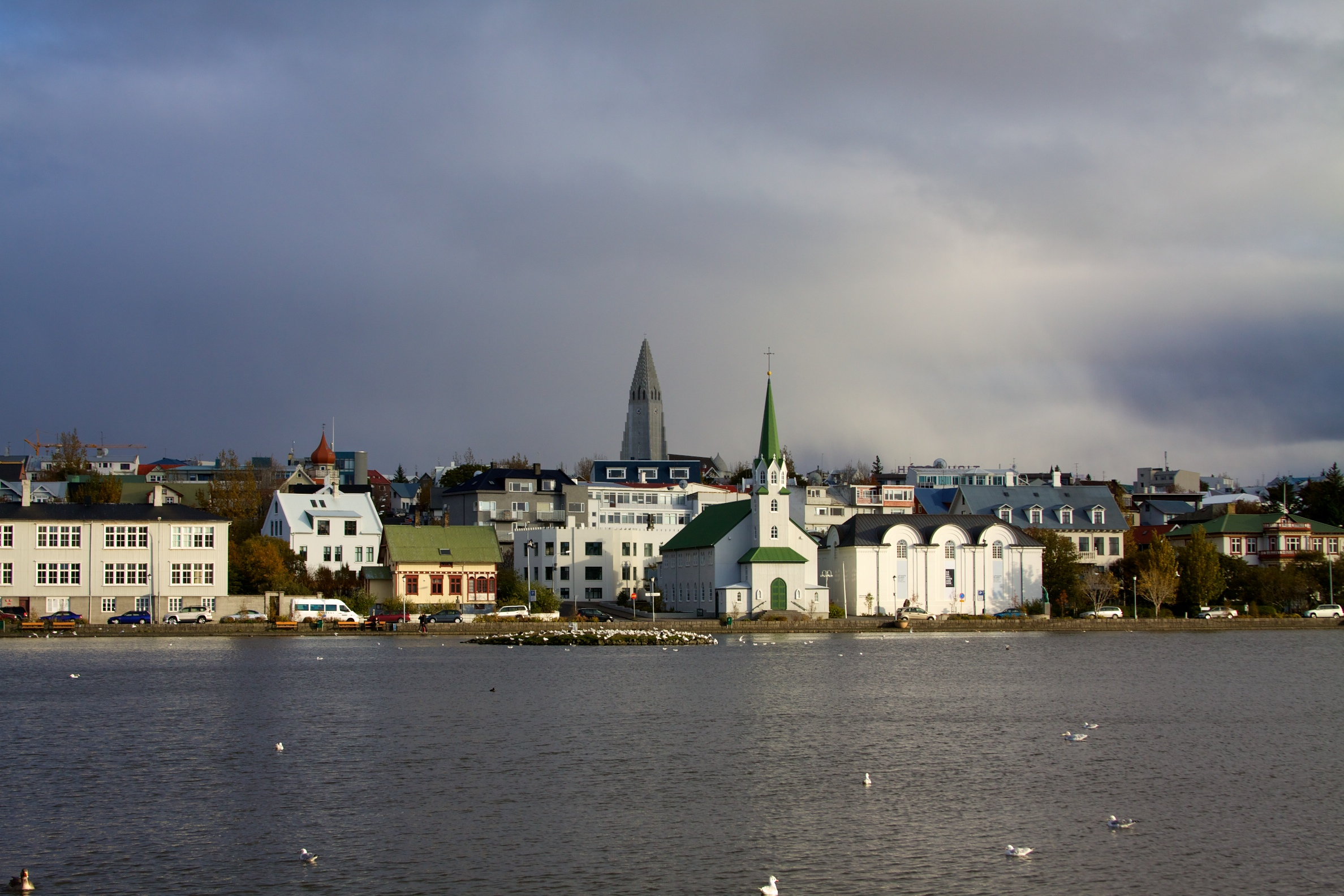
Building of the Reykjavík Free Church in the foreground, and the Hallgrímskirkja in the background.

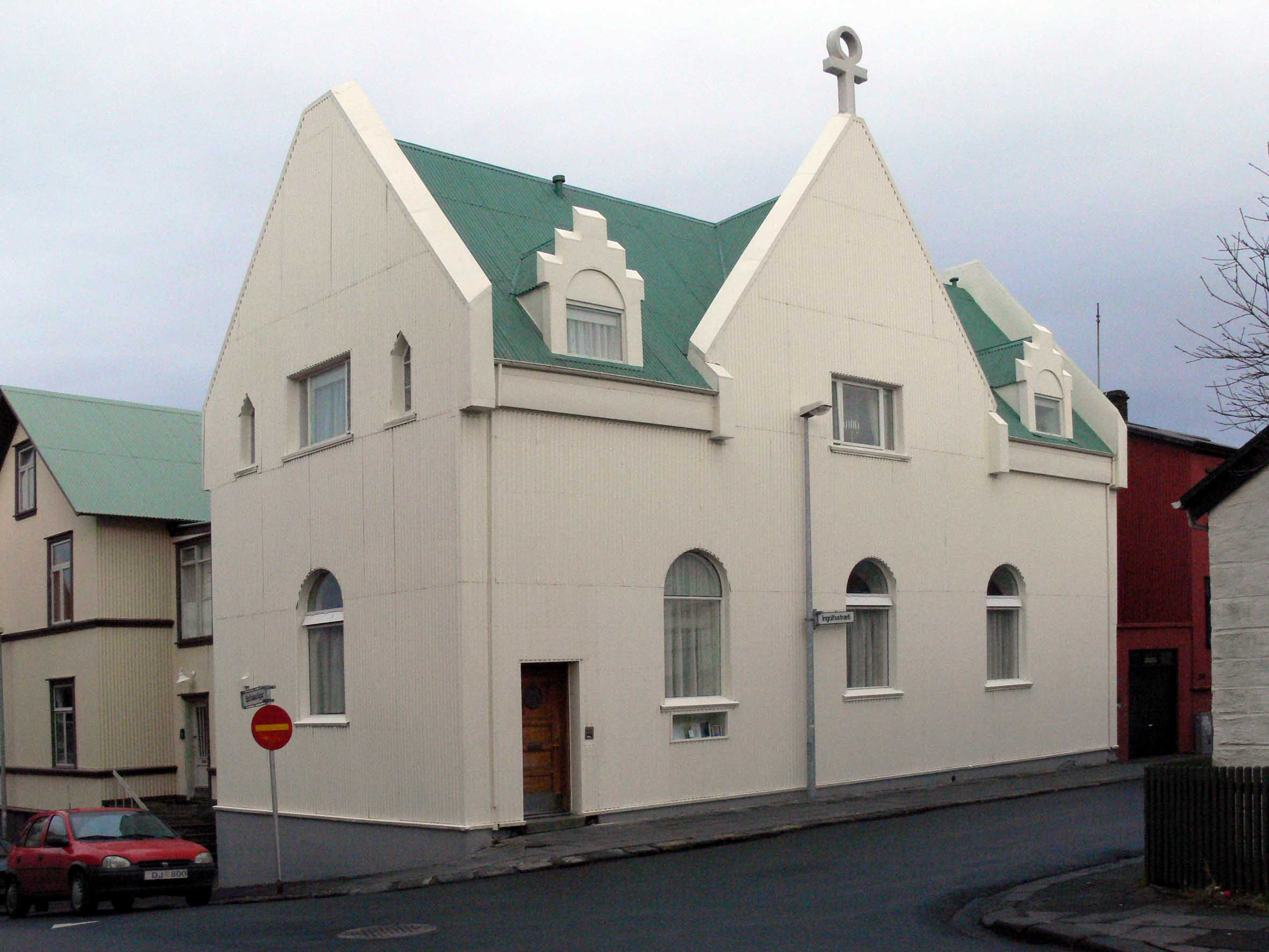
Building of the Theosophical Society in Reykjavík.

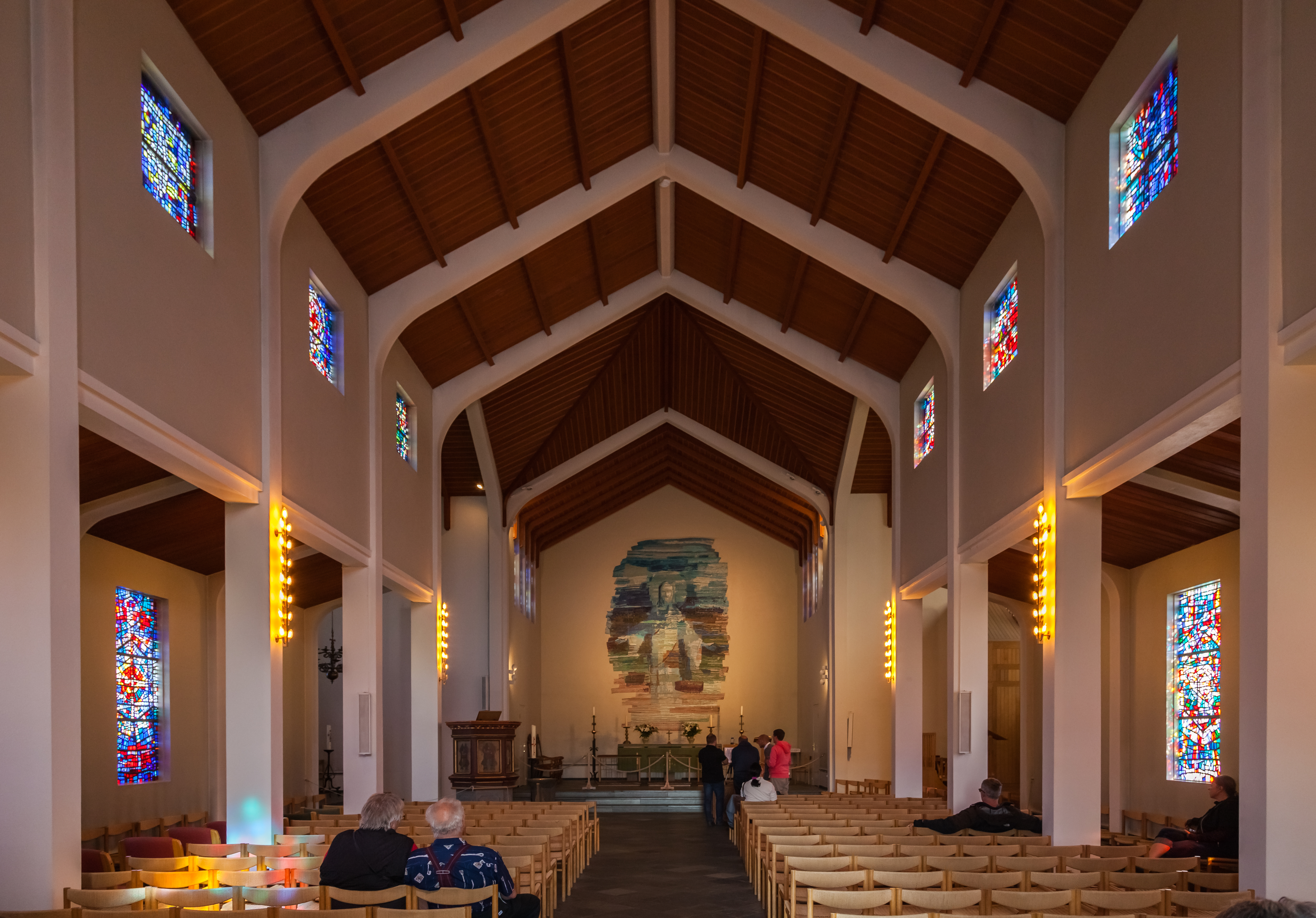
Interior of the Lutheran cathedral of Skálholt.

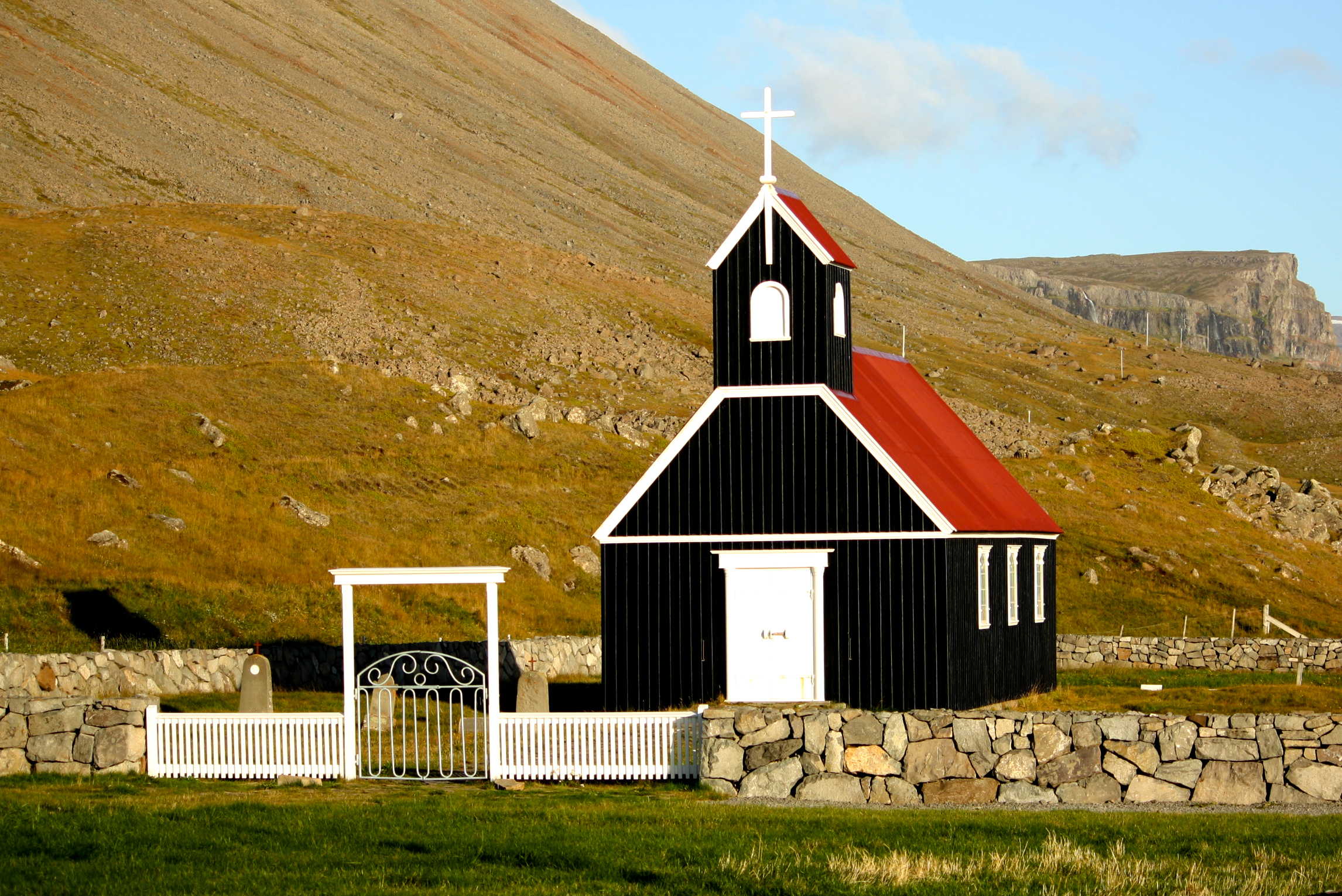
Wooden church in the Westfjords.

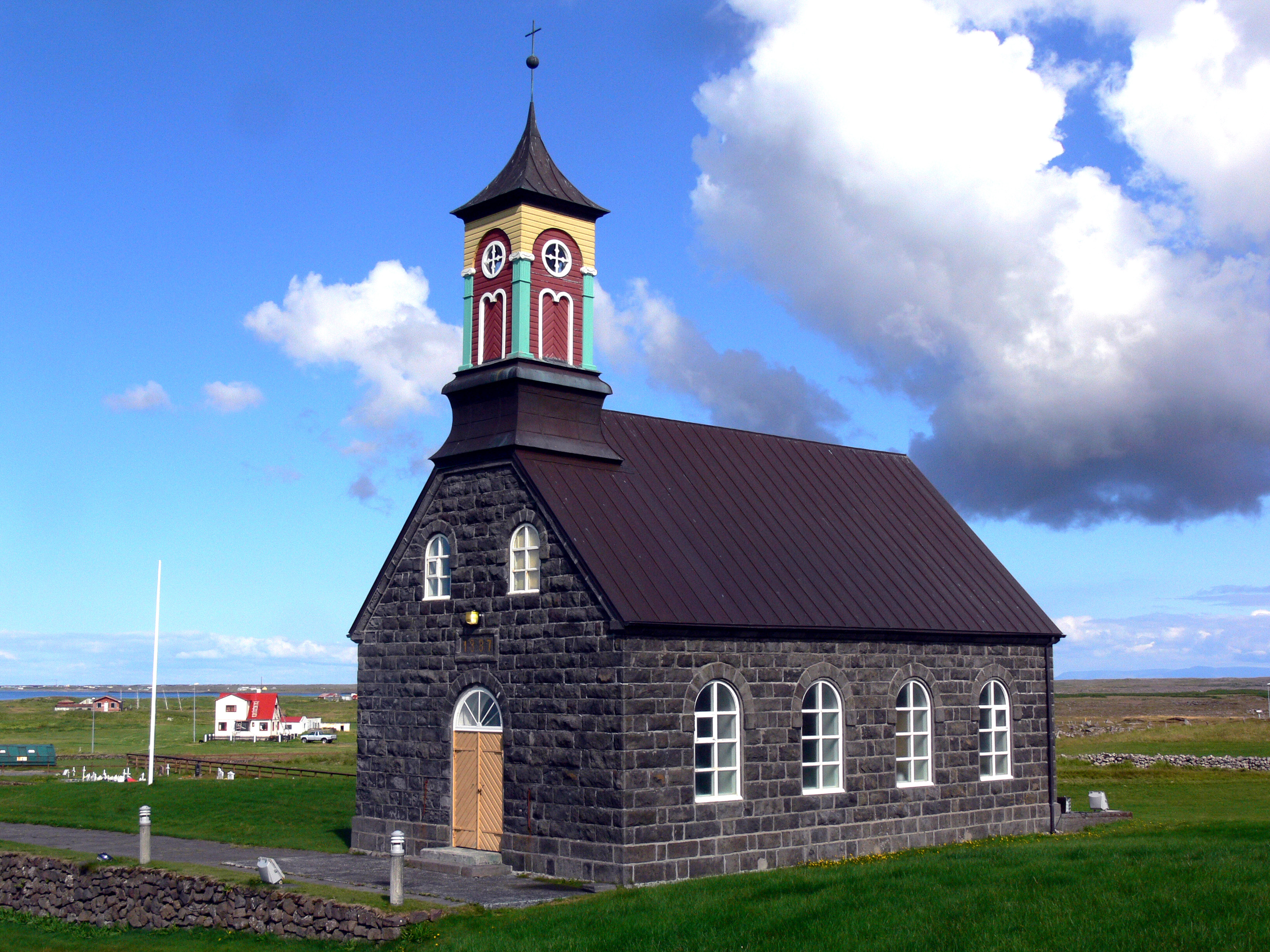
Stonen church in Hvalsnes, Reykjanes.

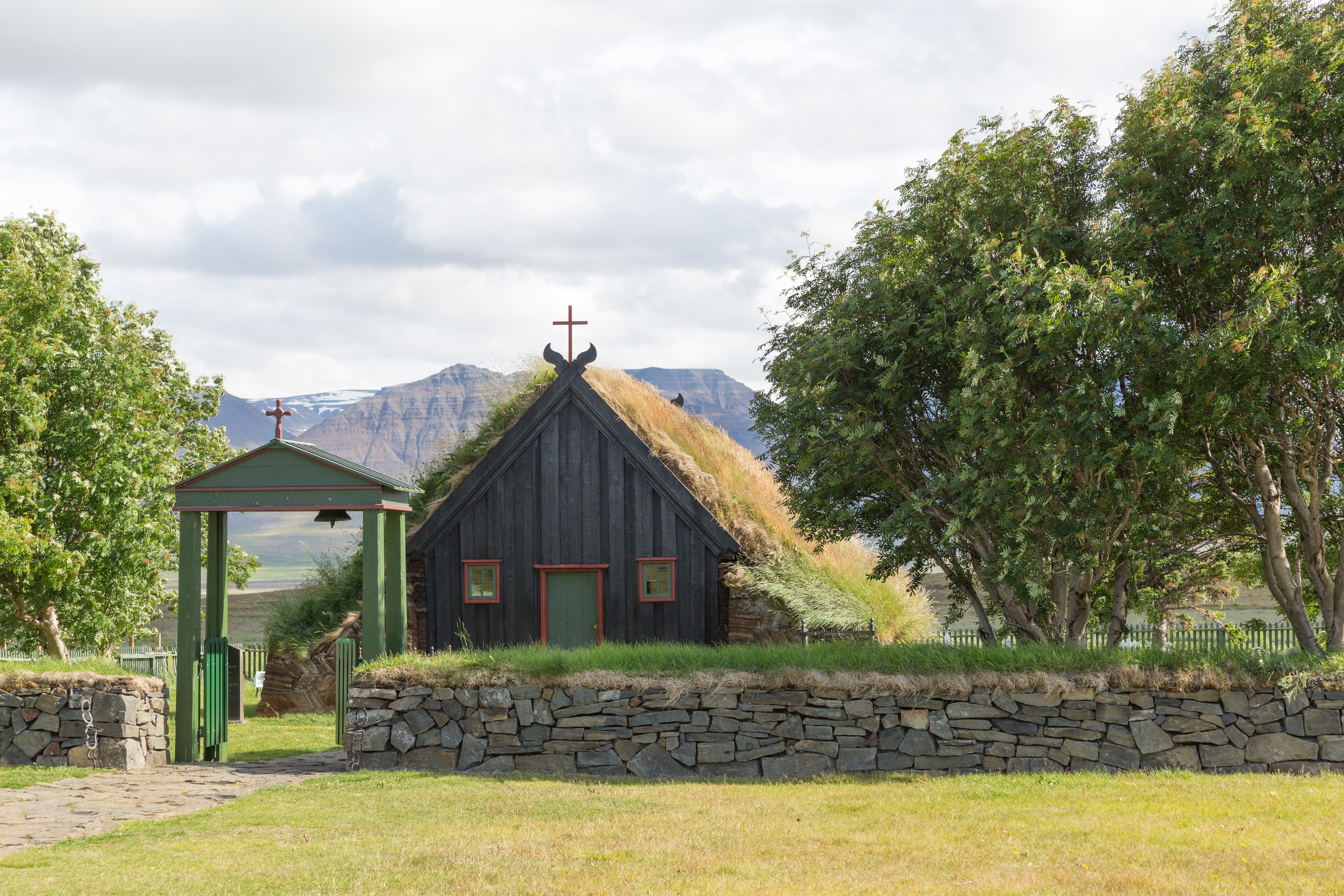
Turfen church in Víðimýri.

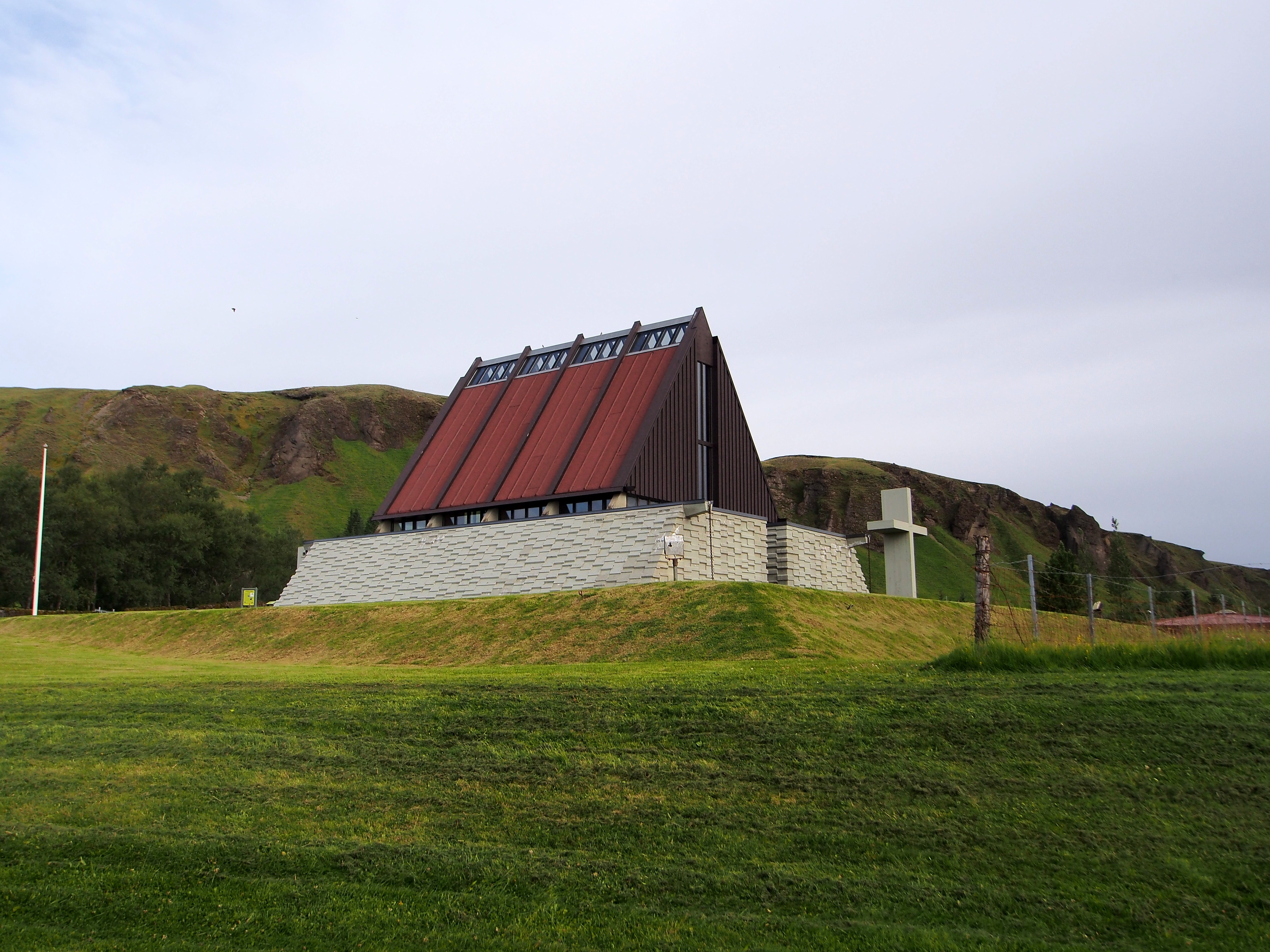
Modern church in Kirkjubæjarklaustur.

== See also ==
- Christianisation of Scandinavia
- Religion in Norway
- Religion in Europe
