= History of Christianity in Iceland =

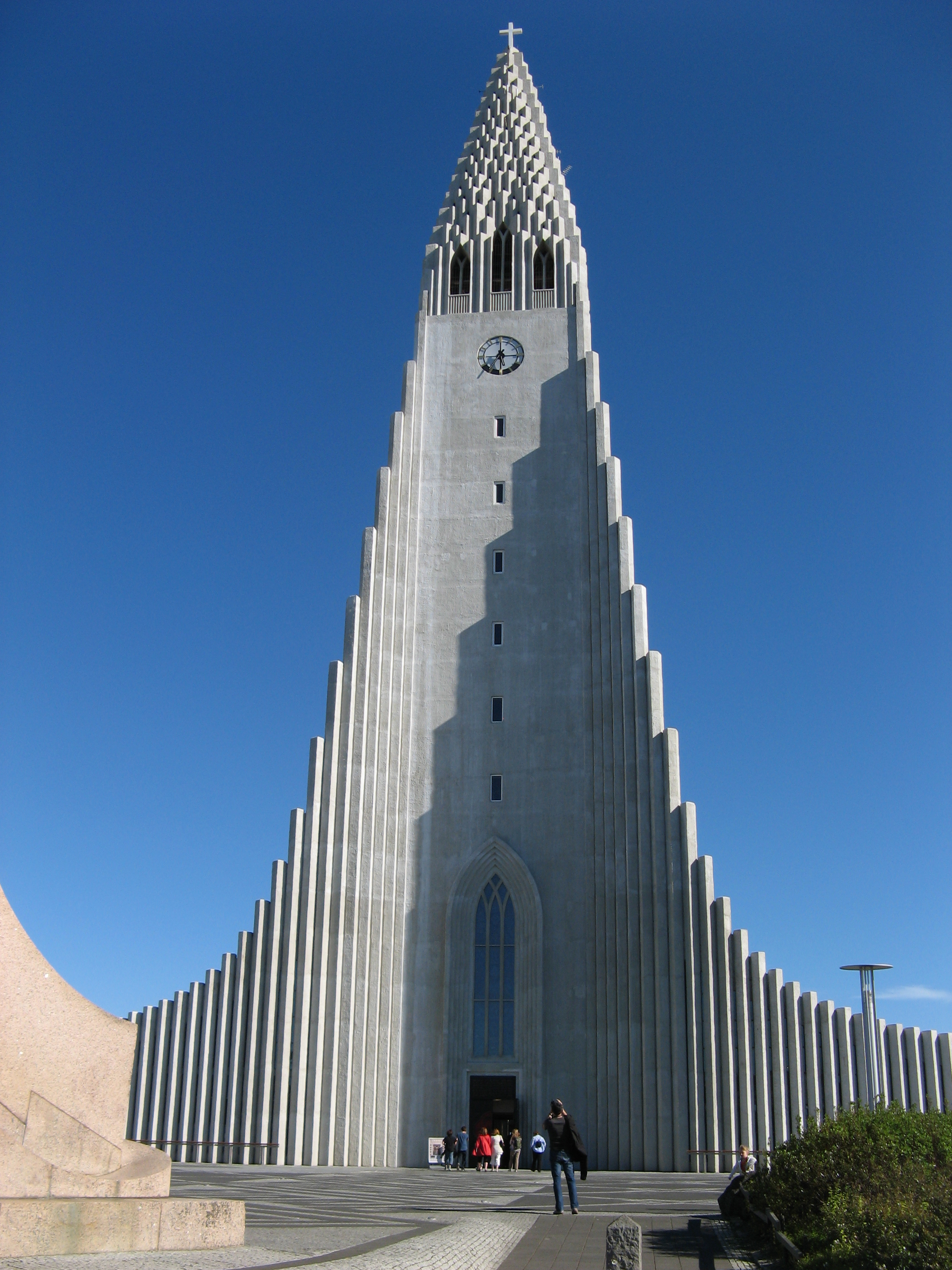
Hallgrímskirkja, a modern church in Reykjavík

Iceland in the North Atlantic

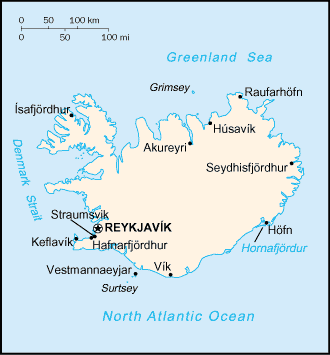
Map of contemporary Iceland

The history of Christianity in Iceland can be traced back to the Early Middle Ages when Irish hermits settled in Iceland, at least a century before the arrival of the first Norse settlers in the 870s. Christianity started to spread among the Icelanders at the end of the 10th century. The adoption of the new faith by the whole population was the consequence of a compromise between the Christian and heathen chieftains, as well as the lawspeaker, at the national assembly or Alþingi of 999 or 1000.

Initially missionary bishops and priests of foreign origin composed the clergy, but the number of local priests quickly increased. The first Icelandic bishop, Ísleifur Gissurarson was consecrated in 1056. Within fifty years two dioceses were established in the island, with their seats at Skálholt and Hólar which were subordinated to foreign archbishops. Landowners had a preeminent role in the administration of Church affairs and earned significant income from the tithe after it was introduced in 1097. Legislation limited the bishops' authority until the end of the Commonwealth in 1264. The principle of the autonomy of the Church only prevailed at the middle of the 14th century. Monasteries, most of them established in the 12th and 13th centuries, became important centers of literature.

The Lutheran form of the Reformation which was introduced in Iceland between 1541 and 1551 caused fundamental changes in Church life, spirituality and culture. For instance, the bulk of Church estates was confiscated and the cult of saints was abolished. The first Icelandic translation of the New Testament was published in 1540, and of the whole Bible in 1584.

== First Christians (c. 795 – c. 1000) ==
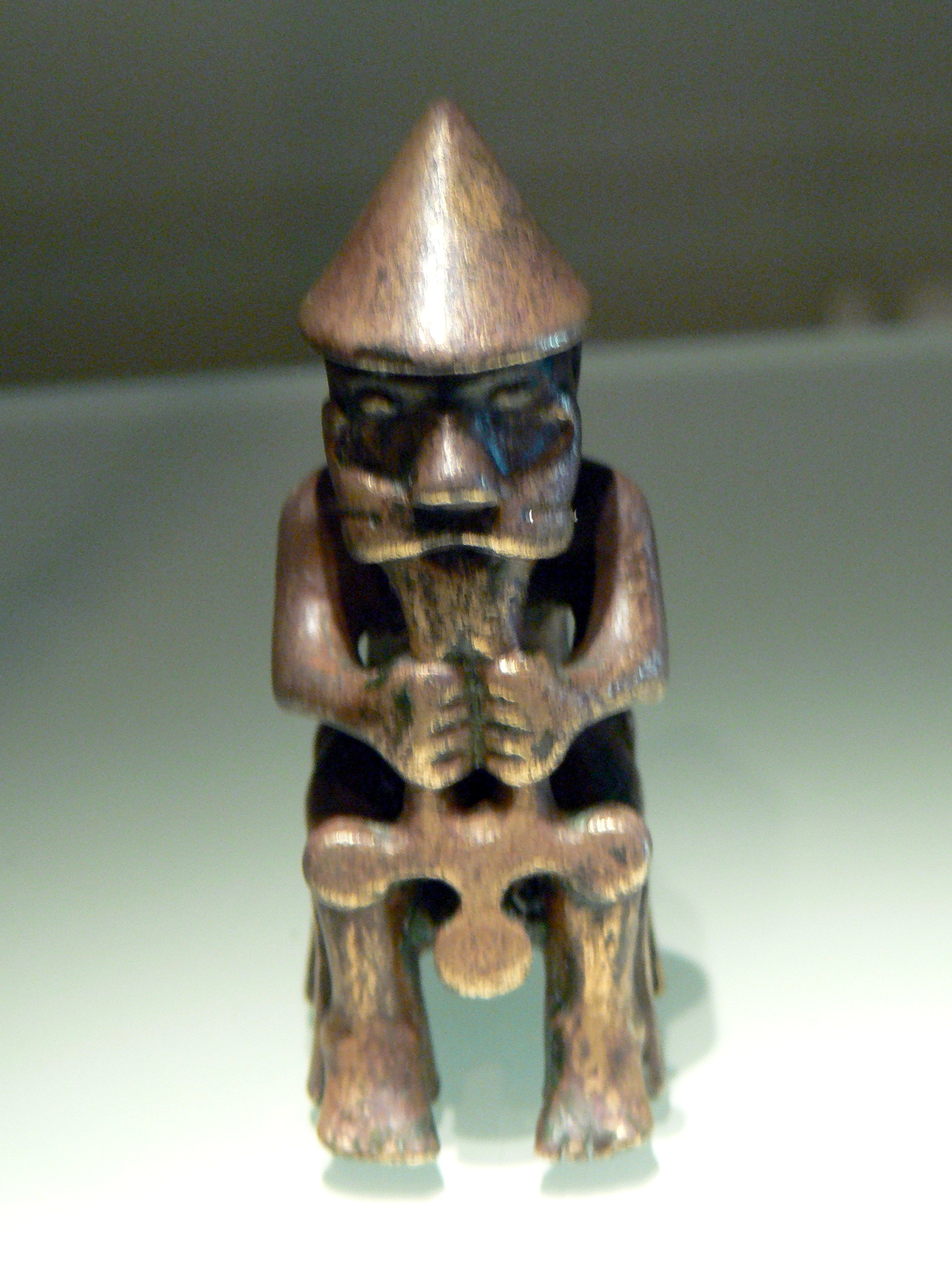
A 10th-century statue of Thor, the Norse god of thunder, found in Iceland

Irish monks voyaging in their small boats known as currachs seem to have been the first settlers to reach Iceland. For instance, Dicuil in his De Mensura Orbis Terrae ("Of the Dimensions of the World") writes of Irish hermits who spent, in 795, six months on an otherwise uninhabited island where the nights were so bright "not only at the time of the summer solstice, but for several days before and after" that a man could pick "lice from his shirt". The Íslendingabók ("The Book of the Icelanders") makes mention of Christians known as papar or fathers who had already settled in Iceland by the time the first Norse settlers arrived. They departed from the island leaving behind "Irish books, bells, croziers, and lots of other things" at the arrival of the new colonists.

The first Scandinavians reached Iceland in the middle of the 9th century, but its systematic colonization started in the early 870s. Although Christian individuals must have been among those who settled in Iceland, because many colonists arrived from Ireland, England or Scotland, the majority of the settlers were pagans. The latter remained strictly adhered to the cult of Odin, Thor and the other gods of Old Nordic religion. Paganism even strengthened following the establishment of the national assembly or Alþingi in 930 which gave rise to a process of unification among the Icelanders. The assembly was composed of chieftains or goðar who had a leading role in the pagan cults.

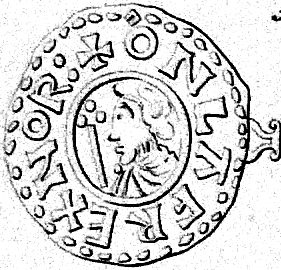
Coin of King Olaf I Tryggvason of Norway

Christian missionaries started to visit Iceland in the last decades of the 10th century. A German missionary bishop, Friedrich (Friðrekr) who arrived in 981 was the first among them. He was forced to depart from the island in 986 after his Icelandic aide, Thorvald Kodransson, had murdered two men in a battle. Next the Icelandic Stefnir Thorgilsson arrived, who had been dispatched with this mission by Olaf Tryggvason, king of Norway (r. 997–1000). He was expelled from the country after he had destroyed pagan sanctuaries. Likewise, the next missionary sent to Iceland by the king, the German or Flemish Thangbrand, was forced to leave around 999 because he had murdered some of those who opposed his mission. He reported to the king "that it was beyond all expectation that Christianity might yet be accepted" in Iceland, although he had succeeded in converting many chieftains. On hearing this, King Olaf decided to have all pagan Icelanders who were staying in Norway captured and to forbid all Icelanders from Norwegian ports. Since Norway was Iceland's main trading partner, Icelanders needed to maintain the peace. Accordingly, two Christian chieftains who were related to King Olaf, Gissur Teitsson and Hjalti Skeggjason, were sent to Norway. They promised the monarch that they would be making every effort to convert the whole island. In response, King Olaf released his hostages, many of whom were related to pagan Icelandic chieftains.

== Christianization (c. 1000) ==
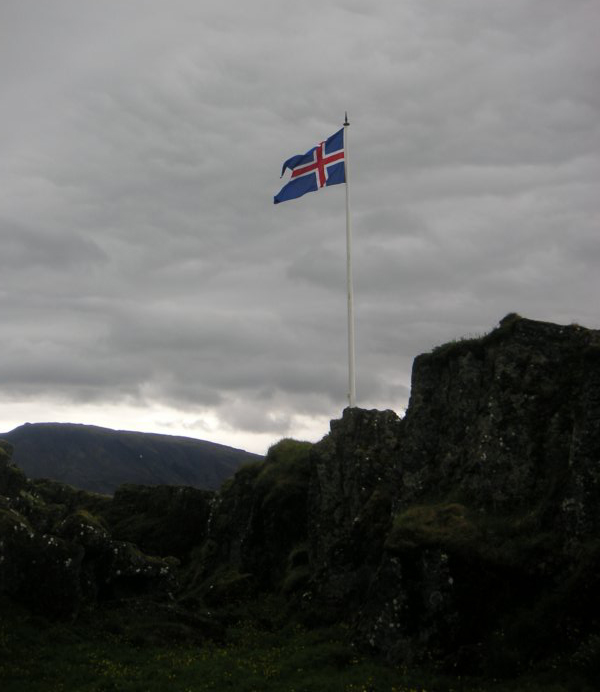
Law Rock or Lögberg at Thingvellir

Gissur Teitsson and Hjalti Skeggjason returned to Iceland. Initially they were planning to set up a separate administration for the Christians. The sharp contrast between the views of the most radical pagans and those of the Christian chieftains became manifest at the Alþingi of 999 or 1000. In order to avoid the breaking out of a civil war, the goðar finally agreed to appoint one of their number, the Lawspeaker Thorgeir Thorkelsson – who was a pagan – to decide the case. He withdrew for a whole day and then announced his decision to the assembled chieftains: all Icelanders had to be baptised, but heathens were allowed to worship Odin and the other gods in secret. He even permitted the continuation of the old practice of exposure of babies at birth and the eating of horsemeat, related to the importance of horses in Germanic paganism. Many goðar and their retinue were baptized on the spot in the cold water, but "all the people from the Northern and Southern Quarters were baptised in Reykjalaug in Laugardalr" where geothermal springs could be found. Legend says that Thorgeir Thorkelsson decided to throw all his domestic idols into a large waterfall which was named Goðafoss or "Gods' Waterfall" after this event.

[Thorgeir] lay down and spread his cloak over himself, and rested all that day and the following night, and did not speak a word. And the next morning, he got up and sent word that people should go to the Law Rock. And once people had arrived there, he began his speech, and said that he thought people's affairs had come to a bad pass, if they were not all have the same law in this country, and tried to persuade them in many ways that they should not let this happen, and said it would give rise to such discord that it was certainly to be expected that fights would take place between people by which the land would be laid waste. [...] "And it now seems advisable to me," he said, "that we too do not let those who most wish to oppose each other pervail, and let us arbitrate between them, so that each side has its own way in something, and let us all have the same law and the same religion. It will prove true that if we tear apart the law, we will also tear apart the peace." And he brought his speech to a close in a such a way that both sides agreed that everyone should have the same law, the one he decided to proclaim. It was then proclaimed in the laws that all people should be Christian, and that those in this country who had not yet been baptised should receive baptism; but the old laws should stand as regards the exposure of children and the eating of horse-flesh. People had the right to sacrifice in secret, if they wished, but it would be punishable by the lesser outlawry if witnesses were produced.

— The Book of the Icelanders

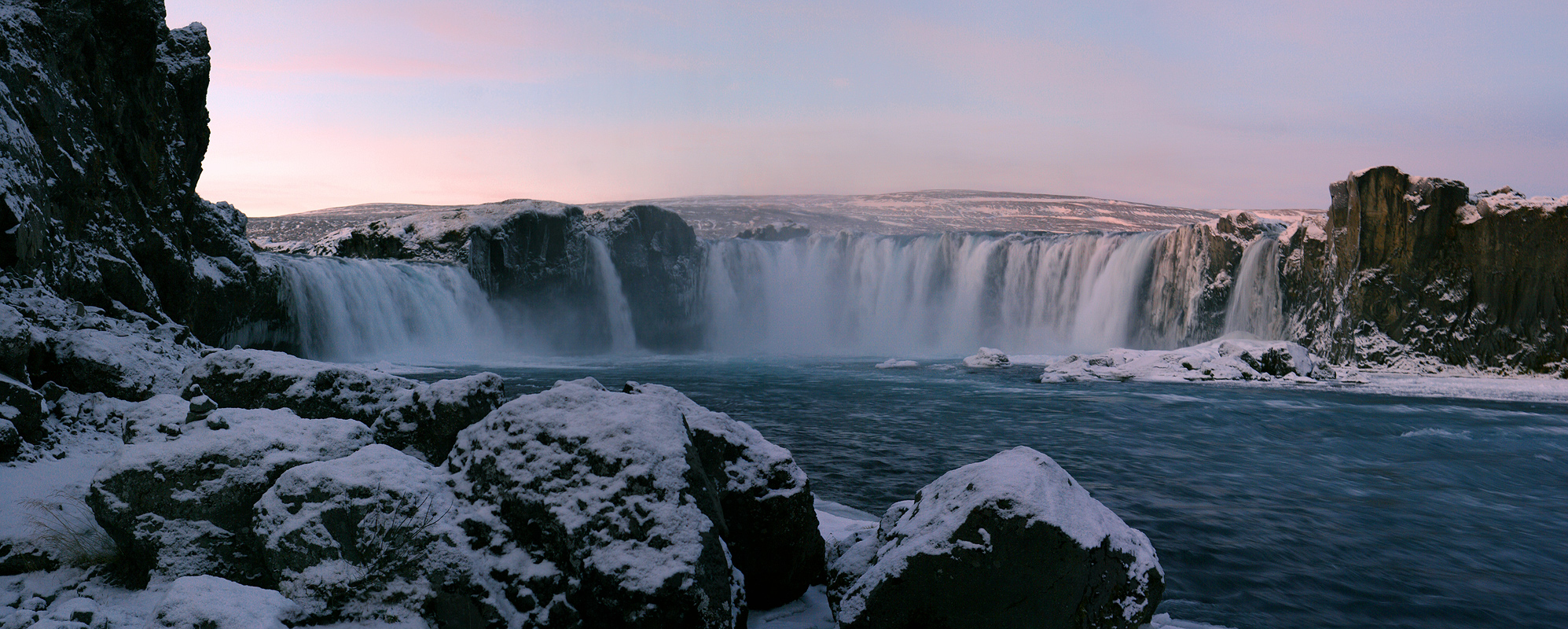
Goðafoss or "Gods' Waterfall"

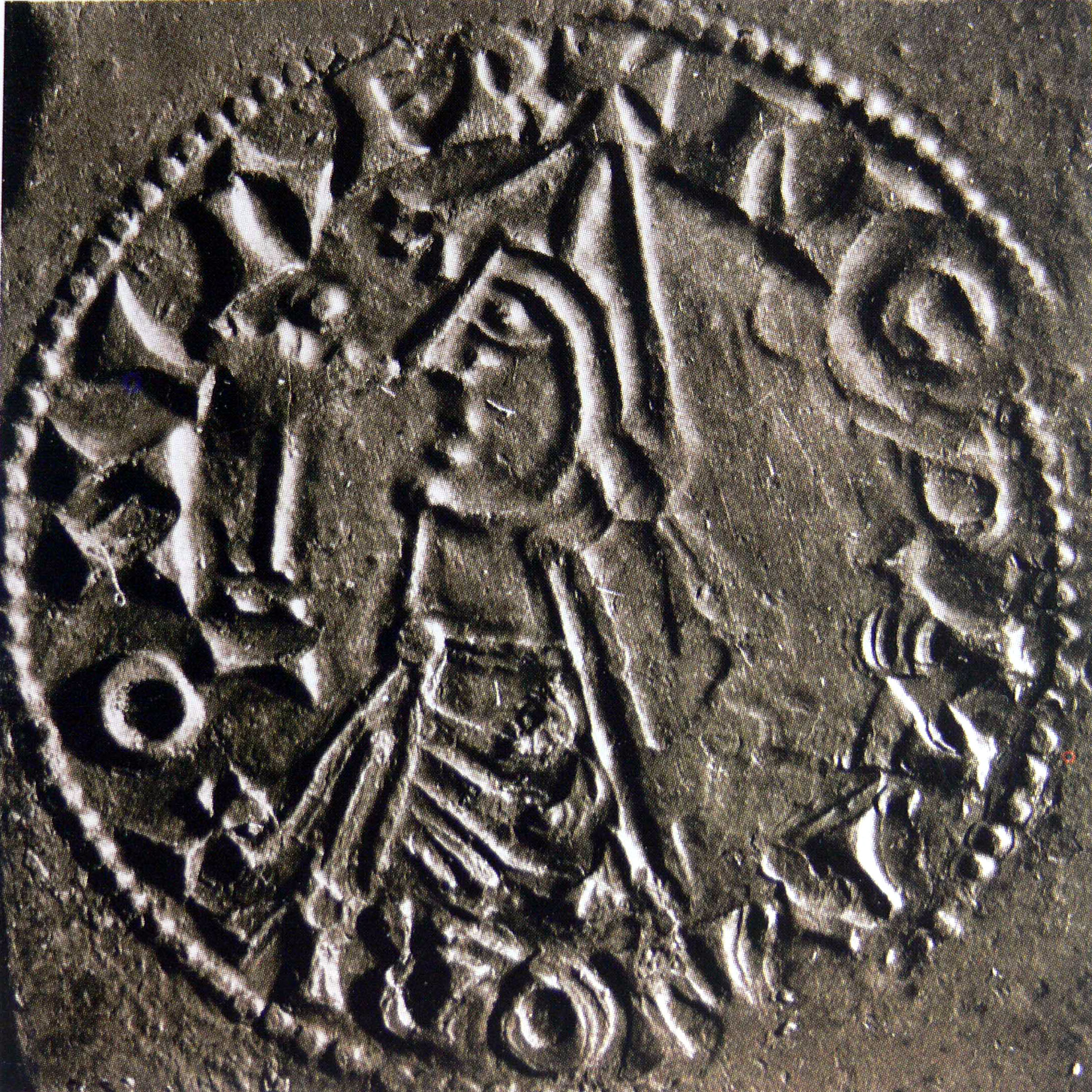
Coin of King Olaf II of Norway

The story of the consensual conversion of Iceland was first recorded by Ari Thorgilsson in the early 12th century. Historian Gunnar Karlsson states that Ari Thorgilsson's narration is "unbelievable, but it is the only one we have". All the same, the story "has been used to suggest that voluntary Christianization of an entire population was possible, without any link to a central power" (Nora Berend). Thorgeir Thorkelsson's verdict can even be cited as a "measure of crisis management to save Iceland from a bitter split". On the other hand, the historian Anders Winroth emphasizes that the goðar, through their conversion, "monopolized religion for their group, making it more difficult for new men to join their ranks".

It is without doubt that social attitudes changed radically in short time after the conversion. For instance, duels which had traditionally been fought at Thingvellir were prohibited and slavery declined from the early 11th century. All pagan customs confirmed by Thorgeir Thorkelsson's verdict – including the worship of Norse deities in private – were abolished in 1016, mainly due to the efforts by King Olaf II of Norway. The grateful monarch sent a bell and timber after this decision in order to promote the erection of a church at Thingvellir.

== Middle Ages (c. 1000–1536) ==
=== Icelandic Commonwealth (c. 1000–1264) ===
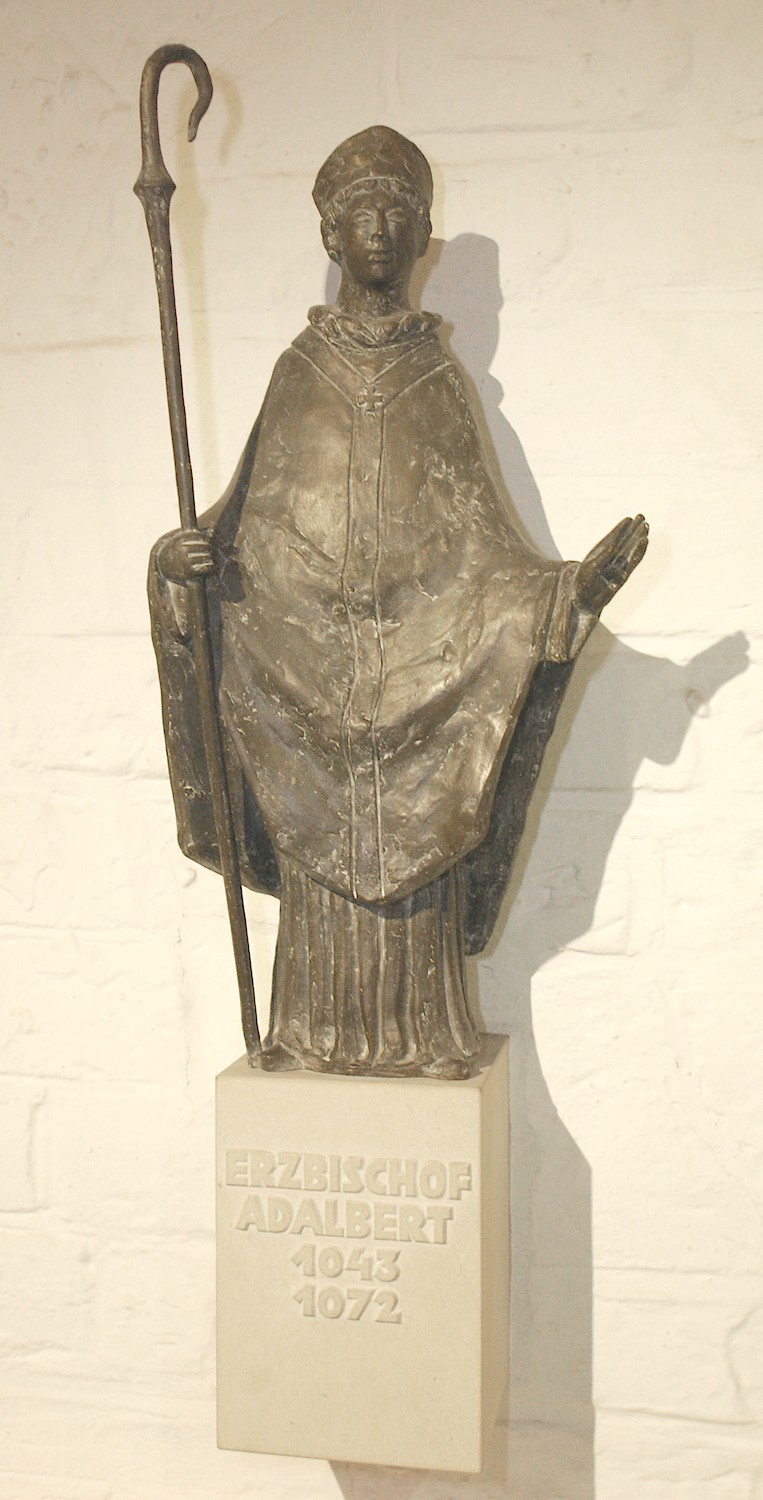
Archbishop Adalbert of Hamburg

The institutional framework of Christianity was developing in the 11th century. Individual landowners – either goðar or simple farmers – played a preeminent role in the process: they built the earliest churches and employed the first priests. Accordingly, most churches were for centuries controlled and administered by them and by their descendants, which contributed to the evolution of "a system of privately run churches" (Gunnar Karlsson).

The first clergymen were foreigners, mostly from England or the Holy Roman Empire. However, it was not unusual, at least up until the 1150s, that goðar were ordained as priests. A landowner could also hire a poor young man to be trained for the priesthood in order to serve in his sponsor's church. Such a cleric or kirkjuprestr had limited freedom, because his employer was entitled by law to force him to return if he had departed from the church entrusted to him. Likewise a priest hired by a landowner – known as ðingaprestr – became a member of his employer's household, but he received a regular fee for his services and could serve in more than one church.

It is lawful for a man to have a priestling taught for his church. He is to make an agreement with the boy himself if he is sixteen winters old, but if he is younger, he is to make it with his legal administrator. The whole agreement they make between them is to be binding. If they make no special agreement and a man takes the priestling for his church in accordance with the article of the law, then he is to provide him with instruction and fostering; and have him chastised only in such a way that it brings no shame on the boy or his kin; and treat him as if he were his own child. [...] If a priest absconds from the church for which he was taught or absents himself so that he does not hold services as prescribed, then the man who receives him into his home or hears services from him or shares living quarters with him is liable to full outlawry.

— Gray Goose Laws

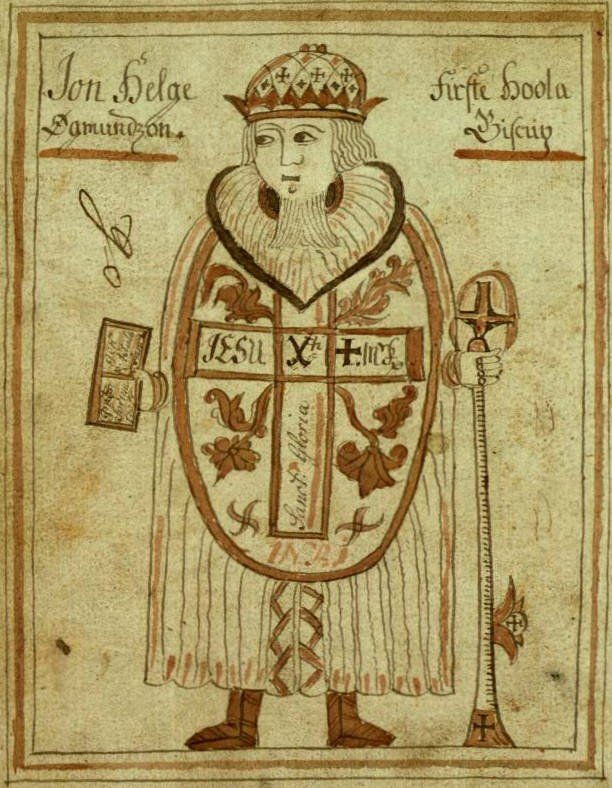
Bishop Jón Ögmundsson of Hólar

Besides landowners, missionary bishops played a significant role in the early development of the local Church. The Íslendingabók enumerates a number of them, including "Jóhan the Irishman", and Bernard from England, who spent a couple of years in Iceland. The last of these "wandering bishops" (Anders Winroth), Rudolph departed from Iceland in 1050.

The first local prelate, Gissur Teitsson's son, Ísleifur was elected at the Alþingi of 1055. His earlier studies in the school of Herford Abbey made him a suitable candidate, although he had been living in marriage. Following his election, the Alþingi requested him to make a journey abroad in order to be consecrated. Ísleifur visited Archbishop Adalbert of Hamburg (r. 1043-1072) who ordained him as bishop on Whitsun in 1056. Bishop Ísleifur settled in his family's farm at Skálholt, but his position remained similar to a missionary bishop because he had not been ordained to a particular episcopal see. The Hungrvaka adds that he had to compete with "bishops from other lands" who were supported by many locals because they were less demanding. Byock, and other specialists identify these prelates with five foreigners mentioned in the Íslendingabók who "called themselves bishops". Íslendingabók adds that three of them arrived from ermskir, which has been identified with Armenia or Ermland. It is without doubt that they represented a Paulician or other doctrine alien to Western theology. Accordingly, Archbishop Adalbert "sent his brief out to Iceland and forbade the men to accept all services from them" because they had been excommunicated.

If bishops or priests come to this country who are not versed in the Latin language, whether they are "Armenians" or Ruthenians, it is lawful for people to hear their services if they wish. But they are not to be paid for services and no priestly office is to be accepted from them. If anyone allows a bishop who is not versed in Latin to consecrate a church or to confirm children, he must pay a fine of three marks to the resident bishop and the latter is also to take the consecration fee.

— Gray Goose Laws

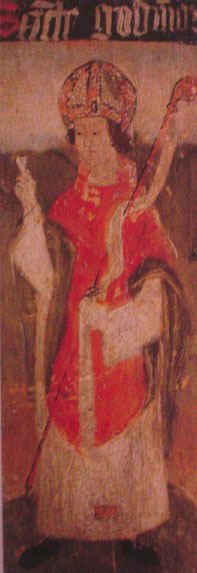
Bishop Guðmundur Arason of Hólar

Bishop Ísleifur set up a school at Skálholt in order to educate the local clergy. He died in 1080. The Alþingi appointed, in 1082, his son, Gissur to succeed him. At the assembly, all chieftains promised the future bishop that they would accept his decisions without resistance. At Pope Gregory VII's order, Gissur Ísleifsson was consecrated by the archbishop of Magdeburg, because the archbishop of Hamburg was the pope's enemy at that time. Bishop Gissur proclaimed Skálholt his see and donated his inherited farm to the new diocese. He achieved the introduction of the tithe at the Alþingi of 1097. Revenue from the tithe was divided into four parts among the bishop, the local priest, the church and the poor. Landowners who administered a church were entitled to the part of the tithe which served the upkeep of the church building. Moreover, they also received the part due to the priest if the latter was a member of their household.

Upon the request of the inhabitants of the Northern Quarter, Bishop Gissur approved of the establishment of a second bishopric with its see at Hólar. Its first prelate, Jón Ögmundsson was consecrated in 1106 by the archbishop of Lund in Denmark. The heads of the two Icelandic dioceses remained suffragans to the archbishops of Lund until the new archbishopric of Nidaros was established in Norway in 1153.

Many bishops in the period were related to the Haukdaelir, Oddaverjar or other powerful families. Laymen often required bishops to act as impartial peacemakers or advisors which suggests the Icelandic prelates' highly esteemed social status. On the other hand, bishops had little real authority, even their judicial power was limited. The Alþingi passed the laws governing Christian life and the relations between the Church and laymen in 1123. These legal provisions were in a decade included in the Grágás or Gray Goose Laws. The Christian Law Section of this law book authorized the secular courts to hear cases where clerics were involved, with the exception of a priest's disobedience which was to be judged by the bishop. However, bishops often turned to secular courts to hear such cases, because they had no power to execute their own judgements.

Bishop Thorlak Thorhallsson of Skálholt (1178–1193) was the first prelate in Iceland who attempted to repress secular influence in Church affairs. For instance, he often persuaded landowners who built a church on their estates to donate it to the Church, although he always gave back the same real estate in benefice. In the next century, Bishop Guðmundur Arason of Hólar (1203–1237) make every effort to strengthen his control over clergymen and Church property. However, chieftains opposing his policy expelled him from his see. He often turned to his superior, the archbishop of Nidaros to defend his case, which created an opportunity for the Norwegian prelate for intervening in the Icelandic Church affairs. The archbishop even refused to appoint the candidates the Alþingi proposed in 1237 to the two Icelandic episcopal sees and consecrated his two fellow countrymen as bishops. The Alþingi acknowledged the superiority of canon law over secular legislation in 1253.

Bishop Jón Ögmundsson of Holár initiated the establishment of the first monastery in Iceland, Þingeyraklaustur, which was only set up after his death, in 1133 at Thingeyrar. Further six monasteries and one nunnery were established till the end of the Commonwealth, but three monasteries were quickly closed. Thingeyrar and two other abbeys accommodated Benedictine monks, the other monasteries were established for Augustinians. Monasteries served as important centers of culture: they owned libraries and their monks wrote new books. For instance, the early saga of Kings Olaf Tryggvason and Olaf II were recorded at the Thingeyrar Abbey. The latter monarch became – along with the Virgin Mary, Nicholas and Peter – one of the most popular saints in Iceland where a couple of churches were dedicated to him. Bishop Thorlak Thorhallsson of Skálholt was the first Icelander whose piety gave rise to the emergence of a popular cult after his death. His veneration was sanctioned by his successor at the Alþingi of 1198, but the Holy See did not approved this action for almost 800 years. Likewise, Bishop Jón Ögmundsson of Holár's cult which emerged in the Northern Quarter was only sanctioned by one of his successors in 1200.

=== Norwegian rule (1264–1380) ===
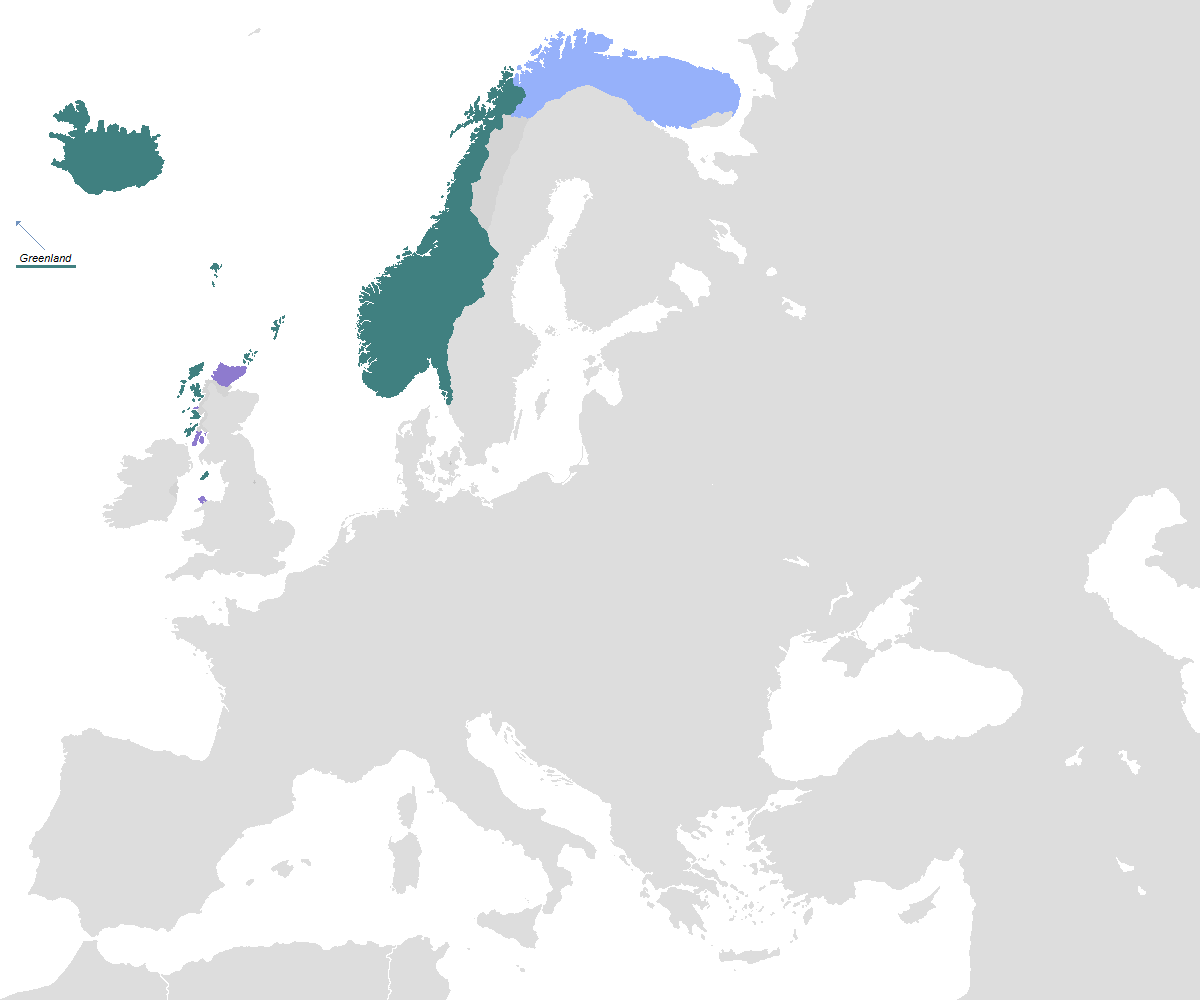
Norway and its dependencies around 1263

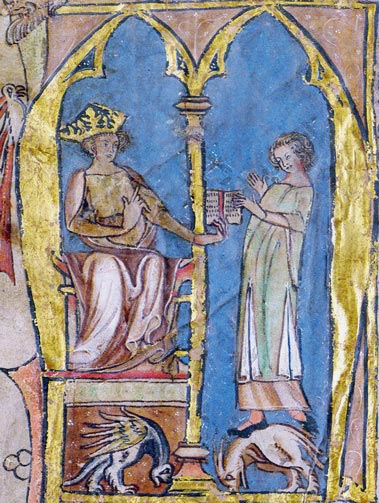
King Magnus VI the Lawmender

The 13th-century historian, Snorri Sturluson was the first Icelandic chieftain who swore allegiance, around 1220, to a Norwegian monarch. However, it was Gissur Thorvaldsson, Earl of Iceland (r. 1258–1268) who between 1262 and 1264 persuaded all goðar to accept the suzerainty of King Hakon IV Hakonson of Norway (r. 1217–1263). Hakon Hakonson's successor, King Magnus VI Hakonson (r. 1263–1280) decided to reform the law of all his realms and issued a new law code for Iceland. Its provisions governing Church life – the so-called Kristinréttr nýi ("New Christian Laws") – declared that the Church and its property were to be administered without any interference by laymen. These provisions were first (in 1275) introduced in the diocese of Skálholt, but only in 1354 in the bishopric of Hólar. Thereafter bishops had exclusive jurisdiction over clergymen in both dioceses which contributed to the spread of clerical celibacy.

Bishop Árni Thorlaksson of Skálholt (r. 1269–1298) set about claiming effective control over all churches and their property in his diocese. His agreement of 1297 with King Eric II Magnusson (r. 1280–1299) authorized him to administer most church farmsteads. Laymen were only allowed to control parcels with a church in which they had at least a half-share. This transformation of the legal system caused that many freeholders became tenants of the Church.

Two new monasteries were established under Norwegian rule: one at Reynistaðr and the other at Möðrruvellir in 1296. Cathedral chapters were set up in this period. Bishop Jorund of Hólar was the first prelate to have been authorized to organize a kórsbræðr or body of canons at his see in 1267. However, the exact date when the chapter at Skálholt Cathedral was set up is unknown.

=== First centuries of the Danish rule (1380–1536) ===
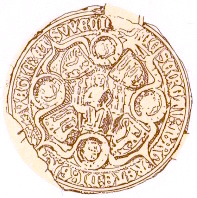
Queen Margaret's seal

King Haakon VI of Norway (1343–1380) was succeeded by his minor son, Olaf Haakonsson (1380–1387) who had some years before inherited Denmark. Upon the young king's death, his mother, Queen Margaret (1387–1412) followed him as "the mighty lady and right master" of Denmark, Norway and all their dependencies, including Iceland. Thereafter Iceland remained united with Denmark for more than five centuries.

The epidemic known as Black Death reached Iceland in 1402. It devastated the country for 18 or 19 months and caused the death of at least 50% of the population. For instance, 8 of the 14 nuns living at the Kirkjubæjarklaustur convent (including the abbess) died in the epidemic. Legend says that there were cases when only 4 or 5 of 15 people going to a funeral returned home because of the fast spread of the plague. The Black Death also contributed to the accumulation of Church property, because dying people often willed their estates to the Church. A second epidemic which ravaged in Iceland in 1495 and 1496 had similar, although less devastating consequences.

The so-called "English Century" of Icelandic history, which was characterized by the growing influence of English seamen and merchants, began around 1410. They were engaged in fishing and trading in stockfish and established several posts in Iceland. An Englishman, John Williamson Craxton even was consecrated as bishop of Hólar in 1431. He was accused of organizing a plot against Jöns Gerekesson, his fellow bishop at Skálholt. The latter, a Dane by birth, was King Eric VII of Denmark's favorite. He hired foreign mercenaries and set up his private army in order to plunder the countryside and capture many landowners. However, one of his followers murdered a young nobleman whose sister incited her fellow countrymen against the bishop. The rebels took the Hólar Cathedral, captured Bishop Jöns Gerekesson and drowned him in a river in 1433. In a few years, Bishop John Williamson Craxton was forced to leave his diocese. The last monastery in Iceland was established at Skriðuklaustur at the end of the "English Century" in 1493.

The English competed with the German merchants of the Hansa Towns for the control over trade with Iceland. The Danish monarchs supported the Germans in this conflict, but the English were expelled from all their posts in the period between 1490 and 1558. Alabaster altarpieces from England which have been preserved in Hólar and many other places in Iceland are traditionally dated to the "English Century".

Connections with the Hansa Towns contributed to the early appearance of Protestant ideas, because most German merchants who settled in Iceland accepted Martin Luther's teaching. On the other hand, Bishop Jón Arason of Hólar brought the first printing press to Iceland from Hamburg in 1530. The Roman Catholic Church accumulated significant wealth – including landed property, cattle, trading ships, and precious metals – by the end of the period. For instance, the Diocese of Skálholt had acquired around 9% of all the landholdings in the previous centuries.

== Reformation (1536–1627) ==
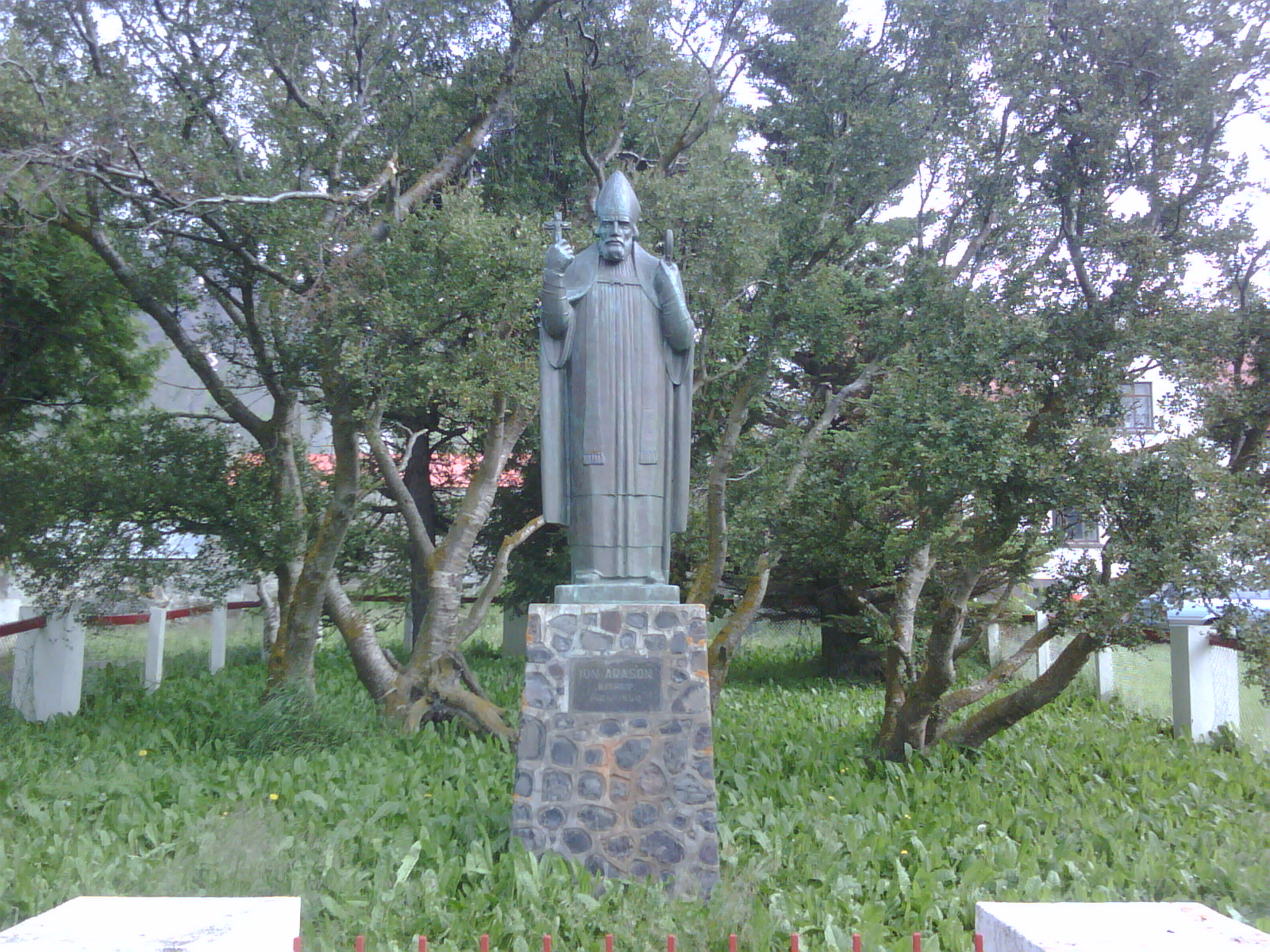
Modern statue of Bishop Jón Arason of Hólar (Munkaþverá, Iceland)

King Christian II of Denmark (1513–1523) was the first Scandinavian monarch to have contemplated the introduction of the Reformation in his realms, but he was dethroned. His attempts to regain his throne caused the outbreak of a civil war in Denmark which lasted from 1533 till 1536. The internal conflict ended with the victory of the deposed monarch's opponent, Christian III (1534–1559) who had since 1521 been a staunch supporter of Luther's views.

Young men studying in Germany were the first Icelanders who accepted Lutheran ideas, but most Icelanders remained faithful to their traditional faith. Furthermore, the two Catholic bishops – Ögmundur Pálsson of Skálholt and Jón Arason of Hólar – took over the government of the country for the years of the Danish civil war. However, a secret circle of young Lutheran intellectuals was developing in the court of Bishop Ögmundur Pálsson in the same period.

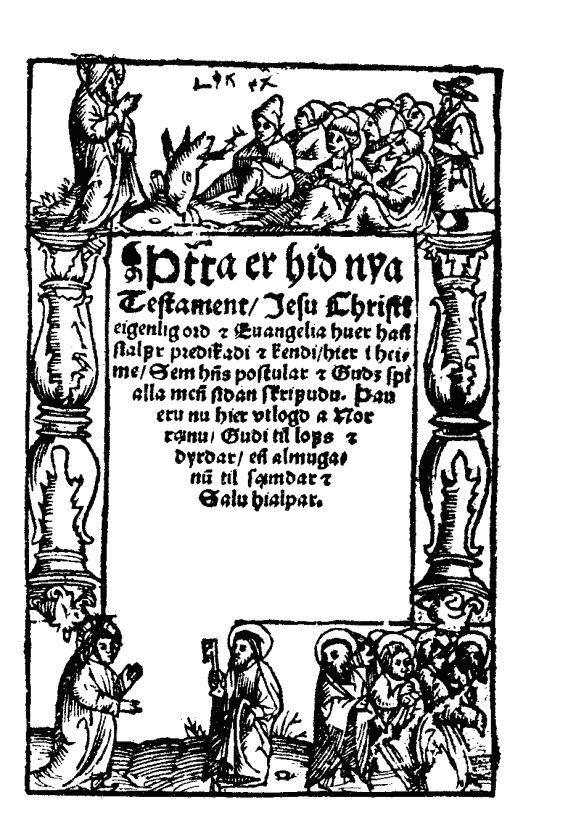
Title page of Oddur Gottskálksson's translation of the New Testament

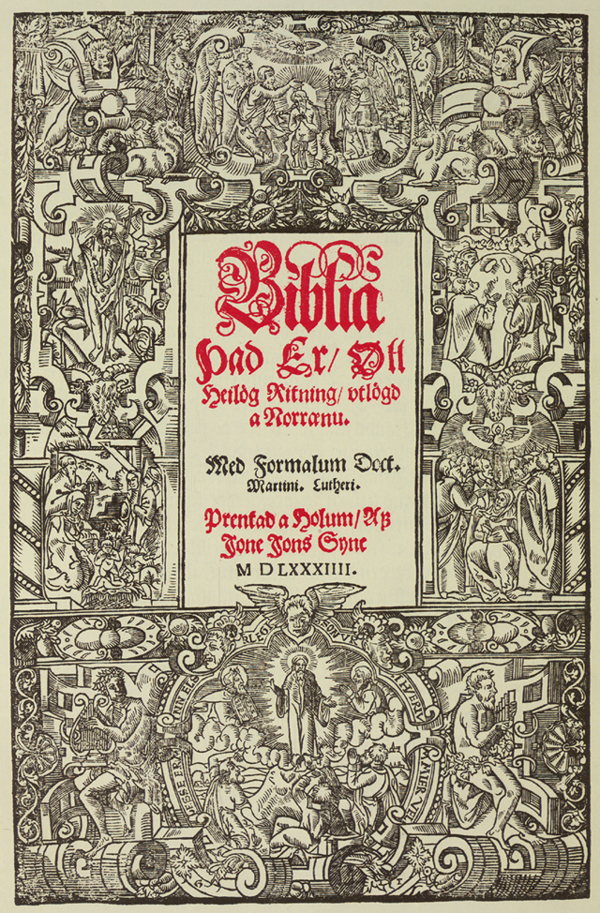
Title page of Bishop Guðbrandur Þorláksson's translation of the Bible

The elderly bishop openly opposed the Lutheran Church Ordinance which was introduced in Denmark in 1537. He excommunicated two royal officials who had taken Viðey Abbey and expelled the monks from there. The bishop's supporters even seized and killed one of the royal representatives in 1539. The nearly blind Bishop Ögmundur Pálsson decided to retire and proposed one of his favorites, Gissur Einarsson to succeed him.However, Gissur Einarsson was a secret Lutheran who set about introducing the Protestant principles of Church administration in Iceland. However, the Alþingi of 1540 insisted on the preservation of the traditional Church structure. The earliest Icelandic translation of the New Testament – which was made by Oddur Gottskálksson, one of the secret Lutherans at Bishop Ögmundur Pálsson's court – was published in Denmark in 1540.

A naval force sent by Christian III landed at Iceland in 1541. Assisted by Gissur Einarsson, the royal representatives persuaded the Alþingi of 1541 to accept the introduction of the Church Ordinance in the Diocese of Skálholt. However, Gissur Einarsson – who was consecrated as the first Lutheran bishop in Iceland – had to face the absence of trained Protestant clergymen. He made every effort to extinguish all traditions closely connected to Catholicism. Public opinion even attributed his unexpected death in 1548 to God's justice for his act of destroying a holy cross near Skálholt. Bishop Jón Arason of Hólar soon attempted to restore Catholicism in Skálholt by force, but the king declared him outlaw. Daði Guðmundsson, a wealthy Lutheran landowner managed to seize the bishop in autumn 1550. Jón Arason and his two sons were executed without trial on November 7, 1550. In next summer a new naval force arriving from Denmark forced the people of the Diocese of Hólar to accept the Church Ordinance, thus Reformation was introduced in the whole country.

The Reformation was a culture shock for the Icelanders. The veneration of saints was banned, the saints' relics and many traditional objects of liturgy were destroyed, and all monasteries were closed. Most Church properties – in value, around 19% of all landholdings – were confiscated for the Crown in 1554. One half of the tithe was also payable to the royal treasury from 1560. Even so, the two episcopal sees remained important centers of teaching, although for higher education clergymen had to visit Copenhagen. Bishop Guðbrandur Þorláksson of Hólar (1571–1627) and his disciples translated the whole Bible into Icelandic and their work was published in 1584. This translation strengthened the position of the vernacular in liturgy, thus Danish never was introduced in Church service in Iceland.

== Early Modern and Modern Times (1627–1944) ==
=== Dark Ages and absolutism (1627–1809) ===
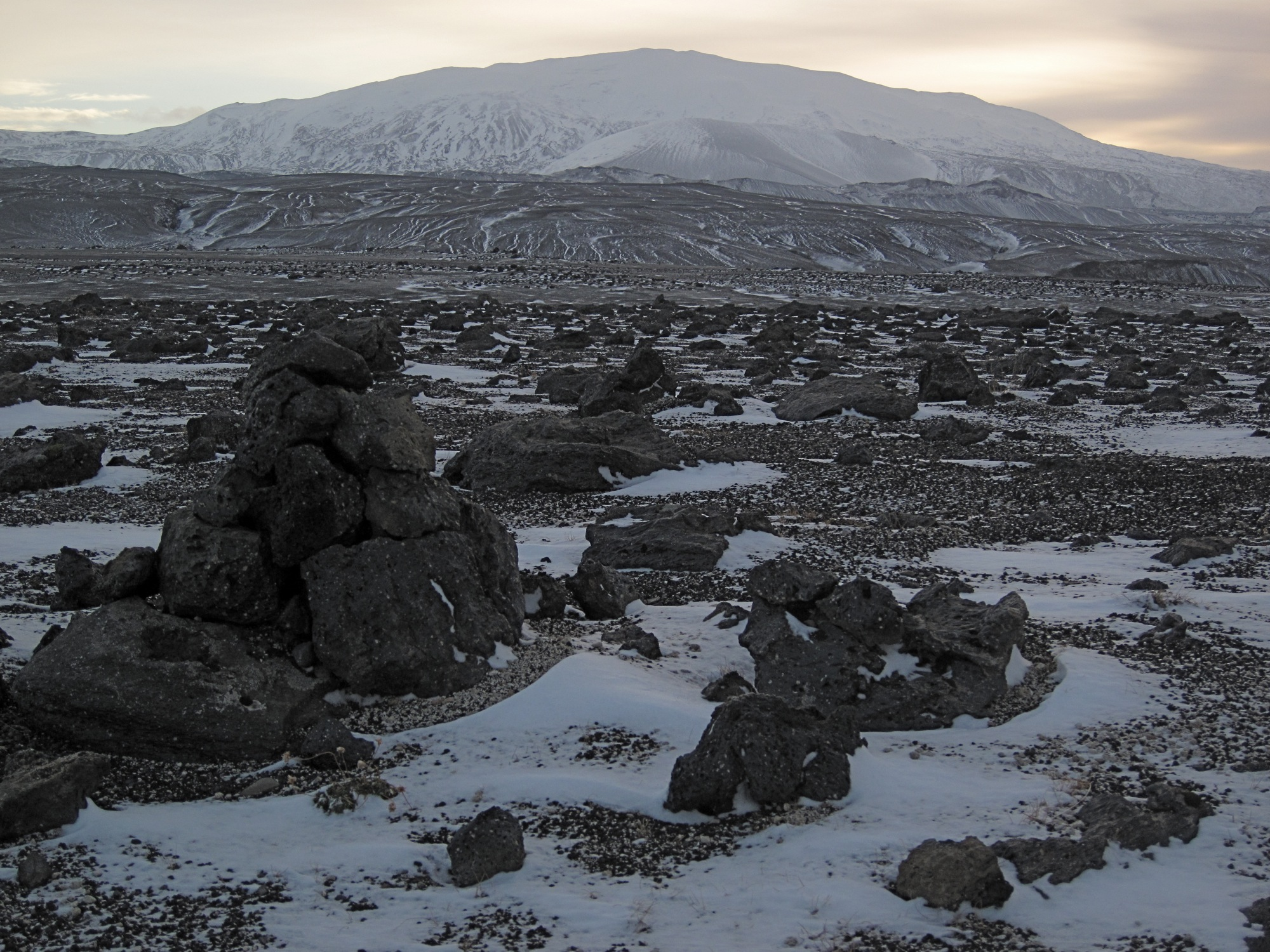
Mount Hekla, the main entrance to Hell, according to 16th-century believers

Spiritual literature flourished in the 17th century. For instance, Hallgrímur Pétursson Hallgrímur Pétursson (1614–1674), while serving as parson at Saurbær from 1651, composed his fifty Passíusálmar (Passion Hymns), which were first published in 1666 and rank among the best religious poetry of the world. The original manuscript in the poet's own hand is preserved at the National Library of Iceland and is listed in UNESCO's Memory of the World Register; the hymns have been published in almost 100 editions and translated into various languages , and Bishop Jón Vidalin of Skálholt (1698–1720) composed a popular book of Family Sermons. Church life in 17th-century Iceland was featured by the dominance of Lutheran orthodoxy. However, the number of churches diminished from about 300 to less than 200 between around 1550 and 1660.

A general fear of damnation to Hell (the main door of which was suspected to be on Mount Hekla) emerged among laymen which contributed to their adoption of a lifestyle required by the Lutheran Church. Superstition, including the belief in witchcraft and sorcery became widespread. Between 1625 and 1685, more than around 25 persons were executed on charges of witchcraft. The overwhelming majority of the victims of witch-hunt were men, which distinguishes Iceland from other parts of Europe where the number of women burned at the stake was higher. Superstition began to fade away from the last decades of the century.

King Frederick III of Denmark (1648–1670) decided to get rid of all barriers of royal power and introduce an absolute monarchy in his realms. At an extraordinary assembly, the delegates of the Alþingi of 1662 were forced to acknowledge the absolute power of the king. Bishop Brynjólfur Sveinsson of Skálholt (1639–1674) was one of the delegates who tried, in vain, to hinder the abolition of the traditional form of government.

The Icelandic Jon Thorkelsson and the Danish Ludvig Harboe, two representatives of Pietism – the 18th-century movement for religious revival – arrived in Iceland in 1741 and visited many churches. They preached against sagas and other traditional forms of Icelandic literature, but also emphasized the importance of education of children. Due to their influence, new Church regulations were introduced in 1744. They included the obligatory confirmation of children which required their ability to read by their age of 14.

As a series of natural disasters caused the loss of life of thousands of people in the 18th century, Iceland's population dropped from 50,000 to below 40,000 between 1703 and 1784. The major of these catastrophes, the so-called "Skaftá Fires" – volcanic eruptions in the Laki volcanic rifts which lasted for a year from the spring of 1783 – and the famine which followed it caused the death of more than 9,000 people in 1783 and 1784. Literature has maintained many episodes of the disaster. For instance, legend says that Jón Steingrímsson, a clergyman serving in Kirkjubæjarklaustur stopped the flowing lava just at the walls of his church by his "Fire Sermon". Bishop Hannes Finnsson of Skálholt moved to Reykjavík in 1785 because an earthquake that followed the Skaftá Fires destroyed all buildings at his see. This change of the episcopal see was declared permanent in 1796. The Diocese of Hólar and its school was abolished in 1801. Thereafter Reykjavík was the see of the sole diocese of the country.

=== National awakening (1809–1885) ===
The nineteenth century saw the beginning of a national revival in Iceland alongside a growing movement towards political independence, in which many members of the clergy played a significant part. The most consequential institutional development of the period for Church life was the granting of Iceland's own constitution in 1874, which introduced religious freedom while simultaneously affirming that the Evangelical Lutheran Church would remain the national, established church, protected and supported by the state. At the same time, the effects of rationalism were widely felt across the island during the century, and new religious currents such as spiritism and liberal theology began to gain ground alongside the dominant Lutheran tradition.

=== Towards independence (1885–1918) ===
Around the turn of the twentieth century, the legislation governing Church affairs was reformed, parish councils were established, and congregations gained the right to elect their own pastors. An active lay movement arose at approximately the same time, shaped by inner mission and pietistic currents from Denmark. In the early decades of the century, liberal theology was introduced into Iceland, generating considerable theological tension between liberal and conservative adherents.

=== Republic of Iceland (1944–) ===
Iceland’s Constitution guarantees freedom of religion while also requiring the state to support and protect the Evangelical Lutheran Church, which retains its status as the National Church.

== See also ==
- Church of Iceland
- Christianity in Iceland
