= Gissur =

Gissur or Gizur [ˈcɪsːˌʏːr̥] is an Icelandic given name, originally from Old Norse Gizurr [ˈɡit͡sˌurː]. Notable persons with that name include:

- Gizur, a King of the Geats
- Gissur Teitsson, known as Gissur the White, 11th century Icelandic chieftain
- Gissur Ísleifsson (1042–1118), second bishop of Iceland, and grandson of Gissur Teitsson
- Gissur Þorvaldsson (1208–1268), Icelandic chieftain
- Gissur Einarsson (c. 1512–1548), Icelandic bishop

== See also ==
- Gissurarson
