= Goðafoss =

Coordinates: 65°40′48″N 17°32′24″W

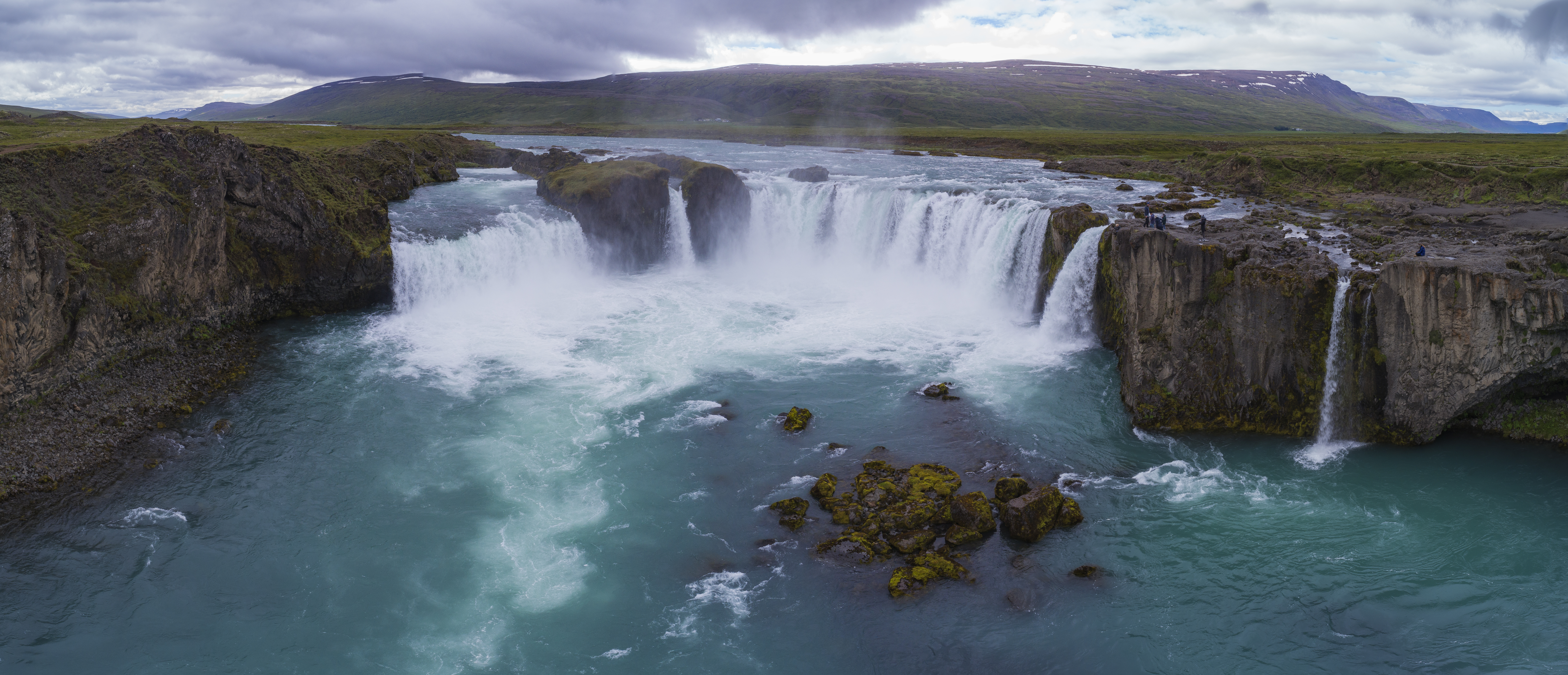
- Aerial panorama of Goðafoss
- Location: North of Iceland
- Total height: 12 m (39 ft)
- Total width: 30 m (98 ft)

Goðafoss (Icelandic pronunciation: [ˈkɔːðaˌfɔsː]) is a waterfall in northern Iceland. It is located along the country's main ring road at the junction with the Sprengisandur highland road, about 45 minutes from Akureyri. The water of the river Skjálfandafljót falls from a height of 12 metres over a width of 30 metres. A 1.8-mile hiking trail loops around the waterfall area.

== Name ==
The origin of the waterfall's name is not completely clear. In modern Icelandic, the name can be read either as "waterfall of the goð (gods)" or "waterfall of the goði (chieftain)." Linguist and placename expert Svavar Sigmundsson suggests that the name derives from two crags at the falls which resemble pagan idols. In 1879–1882, a myth was published in Denmark according to which the waterfall was named when the lawspeaker Þorgeir Ljósvetningagoði made Christianity the official religion of Iceland in the year 999 or 1000. Upon returning home from the Alþingi, Þorgeir supposedly threw his statues of the Norse gods into the waterfall. However, although the story of Þorgeir's role in the adoption of Christianity in Iceland is preserved in Ari Þorgilsson's Íslendingabók, no mention is made of Þorgeir throwing his idols into Goðafoss. The legend appears to be a nineteenth-century fabrication. Nevertheless, a window in Akureyrarkirkja, the main church at Akureyri, illustrates this story.

== Gallery ==
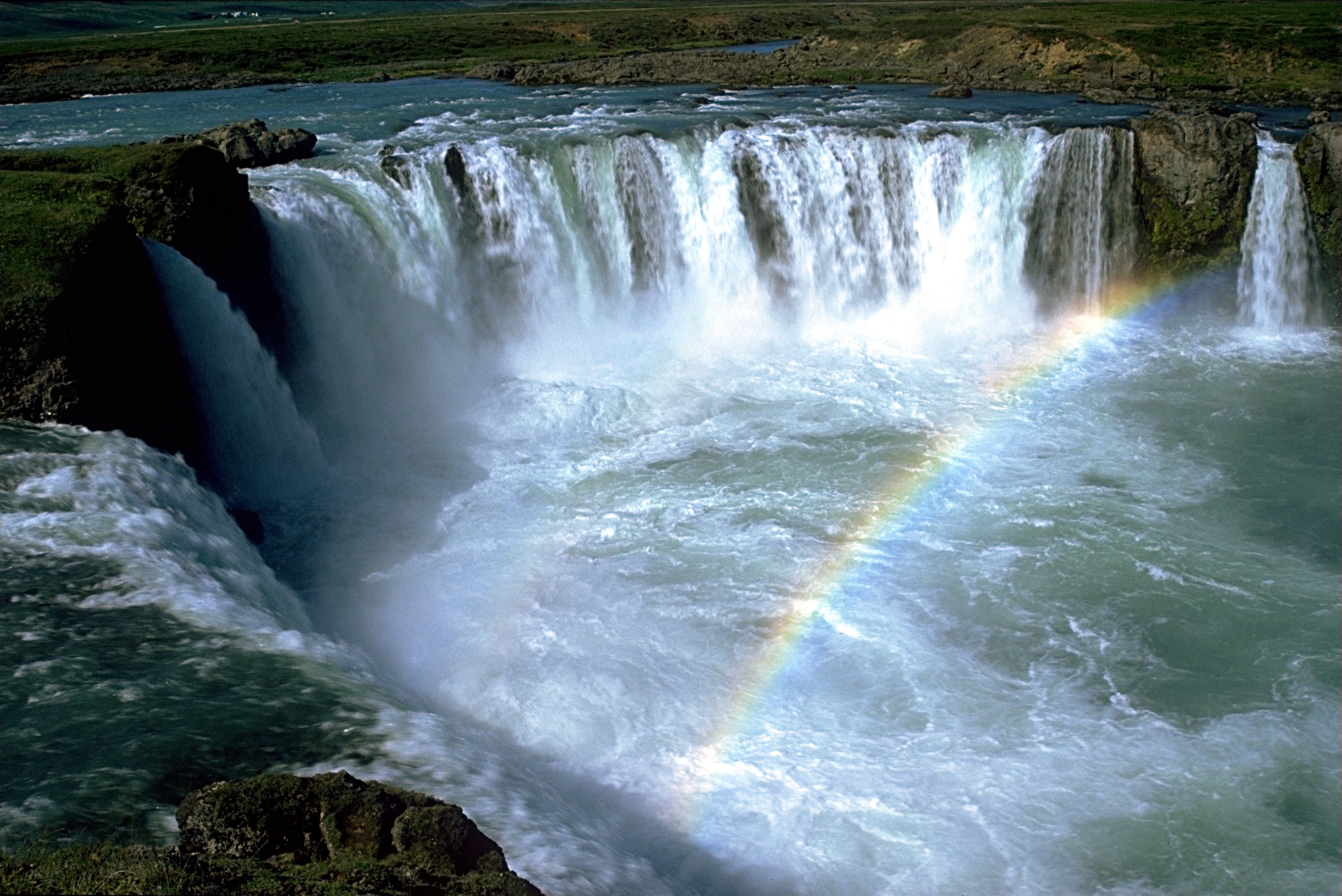
Goðafoss seen from the Eastern bank in summer

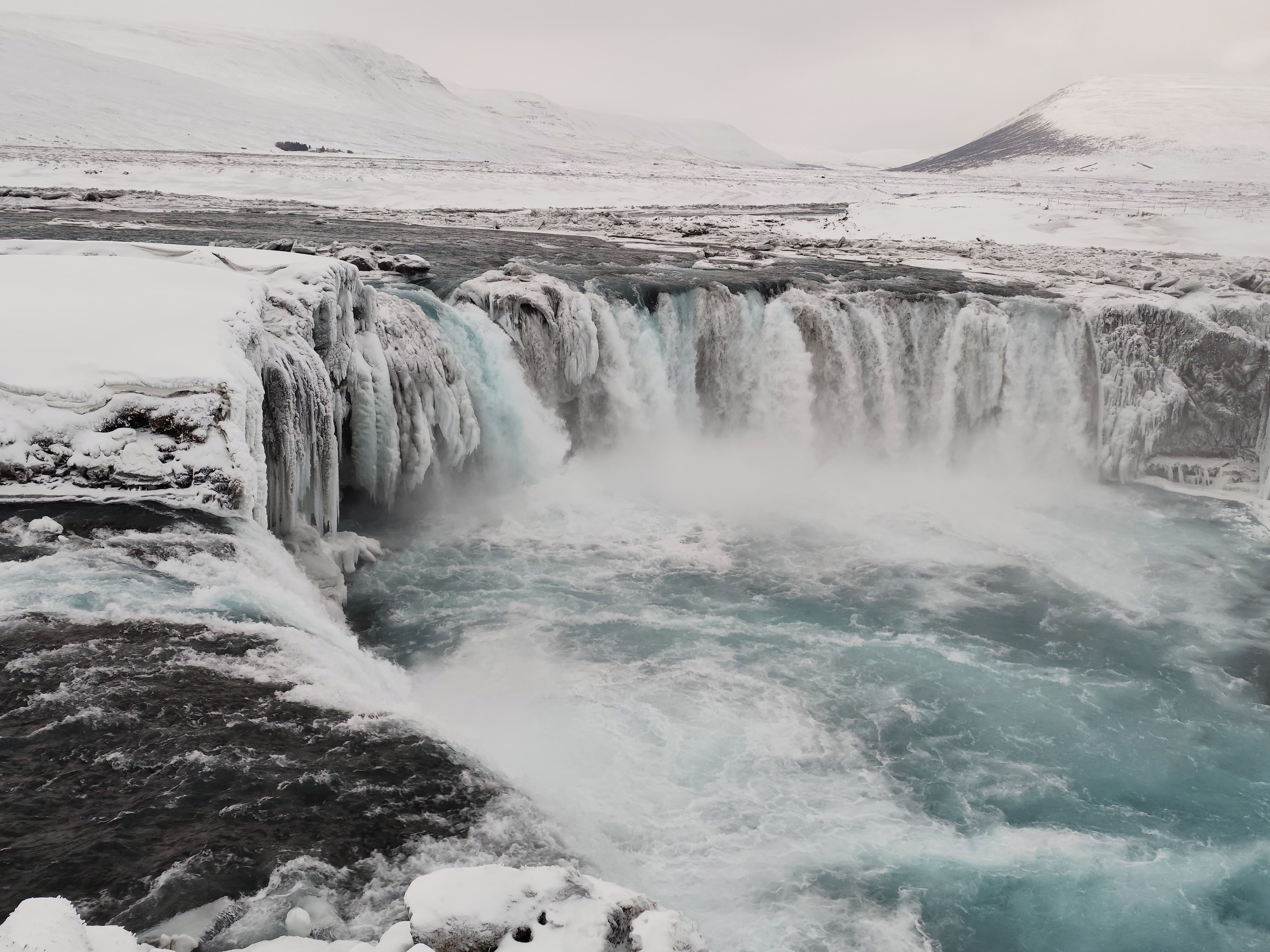
Goðafoss seen from the Eastern bank in winter

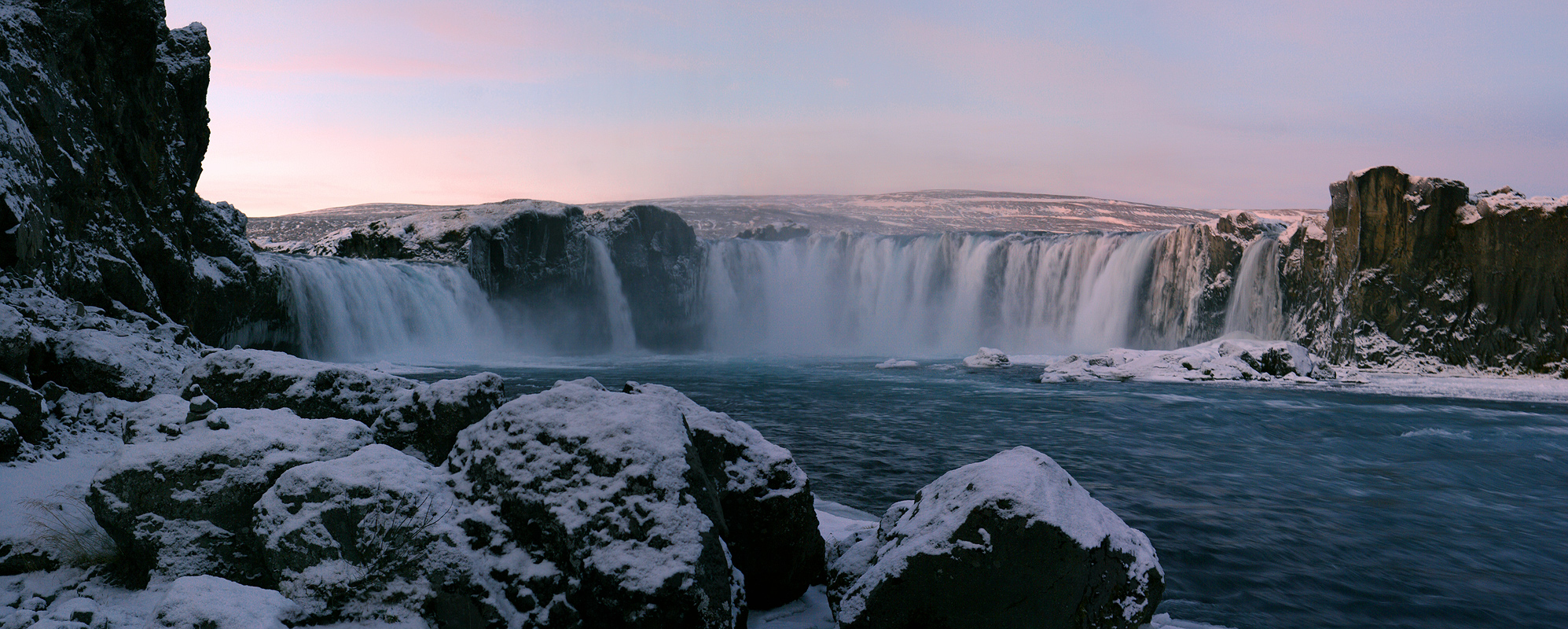
Panorama of Goðafoss in winter

== History ==
E/S Goðafoss was an Icelandic ship named after the waterfall, it was used to transport both freight and passengers. It was sunk by the German submarine U-300 in World War II, resulting in great loss of life.

In 2020, the waterfall was granted protected status.

== See also ==
- List of waterfalls
- Waterfalls of Iceland
- Christianisation of Iceland
