= Thorvald Kodransson =

Icelandic skald and Christian missionary of the 10th century

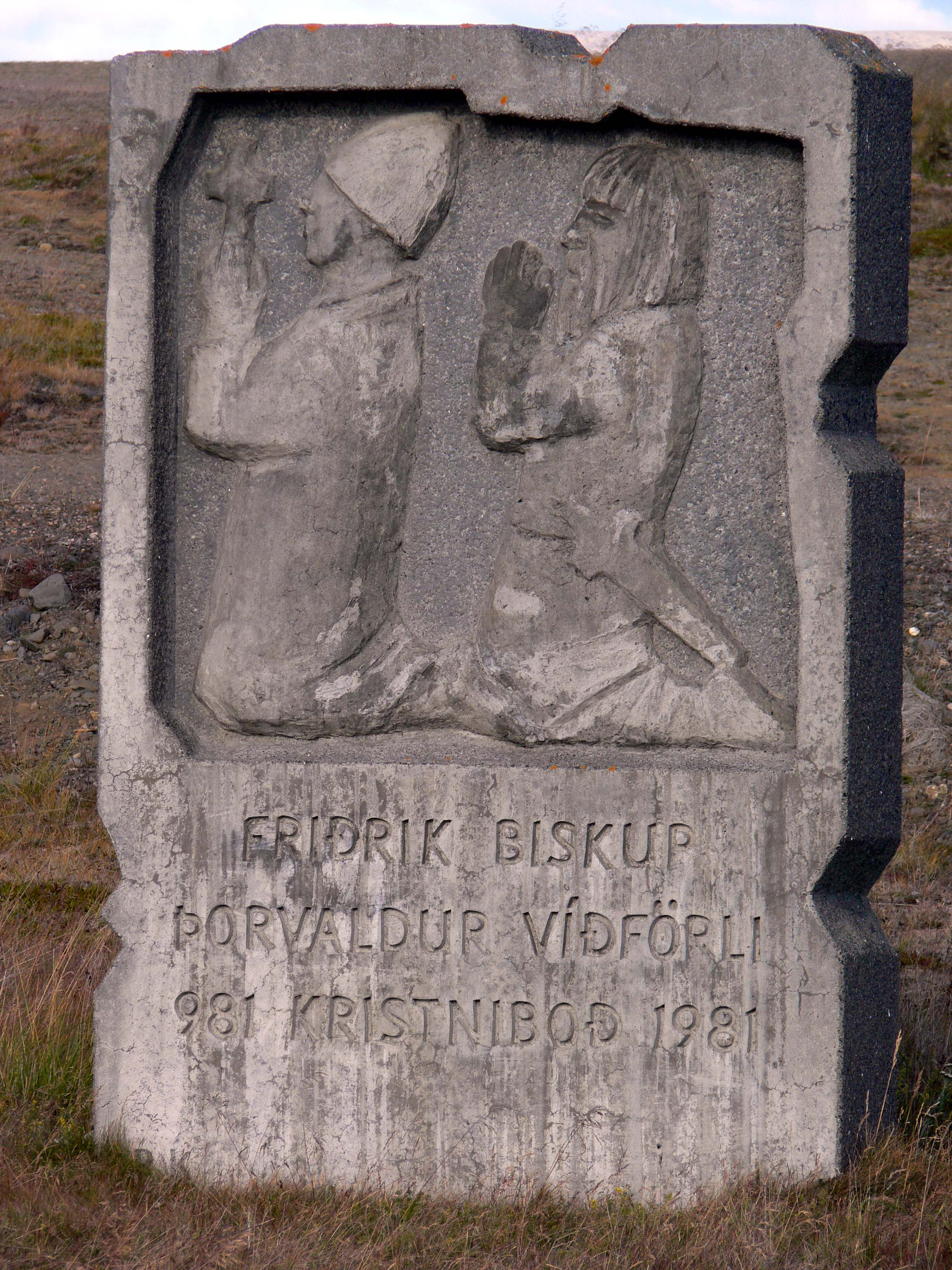
Monument to Bishop Friðrik and Þorvaldur and Friðrekr. Iceland.

Thorvald Kodransson the Far Traveller (Old Norse: Þorvaldr Koðránsson inn víðförli) was one of the first Christian missionaries in Iceland and then in Belarus in the late 10th century. He was native to Iceland but went abroad where he was baptized by one Bishop Friedrich (Friðrekr), a German. He returned to the island in Bishop Friedrich's retinue in 981. They were especially active in proselytising among the inhabitants of the northern parts of Iceland.

Thorvald allegedly was appointed by the Byzantine emperor to act as ambassador to the lands of the Rus' (Kievan Rus', Russia). He is said to have erected a cathedral or monastery of John the Baptist in the Principality of Polotsk, at the present-day Polotsk, Belarus.

== Sources ==
The account of their attempts at Christianizing Iceland is described in the Kristni saga and the "Story of Thorvald the Far Traveller" (Þorvalds þáttr víðfǫrla). The story (þáttr) constitutes a portion of the Óláfs saga Tryggvasonar en mesta, with a shorter recension found in the Flateyjarbók, but accounts given in these sources are considered historically unreliable.

The Íslendingabók (Ch. 8) records Bishop Friðrekr arriving, but furnishes no details, nor mention of Thorvald participating.

The source texts in print include the 1689 Skálholt edition of Óláfs saga Tryggvasonar, the same king's saga in the Fornmanna sögur series (1825), and Kristni saga appended with the Þáttr Þorvalds ens víðfǫrla edited by Kahle (1905).

An abridged English translation of the þáttr, "The Tale of Thorwald the Far-farer" (1905) was published by Vigfússon and Powell.

== Life ==
According to the legend, Thorvald was the unfavored son of Kodran (Koðrán) treated poorly in his upbringing, until a spaeing-woman intervened and persuaded the father that Þorvaldr will be successful man in the future, and to provide him seed money to seek fortune abroad. Þorvaldr joins the viking raids (headed by Danish king Sveinn Forkbeard) but develops an impeccable reputation by using his booty to aid the needy and even captured prisoners. Thorvald eventually meets the Frankish bishop and missionary Frederick (Friedrich, Friðrekr) in Saxony, and learns the German language, after which the clergyman suggests going to Iceland together to convert the folk there.

The sagas say that Thorvald participated in the bishop's conversion of his own father Kodran, who sacrificed or gave offerings to a certain spirit embodied in stone. The spirit (referred to as ármaðr in Kristni saga (Note: According to Kahle's annotation to the saga, ármaðr means 'servant' (German: Diener).) and called a diviner (spámann by Kodran in the Story) benefitted its worshipper by foretelling events, counseling what to do and to avoid, and guarding livestock. Kodran promised to abandon his idol and convert if it could be defeated, and the household spirit capitulated after the bishop pronounced the psalter and repeatedly (3 times) poured holy water on the stone, which seemed to scald him like hot water, and weakening him, causing the stone to split asunder according to the saga.

Otherwise, Thorvald had little success with proselytizing mostly in the northerly parts of Iceland during his repatriation, and was subjected to ridicule. The Icelanders taunted Thorvald with níð verses, suggesting he and the bishop had children together. Thorvald was involved in an altercation in which two men were killed in battle, and was expelled from the community. He and the Bishop repaired to Lækjamót (Note: In the northeastern part of Víðidalur. North of Víðidalstunga. Angicized as Lœkiameet.) where they were headquartered, but a posse was after them. After a 4-year stay there, they left Iceland for good in the year 986. They had reached Norway when Hedin (Heðinn), one of the most vociferous antagonists from Iceland caught up with them, and Thorvald ordered a slave to kill Hedin. The Bishop decided he must part ways with the unforgiving acolyte.

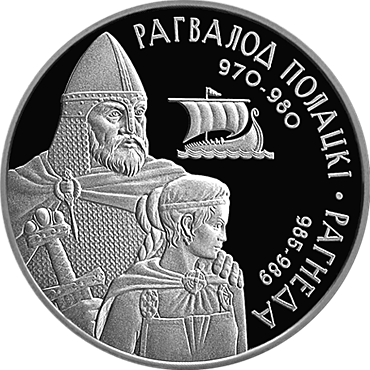
Rogvolod and Rogneda

According to the sagas, Thorvald later went to Jerusalem, then to Miklagarðr (Constantinople), where he was allegedly conferred by the Byzantine emperor (Basil II) with plenipotentiary ambassadorship over the East-Way (Austurvegr), i.e., over the kings of all of Rusland and Garðaríki (North Russia, or Kingdom of Kiev). (Note: Biskupa sögur I, 48–49, quoted by Böndal (tr. into English by Benedikz): "[Þorvaldr] held the greatest dignity in the East.. sent by the Emperor.. as a leader or governor over Russia or the Kingdom of Kiev") (Note: Óláfs saga Tryggvasonar en mesta 1: 300, apud Jakobsson (2005)) He followed the Dnieper route and reached Kænugarðr (Kiev). In the Principality of Polotsk then ruled by Rogvolod (Ragnvald), Thorvald is credited with building a cathedral or monastery dedicated to John the Baptist. (Note: Biskupa sögur I, 48–49, quoted by Böndal (tr. into English by Benedikz.) He died en route to returning, somewhere in Rus' not far from Pallteskia (Polotsk, Belarus), and was buried in the monastery. A skald named Brandr hinn viðförli ("the Far-Traveller") is quoted as singing that Thorvald's remains lie high on the "Drafni" above St. John's, (Note: Kristni saga Ch. XIII.iv , redacted with Latin translation by C. C. Rafn et al., quoted in German translation by Baetke.) where Drafni or Dröfn was the high cliff below which this monastery lay.

== See also ==
- Christianisation of Iceland
- Stefnir Thorgilsson
- Thangbrand
