= Ísleifsson =

Ísleifsson is an Icelandic patronymic surname.

== People with the surname ==
- Gissur Ísleifsson (1042–1118), Icelandic clergyman
- Ólafur Ísleifsson (born 1955), Icelandic economist and politician

== See also ==
- Leifsson
