= Leifsson =

Leifsson is a surname. Notable people with the surname include:

- Brynjar Leifsson (born 1990), guitarist in Of Monsters and Men, an indie folk/pop band from Iceland
- Guðgeir Leifsson (born 1951), Icelandic former footballer
- Gunnlaugr Leifsson (died 1218), Icelandic scholar, writer and poet
- Thorarinn Leifsson (born 1966), Icelandic author and illustrator
- Thorkell Leifsson or Leif Ericson (c. 970 – c. 1020), Norse explorer, the first European to land in North America

== See also ==
- Ísleifsson
