= Lögberg (disambiguation) =

Lögberg (or Law Rock) was the site of the Icelandic Althing parliament.

Lögberg may also refer to:

- Lögberg, the building housing the Faculty of Law at University of Iceland
- Lögberg, a North American newspaper which merged to form Lögberg-Heimskringla
