= Stefnir Thorgilsson =

Christian missionary

Stefnir Thorgilsson was one of the first Christian missionaries among the Icelanders at the end of the 10th century. He was born in Iceland. King Olaf Tryggvason, king of Norway (r. 997-1000) ordered him to return to his homeland in order to proselytize among the Icelanders. He destroyed a number of heathen temples and idols, for which he was expelled from the island.

After the destruction of the pagan shrines, the Althing reached agreement to declare Christians frændaskömm (a disgrace to kinsman). Based on this, Christians could be denounced by their own relatives. Additionally, Stefnir became an outlaw and was forced to return to Norway.

== See also ==
- Christianisation of Iceland
- Thangbrand
- Thorvald Kodransson
