= Bókasafn Ömmu Huldar =

2009 novel by Thorarinn Leifsson

Bókasafn Ömmu Huldar (literally 'Granny Huld's Library', but in the author's preferred English translation Grandmother's Library) is the third novel by the Icelandic author Þórarinn Leifsson. It won the Reykjavik Children's Book Prize in 2010 and was nominated for the Nordic Children's Book Prize in 2011 – an award given out every two years by librarians in the Nordic countries. The book was, in the assessment of Natalie M. Van Deusen, 'inspired by the recent Icelandic financial crisis'.

== Plot ==
The novel is set in Reykjavík, in a dystopian future in which the world is largely controlled by a bank called Gullbanki ('Gold Bank'). Gullbanki was once a small bank but, by speculating on uncaught fish and on land, grew, and bought up first other banks and ultimately everything in the world. Schooling is merely instrumental, the Internet has been prohibited, people are discouraged from reading, and books are largely unavailable. The protagonist's elder brother Sóli is brought into debt slavery during his teens through mobile phone bills, while parents find themselves effectively offering themselves as collateral for property purchases, and are taken away to work for Gullbanki when they default on their debts (as they inevitably do).

The novel's protagonist is Albertína Haraldsdóttir, an eleven-year-old girl whose family has, at the start of the story, recently moved into a new block of flats, Gullbúrið ('Gilded Cage'), built as part of a housing boom and characterised by impersonality, and screens in every room which cannot be switched off and which continually broadcast adverts. Gullbanki's representative at Gullbúrið is the self-important but ultimately hapless Hávar M. Grímsson, who is shown to be able to use his wealth to control the mayor of Reykjavík. It emerges that Albertína's family, having defaulted on the loans for their pleasant house, has been sent to live in the flat by Gullbanki to advertise the new block; Albertína has to spend several hours a day standing in the window dressed in a frock as a living advertisement. Albertína's brother has already been taken away by Gullbanki and both Albertína's parents and those of her friends are also seized in the earlier part of the book.

Gullbanki's power is subverted by a number of forces. One of Albertína's schoolfriends, Valgarður (Valli) veira, has perceived and explains Gullbanki's business practices. Meanwhile, Albertína teaches herself to read by inspecting instructions on bathroom products. Crucially, the witch Arnheiður Huld, Albertína's cigar-smoking great-great-grandmother on her father's side and the Granny Huld of the book's title, escapes from her old people's home at the age of 158 to join Albertína and her family in Gullbúrið. With the help of a number of dwarvish minions whom she has used her magical powers to enslave, Huld moves in her million-book library, giving Albertína and her friends access to knowledge which they work voraciously to acquire. One of the more dramatic effects of this reading is that Albertína acquires the power to breathe fire like a dragon. Valli veira plans to become a suicide bomber in a futile attempt to resist Gullbanki's power but is eventually discouraged by Huld and Albertína, who instead lead a more effective assault on Gullbanki.

Huld uses her magic to fly Gullbúrið to the space-station where Gullbanki is based, taking the opportunity to curse Hávar into becoming another of her dwarfish minions, exposing his own powerlessness in the face of Gullbanki, along with his loneliness and need for friendship. It transpires that the parents and relatives of Albertína and her friends are working in the space-station, but so engrossed are they by their pointless labours for Gullbanki, and the spurious internal competitions that characterise the business, that they are unable to spare their children any time; indeed it is later only by adopting the hollow marketing methods of Gullbanki itself that the children are able to convince them to flee the doomed space station. Eventually, Albertína is at least able to free her brother Sóli from Gullbanki's ideological grip and with him she, Huld and her friends find and face Gullbanki's director Böðvar gamli. Böðvar turns out to be an ex-boyfriend of Huld's and to have played bass in a band in which Huld herself played drums, and to have been driven to his megalomaniacal spree of financial acquisitions by bitterness at Huld's rejection of him. Eventually, Böðvar and Huld kill each other, and the children are able to engineer the evacuation of Gullbanki's space station, reuniting with their parents in Reykjavík and ushering in a new age of enlightened living.

== Illustrations ==
The book is extensively illustrated with pictures by the author.

== Publication details of the original and translations ==
- Þórarinn Leifsson, Bókasafn ömmu Huldar (Reykjavík: Mál og menning, 2009), ISBN 9789979330844; 9979330848 (Icelandic)
- Thórarinn Leifsson, Bedstemor Huldas bibliotek, trans. by Birgir Thor Møller (Hedehusene: Torgard, 2010), ISBN 9788792286222; 8792286224 (Danish)
- Þórarinn Leifsson, Bestemor Hulds bibliotek, trans. by Tone Myklebost ([Stamsund]: Orkana, 2012) (Norwegian)
- Thorarinn Leifsson, Vanaema Huldi raamatukogu (NyNorden, 2013), ISBN 9789949919369 (Estonian)
- Thórarinn Leifsson, La folle biblioteca di nonna Huld, trans. by Silvia Cosimini (Milano: Salani, 2015), ISBN 9788867154012
