= Hjalti Skeggiason =

Icelandic explorer

Hjalti Skeggiason (Old Norse and Modern Icelandic: Hjalti Skeggjason; O.N. pronunciation: [ˈhjɑlte ˈskeɡːjɑˌson]; M.I. pron.: [ˈçal̥tɪ ˈscɛcːaˌsɔːn]) was an Icelandic chieftain who supported Gizurr the White for the introduction of Christianity in Iceland, on the Althing in 1000.

Later he spent time with the Norwegian king Olaf the Stout and accompanied Björn Stallare on his diplomatic mission to Ragnvald Ulfsson in Västergötland and to Olof Skötkonung in Uppsala.

Snorri Sturluson's detailed account of this voyage is probably based on an account made by Hjalti after his return to Iceland.

== Sources ==
- An article in Nordisk familjebok
