= Þangbrandr =

10th-century Christian missionary

Þangbrandr was a missionary sent to Iceland by king of Norway Óláfr Tryggvason to convert the inhabitants to Christianity. Snorri Sturluson described him as follows:

There was a Saxon priest in [Olaf's] house who was called Thangbrand, a passionate, ungovernable man, and a great manslayer; but he was a good scholar, and a clever man.

—King Olaf Trygvason's Saga (80), Laing's translation

== Origins ==
Þangbrandr's origins are uncertain. In no less than two Icelandic sagas, he is the son of an otherwise unknown Vilbaldus, count of Saxony or of Bremen. In contrast, 12th-century Norwegian historian Theodoric the Monk presents him as Flemish. He may have been a clerk to the bishop of Bremen. However that may be, his name seems to be of German origin, and may come from Old High German *Dankbrant.

== Encounter with Óláfr ==
The Bishop of Bremen was invited to England by the Archbishop of Canterbury, and Þangbrandr went with him. In England, Þangbrandr was offered a shield with a crucified Christ drawn on it. When they returned to Saxony they met Óláfr, who saw Þangbrandr's shield and was pleased with it. The Þangbrandr gave Óláfr the shield and, in return, the king promised to help and protect him in case he would need it.

== Mission in Norway ==
After fighting over a woman with one of the Emperor's men and killing him, Þangbrandr was forced to flee from the land. He joined Óláfr in England, who took him into his service. When Óláfr came back in Norway, Þangbrandr was put in charge of baptizing the people in Hordaland. But he soon fell short of money and began to rob those who were still pagans.

== Mission in Iceland ==
As a penance, Óláfr sent him to Iceland, where Þorvaldr Kodránsson and Stefnir Þórgilsson's missions had failed.

Þangbrandr's mission began in 997. He first succeeded in converting Sídu-Hallr Þorsteinsson. He travelled around the country and several other prominent Icelanders agreed to be baptized or at least to receive prima signatio. But he had more opponents than followers. The difficulties he came up against are especially described in Brennu-Njáls saga in a "lively, although probably exaggerated" manner. He was challenged to a duel by Þorkell, whom he defeated, although he carried a crucifix rather than a shield. Some of his enemies paid a sorcerer to get rid of him. The sorcerer made a sacrifice and the ground opened up under Þangbrandr. His horse was swallowed up but he escaped. The priest killed the skald Vetrliði Sumarliðason who had composed defamatory verses (níð) about him. He also killed another skald, Þorvaldr veili, who had gathered a troop to slay him. Steinunn, Hofgarða-Refr's mother, preached the old faith to him, trying to demonstrate the superiority of Thor over Christ ("Hast thou heard," she said, "how Thor challenged Christ to single combat, and how he did not dare to fight with Thor?"). Þangbrandr then caused the death of a berserker. He was eventually outlawed because of the men he had killed.

After two years in Iceland, he went back to Norway and explained he had failed:

Thangbrand the priest came back from Iceland to King Olaf, and told the ill success of his journey; namely, that the Icelanders had made lampoons about him; and that some even sought to kill him, and there was little hope of that country ever being made Christian.

—King Olaf Trygvason's Saga (91), Laing's translation

When Óláfr learned that, he got angry and threatened to hurt or kill all the pagan Icelanders who were in town at that time. But Gizurr the White Teitsson and Hjalti Skeggjason, who had been converted by Þangbrandr, talked him out of it. They explained that Þangbrandr had failed because he had proceeded with violence and murders and they committed themselves to preaching Christian faith in Iceland. The conversion of Iceland was eventually decided at the next Alþing (in 999 or 1000—see Christianisation of Iceland).

== Sources ==
=== Primary sources ===
- Brennu-Njáls saga
- Ari Þorgilsson's Íslendingabók
- Kristni saga
- Landnámabók
- Laxdœla saga
- Óláfs saga Tryggvasonar en mesta
- Laing, Samuel (trans.). Anderson, Rasmus B. (revision and notes). Snorre Sturlason: The Heimskringla: A History of the Norse Kings. London: Norrœna Society, 1906.
- McDougall, David and Ian (trans. and notes). Foote, Peter (intro.). 1998. Theodoricus monachus: Historia de antiquitate regum Norwagiensium. An Account of the Ancient History of the Norwegian Kings. London: Viking Society for Northern Research. ISBN 0-903521-40-7.

=== Secondary sources ===
- Byock, Jesse L. Viking Age Iceland. London: Penguin books, 2001. ISBN 0-14-029115-6.
