= Þorvaldr veili =

Þorvaldr (inn) veili ("the Ailing") was an Icelandic skald who lived in the last part of the 10th century.

The Brennu-Njáls saga relates the circumstances of his death. Þorvaldr was pagan and opposed the conversion to Christianity. According especially to Snorri Sturluson's Ólafs saga Tryggvasonar, he had composed defamatory verses (níð) about Þangbrandr, a missionary sent to Iceland by Óláfr Tryggvason. When Þangbrandr arrived in his area, in Grímsnes, Þorvaldr gathered a troop to slay him and his companion Guðleifr Arason. But the priest was forewarned and Þorvaldr was eventually killed:

Thangbrand shot a spear through Thorwald, but Gudleif smote him on the shoulder and hewed his arm off, and that was his death.

—The Story of Burnt Njal (98), Dasent's translation

As he was setting his trap, Þorvaldr had asked the skald Úlfr Uggason to lend him assistance against the "effeminate/sodomitic wolf to the [pagan] gods" (argr goðvargr), but Úlfr refused to be involved. This request, which takes the form of a lausavísa, is all that survives of his work. But according to Snorri's Háttatal, he was also the author of a drápa about the story of Sigurðr. This drápa was remarkable for being refrainless (steflaus) and composed in a variant of skjálfhent.
