= Gissurarson =

Gissurarson [ˈcɪsːˌʏːrarˌsɔːn] is a surname of Icelandic origin, meaning son of Gissur. In Icelandic names, the last name is not a family name but a patronymic. The name refers to:

- Hannes Hólmsteinn Gissurarson (b. 1953), Icelandic professor of political scientist and commentator
- Ísleifur Gissurarson (1006–1080), Icelandic clergyman; first bishop of Iceland following the Christianization of Iceland
- Magnús Gissurarson (1175–1236), Icelandic Roman Catholic clergyman; bishop of Iceland 1216–37
