= Thorgeir Ljosvetningagodi =

Icelandic lawspeaker

Thorgeir Ljosvetningagodi Thorkelsson (Old Norse: Þorgeirr Ljósvetningagoði Þorkelsson [ˈθorˌɡɛirː ˈljoːsˌwetneŋɡɑˌɡoðe ˈθorˌkelsˌson]; Modern Icelandic: Þorgeir ... [ˈθɔrˌceir ˈljousˌvɛhtniŋkaˌkɔːðɪ ˈθɔrˌcʰɛlsˌsɔːn]; born c. 940) was an Icelandic jurist who served as a lawspeaker in Iceland's Althing from 985 to 1001.

In the year 999 or 1000, Iceland's legislative assembly was debating which religion they should practice: Norse paganism or Christianity. At this point, the population of Icelandic Christians had grown, though paganism still held the majority. Hallur of Sída, the lawspeaker on behalf of the Christians, left the decision to be made by Thorgeir. Thorgeir, himself a pagan priest and chieftain (a gothi), decided in favour of Christianity after a day and a night of silent meditation under a fur blanket, thus averting potentially disastrous civil conflict. Under the compromise, pagans could still practice their religion in private and several of the old customs were retained. After his decision, Thorgeir himself converted to Christianity. Thorgeir's story is preserved in Ari Thorgilsson's Íslendingabók.

Yoav Tirosh, in his dissertation On the Receiving End, states that Thorgeir was paid three marks of silver by the Christian lawspeaker, and it is unclear whether this was a bribe.

According to legend, the Goðafoss waterfall derived its name after Thorgeir threw his statues of the Norse gods into the waterfall following his decision. However, this story is false and appears to have originated in the 1800s.
