= Thorarinn Leifsson =

Icelandic Author, Illustrator and Tour guide (born 1966)

Thórarinn Leifsson
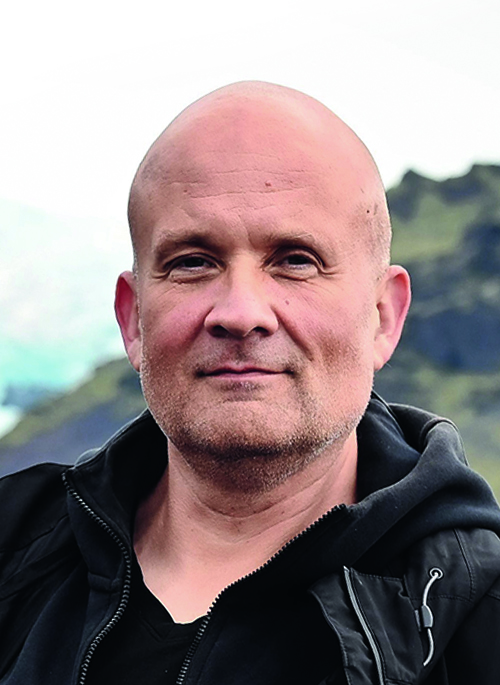
- Þórarinn Leifsson in Skaftafell, 2022.
- Born: 29 July 1966 (age 59); Reykjavík, Iceland
- Occupations: Author, Illustrator and Tour guide
- Known for: Great-Grandad and the Vanishing Glacier, Killing Tourists, The Man Who Hated Children.
- Website: www.totil.com

Thórarinn Leifsson (born 29 July 1966) is an Icelandic author, illustrator and tour guide. He graduated from the Icelandic Academy of Arts in 1989. In that same period he was a street painter in western Europe.

Thórarinn Leifsson worked as an illustrator and web designer before making his literary debut with Father’s Big Secret in 2007 – a dark tale for children about a cannibal father and his complicated relationship with his children.

In 2009 Thórarinn published Grandmother's Library, a story inspired by the Icelandic bank crisis of 2008. The book was awarded the Reykjavík Children Books Prize in 2010 and nominated for the Nordic Children's Book Prize in 2011 – an award given out every two years by librarians in the Nordic countries.

In 2001 Thórarinn published an autobiographical novel called The Street Painter, based on his experiences as a vagabond in southern Spain and Morocco in the late eighties.

The Man Who Hated Children, was published in the autumn of 2014 and nominated for The Nordic Council Children and Young People's Literature Prize in 2015. The setting is a twisted present-day Reykjavík with elements of crime fiction in the storyline. Film rights were acquired by The Icelandic Film Company. Shooting is expected to start in the summer of 2025. The Man Who Hated Children was also nominated for The Icelandic Literary Prize.

‘'Kaldakol'’, The evacuation of Iceland, was published in 2017. A fictional scenario, though upon closer scrutiny it corresponded with contemporary Iceland in many respects.

‘'Killing Tourists'’ was published in 2017. A second novel in the series will come out in 2025 and both books will be available in English that same year.

‘'Great-Grandad and the Vanishing Glacier'’, published in 2023, marks the author's return to his roots in illustrated books for younger audiences. Its a story about the impact of climate change on the Icelandic landscape. The author describes how his great-grandfather made a hazardous journey with ten horses over a glacier that has, in our time, disappeared completely.

The rights to Thórarinn Leifsson's books are now managed by the author himself and have so far been sold to Germany, Denmark, Norway, Faroe Islands, Finland, Estonia, Italy, Brazil, Hungary and Turkey.

== Personal life ==
Thórarinn currently lives in Reykjavík. He has two children; Leifur Ottó born in 2011, and Salvor born in 1992.
