= Gissur Teitsson =

Icelandic nobleman

Gissur Teitsson (Old Norse: Gizurr Teitsson [ˈɟɪtˌsʊrː ˈtʰɛitsˌsɔn]; Modern Icelandic: [ˈcɪsːʏr ˈtʰeitsɔn]) or Gissur the White was a chieftain or goði in Iceland at the turn of the 10th and 11th centuries. He played a preeminent role in the Christianisation of Iceland.

He was the father of Ísleifur Gissurarson and the grandfather of Gissur Ísleifsson, who served as the first two bishops of Iceland.
