= Lögberg =

UNESCO World Heritage Site, of the Icelandic parliament before the 14th century

Coordinates: 64.2596°N 21.1227°W

Lögberg (Icelandic pronunciation: [ˈlœɣˌpɛrk], Old Norse lǫgberg, Old Norse pronunciation: [ˈlɒɣˌberɣ]), or Law Rock, was a rocky outcrop in south west Iceland, at the location for the assembly of the country's Althing parliament. The original Althing was gathered at Þingvellir, an area of dramatic landscapes which was easily accessible from the populated areas of the south west.

The exact location of the Lögberg is unknown, because of the changing geography of the rift valley over 1000 years. Two possible locations have been identified in Þingvellir, one a flat ledge at the top of a slope named Hallurinn (currently marked by a flagpole), the other in the Almannagjá fault against a rock wall. A site in the Hestagjá ravine has been put forward as ideal.

The Lögberg was the place on which the Lawspeaker (Icelandic lögsögumaður [ˈlœɣˌsœːɣʏˌmaːðʏr̥], Old Norse: lǫgsǫgumaðr [lɒɣsɒɣʊmaðr̩]) took his seat as the presiding official of the assembly of the Althing. Speeches and announcements were made from the spot. Anyone attending could make their argument from the Lögberg. The gatherings were also convened and dissolved from it.

The Lögberg performed its purpose from the formation of the parliament in 930. It ceased to be used in 1262, when Iceland took allegiance to Norway.

== Gallery ==
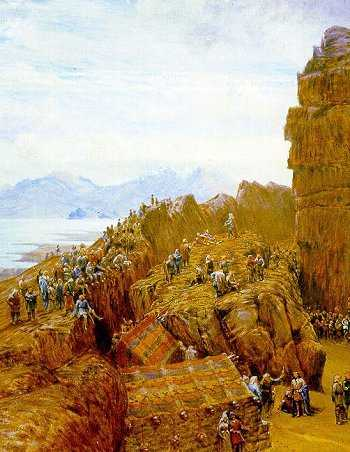
19th-century rendering of the Law Rock in Þingvellir

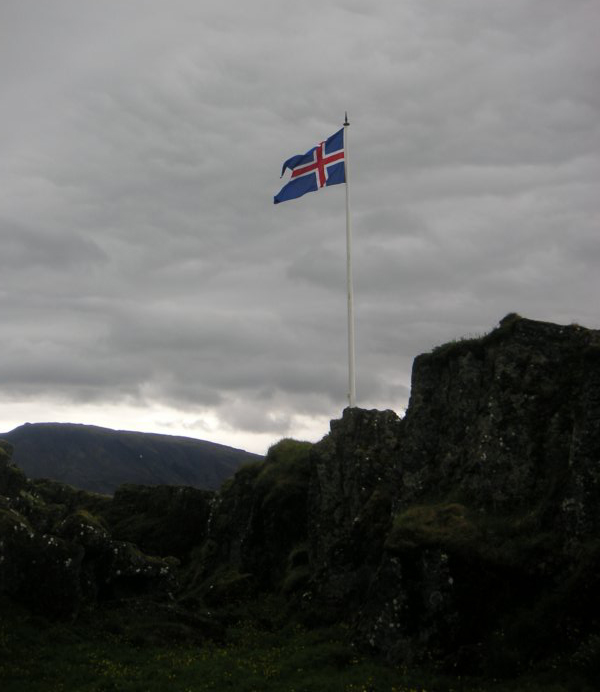
The site of the Law Rock in modern Þingvellir

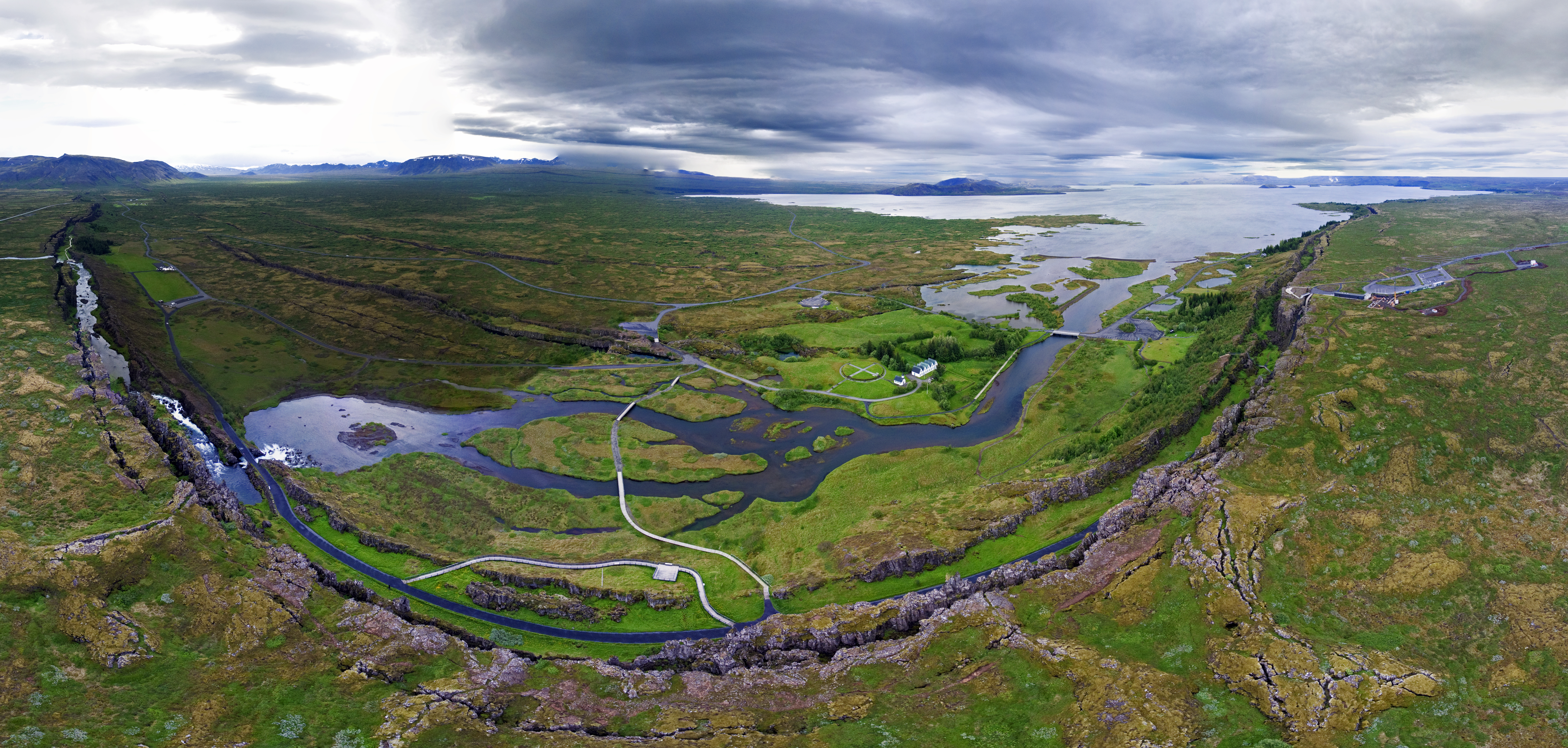
Alþingi Lögberg aerial panorama, taken in June 2017

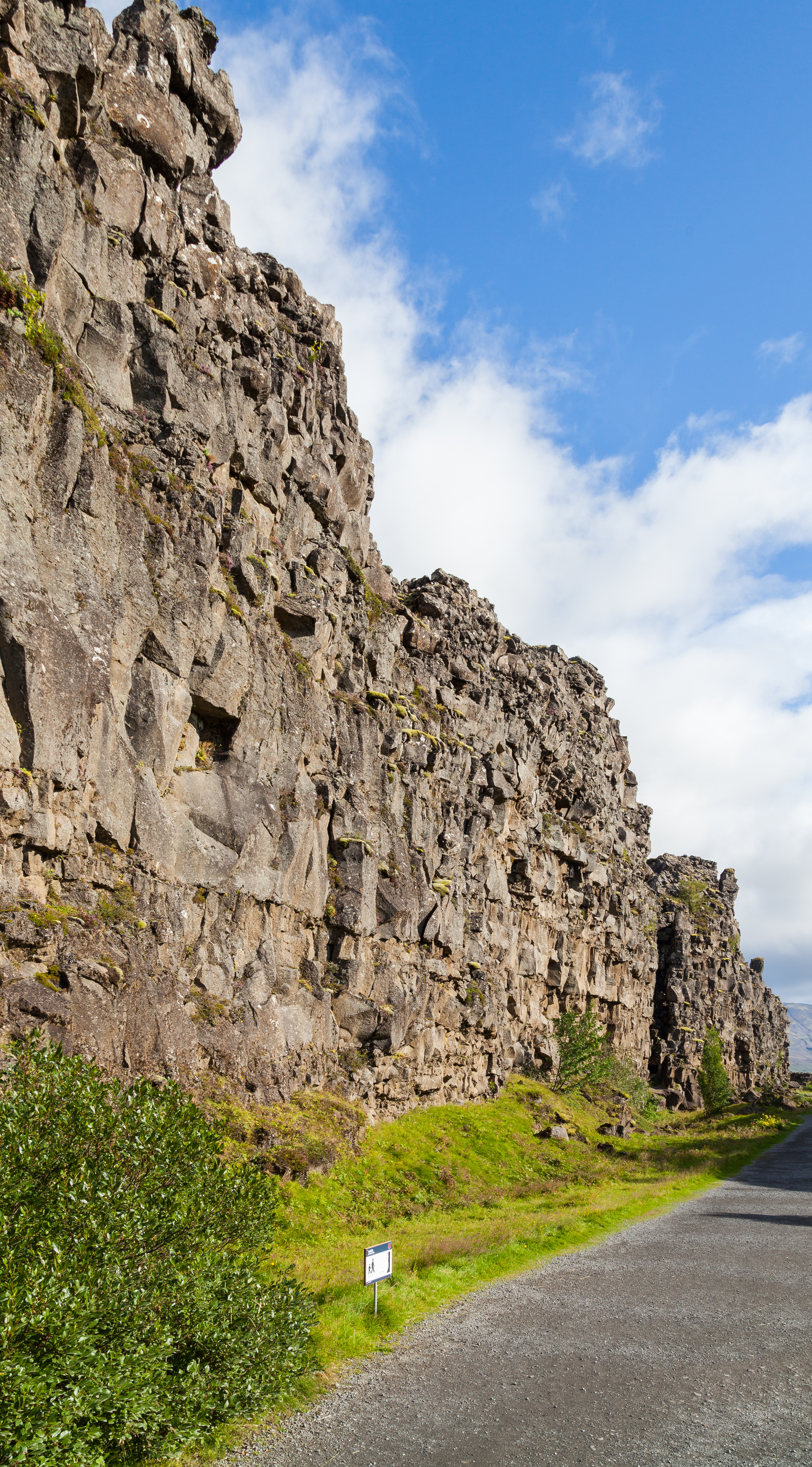
Detail view (2016)
