= Íslendingabók =

Historical work by Ari Þorgilsson

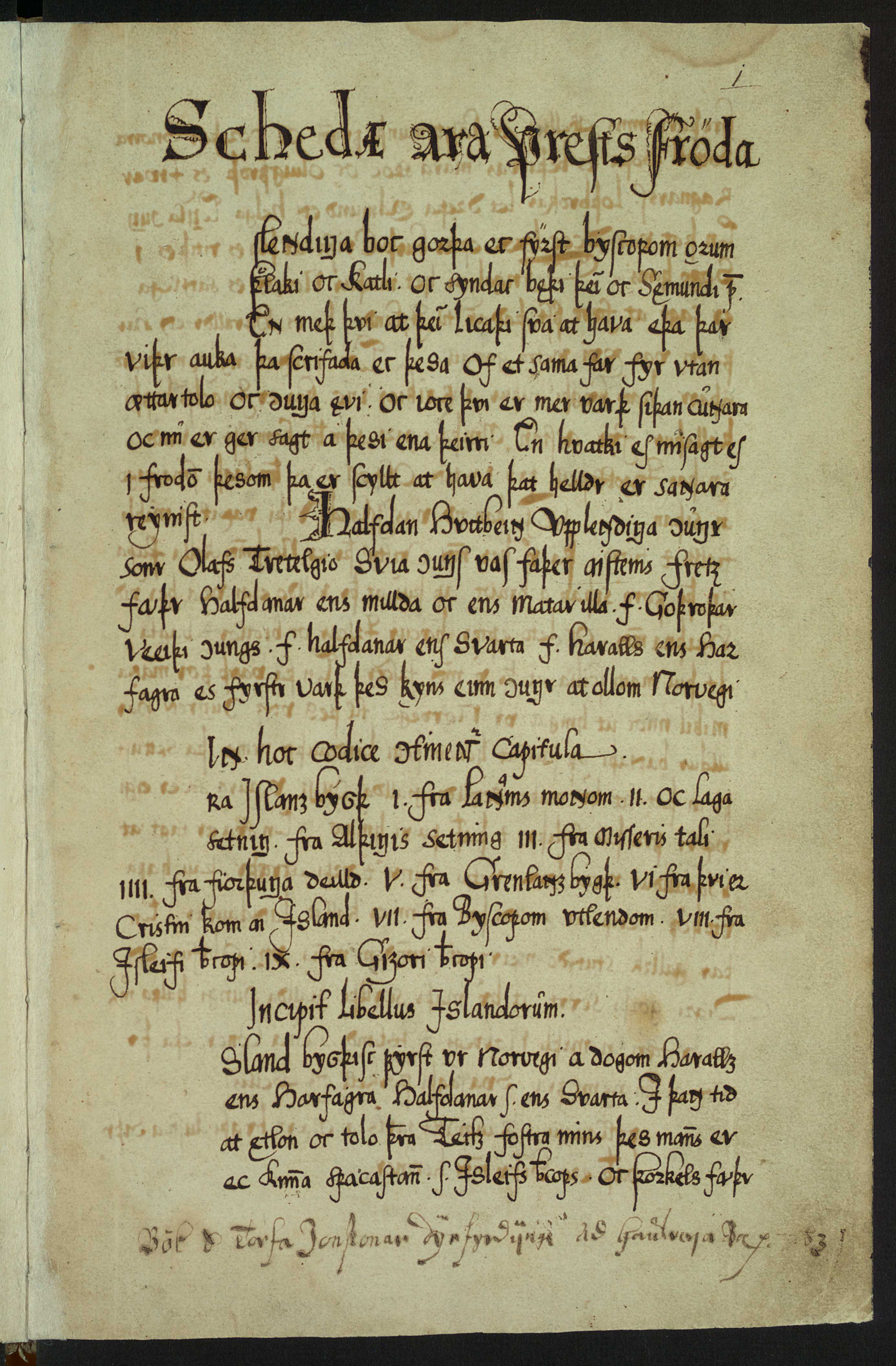
The Íslendingabók

Íslendingabók (Icelandic pronunciation: [ˈistlɛntiŋkaˌpouːk], Old Norse pronunciation: [ˈiːslɛndɪŋɡaˌboːk], lit. 'Book of Icelanders'; Latin: Libellus Islandorum) is a historical work dealing with early Icelandic history. The author was an Icelandic priest, Ari Þorgilsson, working in the early 12th century. The work originally existed in two different versions but only the younger one has survived. The older contained information on Norwegian kings, made use of by later writers of kings' sagas.

== Manuscripts and dating ==
Íslendingabók is preserved in two paper manuscripts from the seventeenth century, AM 113 a fol. (B) and AM 113 b fol. (A), which have been used as the basis for all modern print editions and are currently housed at the Árni Magnússon Institute for Icelandic Studies in Reykjavík. The two manuscripts are copies made by the priest Jón Erlendsson in Villingaholt (died 1672) at the behest of bishop Brynjólfur Sveinsson using the same exemplar. The latter of the two was made because the bishop was unhappy with the first version, which can be dated to 1651. The exemplar, likely a medieval manuscript dating from c.1200, was apparently lost in the course of the late 17th century, and when Árni Magnússon looked for it, it had disappeared without a trace. Because of certain references in the prologue to Bishops Þorlákur Runólfsson (1118–33) and Ketill Þorsteinsson (1122–45), scholars commonly date Íslendingabók to the period from 1122 to 1133.

== Style and sources ==
Íslendingabók is a concise work which relates the major events of Icelandic history in terse prose. While the author is forced to rely almost exclusively on oral tradition, he takes pains to establish the reliability of his sources and mentions several of them by name. He avoids supernatural material and Christian bias. The prologue of the book explicitly states that whatever might be wrong in the account must be corrected to "that which can be proven to be most true". Due to these qualities of the work and the early time of its writing, historians consider it the most reliable extant source on early Icelandic history.

== Content ==
Apart from a prologue and a genealogy at the end, Íslendingabók is split into ten short chapters.

=== 1. Settlement of Iceland ===
Iceland is settled in the days of Harald I of Norway by immigrants from Norway. The first settler, Ingólfur Arnarson, arrives in Reykjavík. When the first settlers arrive Iceland is said to be forested "from the coast to the mountains".

=== 2. Bringing of laws from Norway ===
When Iceland had largely been settled a man named Úlfljótr becomes the first man to bring laws there from Norway. Another man, Grímr Goatshoe (or possibly Goatbeard), investigates all of Iceland before Alþingi (Parliament) can be established. Ari's text is somewhat unclear here. Presumably Grímr explored the country to find a good meeting place.

=== 3. Establishment of Alþingi ===
The Alþingi is established on Þingvellir, which becomes public property - it was confiscated from a man who had killed a slave. After 60 years, the settlement of Iceland is complete. Ulfljótr becomes the first Lawspeaker.

=== 4. Fixing of the calendar ===
The wisest men of Iceland notice that the calendar is slowly moving out of sync with the seasons. The problem lies in the fact that the calendar in use had 52 weeks to the year, only 364 days. As people come to the conclusion that something like a day is missing they are still reluctant to use a year which doesn't contain a whole number of weeks. A man named Þorsteinn surtr comes up with an ingenious solution - a whole week should be added once every seven years. The proposal is enacted into law by the assembly around 955.

=== 5. Partition of Iceland into judicial quadrants ===
The system of ad hoc local judicial assemblies becomes unwieldy and a need is felt for standardization. A man named Þórðr gellir describes to Alþingi his recent difficulties in prosecuting a certain case in a local assembly. He suggests that the country should be split into judicial quadrants, each of which should contain three assemblies. Each quadrant, then, should contain a special assembly for appeals. The motion passes with the amendment that the northern quadrant should have four assemblies, since the northerners couldn't agree on any three.

=== 6. Discovery and settlement of Greenland ===
Greenland is discovered and settled from Iceland around 985. Erik the Red gave the country its pleasant name to encourage people to move there. The Norse settlers find remnants of previous human habitation and deduce that the people who lived there were related to the skrælingjar of Vínland.

=== 7. Conversion of Iceland to Christianity ===
King Olaf I of Norway sends the missionary priest Þangbrandr to Iceland to convert the inhabitants to Christianity. He has some success in baptizing chieftains but also meets opposition and ends up killing two or three men who had composed libellous poetry about him. He returns to Norway after one or two years with a litany of complaints and tells the king that he has little hope that the country can be converted. The king is furious at hearing the news and threatens to hurt or kill Icelanders in Norway. Two of the Icelandic chieftains previously converted by Þangbrandr meet with the king and pledge their aid in converting the country.

In the summer of 999 or 1000 the issue of religion reaches a crisis point at the Alþingi. The Christian faction and the pagan faction do not want to share the same laws and the Christians choose a new lawspeaker for themselves, Hallr á Síðu. He reaches an agreement with Þorgeirr Ljósvetningagoði, the pagan lawspeaker, that Þorgeirr will find a compromise acceptable to everyone.

Þorgeirr goes to his camp and stays under a skin for the remainder of the day and the following night. The day after he gives a speech at Lögberg. He says that the only way to maintain peace in the country is for everyone to keep to the same laws and the same religion.

Þat mon verða satt, es vér slítum í sundr lǫgin, at vér monum slíta ok friðinn.

"It will prove true that if we tear apart the laws we will also tear apart the peace."

Before reciting the compromise he has come up with Þorgeirr gets his audience to pledge themselves to a solution with one set of laws for all the country. Þorgeirr then decrees that everyone not already baptized must convert to Christianity. Three concessions are made to the pagans.

1. The old laws allowing exposure of newborn children will remain in force.
2. The old laws on the eating of horsemeat will remain in force.
3. People can make pagan sacrifices in private.

Some years later those concessions are abolished.

=== Genealogy ===
The genealogy at the end of the book was a langfedgatal.
