= Ísleifur Gissurarson =

First bishop of Iceland

Ísleifur Gissurarson (c. 1006 – 5 July 1080), an Icelandic clergyman, became the first bishop of Iceland, following the adoption of Christianity in 1000 AD.

His parents were Gissur Teitsson and Þórdís Þóroddsdóttir. After studying in Herford in Germany, he was made bishop of Iceland in 1056 by Athelbjart, archbishop of Bremen. He built up a see in his family homestead in Skálholt and founded a school. One of his students was Jón Ögmundarson (1052–1121), who later became the first bishop in Hólar. Ísleifur served as bishop for 24 years, until his death. His wife was Dalla Þorvaldsdóttir and they had three sons: Þorvaldur, Teitur and Gissur, the latter taking over as bishop after his father's death in 1080.

== Other sources ==
- Sauser, Ekkart (2001). Biographisch-Bibliographisches Kirchenlexikon (BBKL) (in German). Herzberg: Bautz. p. 704. ISBN 3-88309-086-7.

Preceded by —	Bishop of Skálholt; 1056–1080	Succeeded by Gissur Ísleifsson
