= Gissur Ísleifsson =

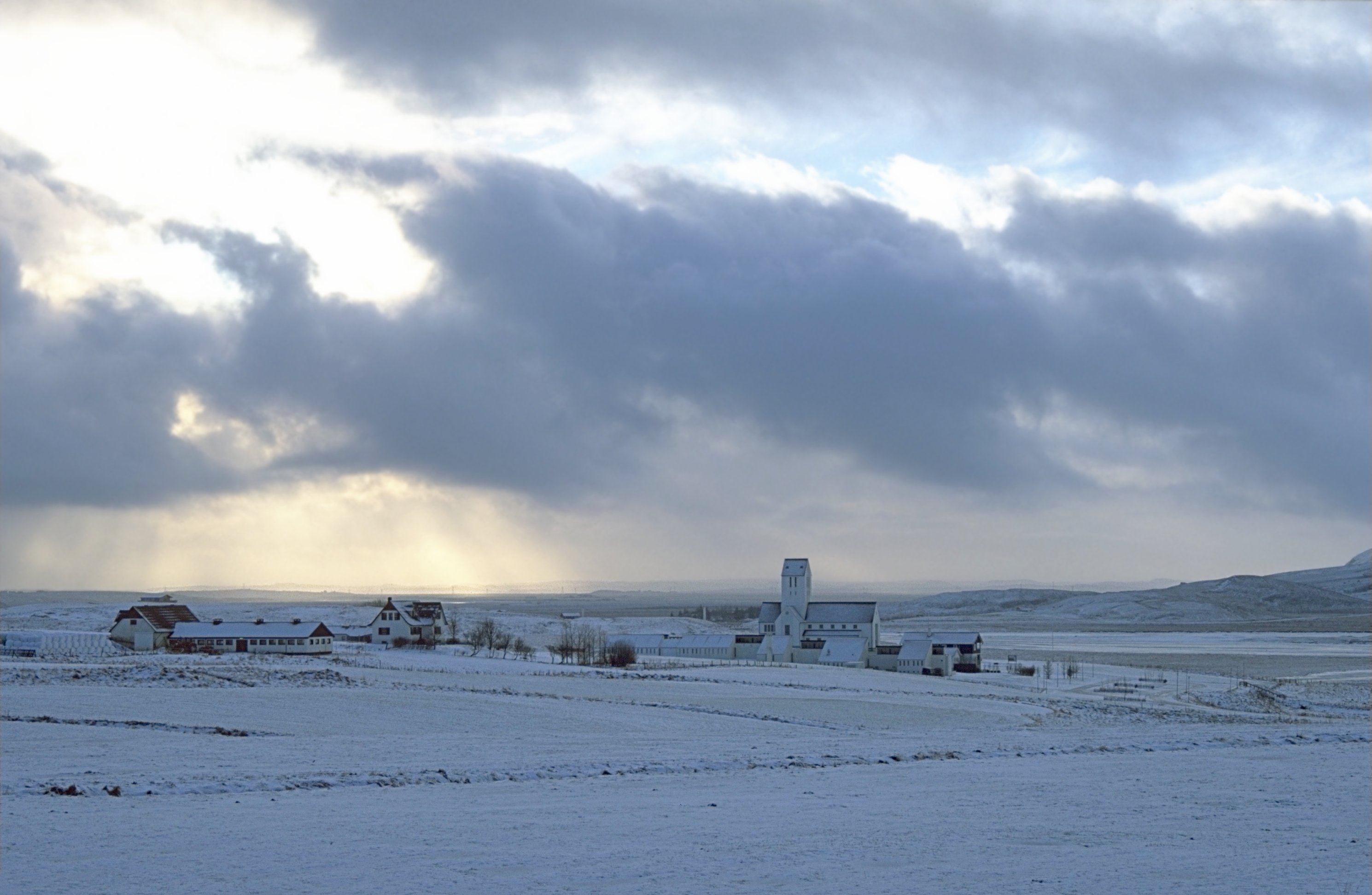
Gissur Ísleifsson served in the diocese of Skálholt

Gissur Ísleifsson (c. 1042–1118; Modern Icelandic: [ˈcɪsːˌʏːr ˈisˌleifsˌsɔːn]; Old Norse: Gizurr Ísleifsson [ˈɡit͡sˌurː ˈiːsˌlɛivsˌson]) was an Icelandic clergyman who, in 1082, became the second Catholic bishop of Iceland in the aftermath of the adoption of Christianity by the island's inhabitants. He followed in the footsteps of his father, Ísleifur Gissurarson (1006–1080), Iceland's first bishop, who established the initial episcopal see at the family homestead in Skálholt and served from 1056 until his death in 1080, Gissur Ísleifsson continued his mission at Skálholt for the next 36 years, with his own death coming in the year 1118.

== See also ==
- List of Skálholt bishops

Preceded by Ísleifur Gissurarson	Bishop of Skálholt; 1082–1118	Succeeded by Þorlákur Runólfsson
