= Ari Thorgilsson =

Icelandic medieval chronicler (1067–1148)

- Born: 1067 or 1068
- Died: 9 November 1148
- Other name: Ari the Wise
- Occupation: Chronicler

Ari Þorgilsson (1067/1068 – 9 November 1148; Old Norse: [ˈɑre ˈθorˌɡilsˌson]; Modern Icelandic: [ˈaːrɪ ˈθɔrˌcɪlsˌsɔːn]; also anglicized Ari Thorgilsson) was Iceland's most prominent medieval chronicler. He was the author of Íslendingabók, which details the histories of the various families who settled Iceland. He is typically referred to as Ari the Wise (Ari fróði), and according to Snorri Sturluson was the first to write history in Old Norse.

Ari was a part of the Haukdælir family clan and studied in the school in Haukadalur as a student of Teitur Ísleifsson (the son of Ísleifur Gissurarson, first bishop of Iceland). There he became acquainted with Classical education. His writings clearly indicate that he was familiar with Latin chronicler traditions, but at the same time he is widely regarded as excelling in the Icelandic oral storytelling tradition.

It is believed that Ari later became a Christian priest in Staður by Ölduhryggur, now known as Staðastaður, but otherwise little is known about his life, despite the fact that he is one of the very few medieval writers who wrote down his family history.

Íslendingabók is the only work with evidence of his authorship, but he is accredited with numerous articles of knowledge and is believed to have had a major part in the writing of Landnámabók, which chronicles the settlement of Iceland.

Ari was early on regarded as an important author. In Iceland's First Grammatical Treatise, written around 1160 AD, he is referred to with respect as an exceptional man, since the tradition of writing was not firmly established at the time.

== See also ==
- List of Icelandic writers
- Culture of Iceland
