= Roman Catholic Diocese of Skálholt =

Roman Catholic titular see

The Roman Catholic Diocese of Skálholt has been a titular see of the Catholic Church since 1968. It was the estate of the first bishop in Iceland, Isleifr Gizurarson, who became bishop in 1056. Christianity had been formally adopted in 1000. His son, Gizurr, donated it to become the official see of the Diocese. It ceased its functions as a Roman Catholic diocese with the Reformation.

Coordinates: 64.1252, -20.5246

== Roman Catholic bishops ==
- 1056–1080: Ísleifur Gissurarson
- 1082–1118: Gissur Ísleifsson
- 1118–1133: Þorlákur Runólfsson
- 1134–1148: Magnús Einarsson
- 1152–1176: Klængur Þorsteinsson
- 1178–1193: St. Þorlákur helgi Þórhallsson
- 1195–1211: Páll Jónsson
- 1216–1237: Magnús Gissurarson
- 1238–1268: Sigvarður Þéttmarsson (Norwegian)
- 1269–1298: Árni Þorláksson
- 1304–1320: Árni Helgason
- 1321–1321: Grímur Skútuson (Norwegian)
- 1322–1339: Jón Halldórsson (Norwegian)
- 1339–1341: Jón Indriðason (Norwegian)
- 1343–1348: Jón Sigurðsson
- 1350–1360: Gyrðir Ívarsson (Norwegian)
- 1362–1364: Þórarinn Sigurðsson (Norwegian)
- 1365–1381: Oddgeir Þorsteinsson (Norwegian)
- 1382–1391: Mikael (Danish)
- 1391–1405: Vilchin Hinriksson (Danish)
- 1406–1413: Jón (Norwegian)
- 1413–1426: Árni Ólafsson
- 1426–1433: Jón Gerreksson (Danish)
- 1435–1437: Jón Vilhjálmsson Craxton (English)
- 1437–1447: Gozewijn Comhaer (Dutch)
- 1448–1462: Marcellus de Niveriis (German)
- 1462–1465: Jón Stefánsson Krabbe (Danish)
- 1466–1475: Sveinn spaki Pétursson
- 1477–1490: Magnús Eyjólfsson
- 1491–1518: Stefán Jónsson
- 1521–1540: Ögmundur Pálsson

== Titular see ==
In 1968, the former Catholic bishopric was revived as a titular see. Holders of the title have been:

- Archbishop Jan Baptist Hubert Theunissen, S.M.M. (19 December 1968 – 9 April 1979; former Archbishop of Blantyre, Malawi) (Note: Until Pope Paul VI altered the practice, a bishop emeritus was assigned a titular see. In this instance, Theunissen was Archbishop emeritus of Blantyre and Titular Archbishop of Skálholt.)
- Bishop Alphonsus Maria H.A. Castermans (15 January 1982 – 21 April 2008), Auxiliary Bishop of Roermond, Netherlands, from 1982 to 1997
- Bishop Paul Mason (23 April 2016 – 9 July 2019), Auxiliary Bishop of Southwark (UK), appointed Bishop of the Military Ordinariate of the UK
- Archbishop Antoine Camilleri (4 October 2019 – present), Apostolic Nuncio
