= Bryndís =

Bryndís is a given name. Notable people with the name include:

- Bryndís Benediktsdóttir (born 1951), Icelandic professor
- Bryndís Einarsdóttir (born 1958), Icelandic footballer
- Bryndís Guðmundsdóttir (born 1988), Icelandic basketball player
- Bryndís Haraldsdóttir (born 1976), Icelandic politician
- Bryndís Hlöðversdóttir (born 1960), Icelandic politician
- Bryndís Rún Hansen (born 1993), Icelandic swimmer
- Bryndís Lára Hrafnkelsdóttir (born 1991), Icelandic footballer
- Bryndís Ólafsdóttir (born 1969), Icelandic swimmer
- Bryndís Pétursdóttir (1928–2020), Icelandic actress
- Bryndís Valsdóttir (born 1964), Icelandic philosopher
- Nanna Bryndís Hilmarsdóttir (born 1989), Icelandic musician

== See also ==
- Grupo Bryndis, Mexican grupero band
