= Ásdís =

- Gender: Female

Origin
- Origin: Iceland

Ásdís is an Icelandic female given name. It is derived from the Old Norse elements áss (god) and dís (goddess). Notable people with the name include:

- Ásdís Egilsdóttir (born 1946), Icelandic scholar
- Ásdís Hjálmsdóttir (born 1985), Icelandic javelin thrower
- Ásdís María Viðarsdóttir (born 1993), Icelandic singer and songwriter
- Ásdís Rán Gunnarsdóttir (born 1979), Icelandic model, entrepreneur and television producer
- Ásdís Thoroddsen (born 1959), Icelandic filmmaker and actress
- Martha Ásdís Hjálmarsdóttir, Icelandic biologist
- Sigríður Ásdís Snævarr (born 1952), Icelandic diplomat
