= Ásdís Egilsdóttir =

Icelandic academic

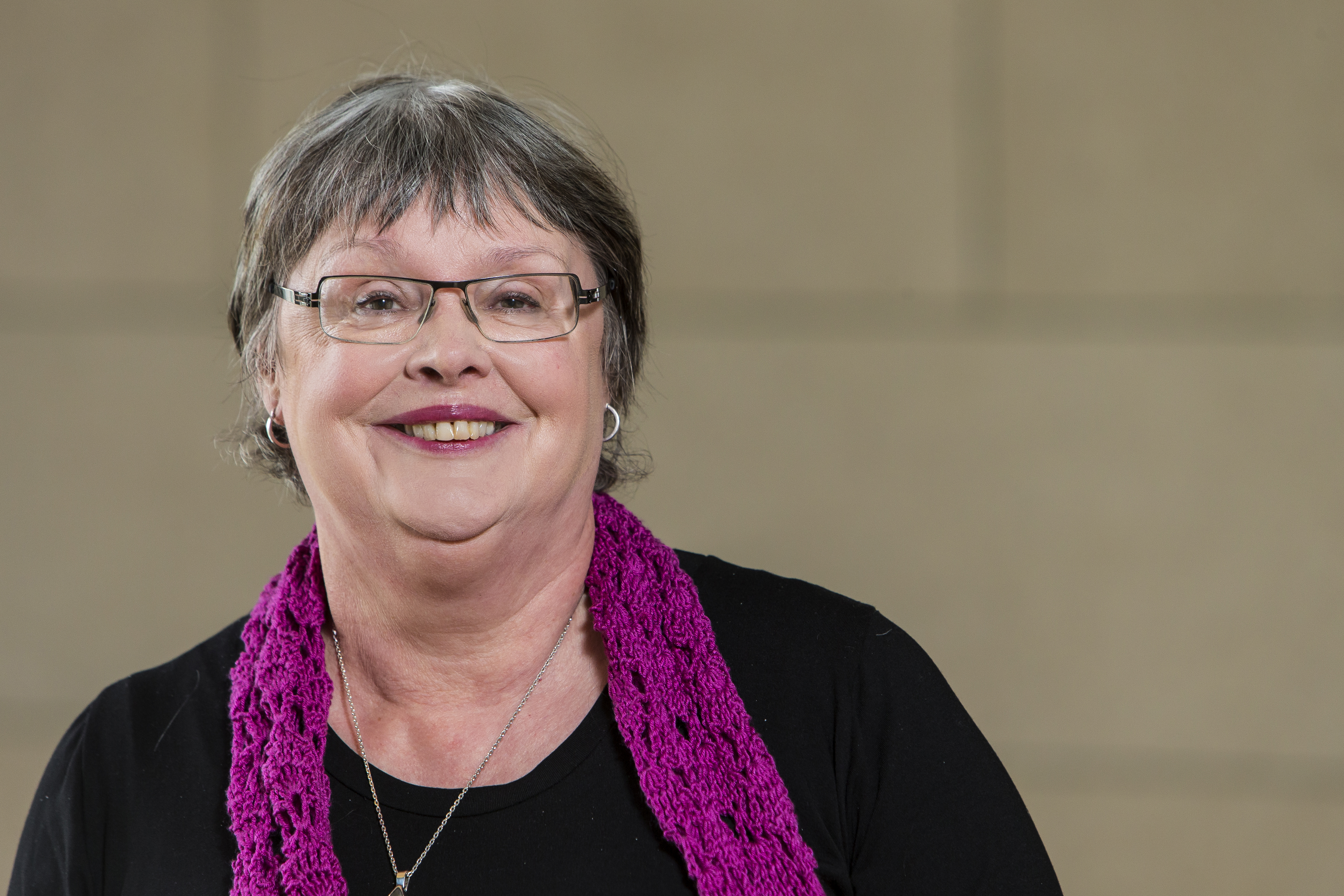
- Born: 26 October 1946 (age 79)
- Occupations: professor emerita in the Faculty of Icelandic and Comparative Cultural Studies at the University of Iceland

Ásdís Egilsdóttir (born 26 October 1946) is a former professor in the Faculty of Icelandic and Comparative Cultural Studies at the University of Iceland.

== Professional career ==
Ásdís completed a BA degree in Icelandic, Library Science and French at the University of Iceland in 1970 and a Cand. mag. degree in Icelandic Literature in 1982. She worked at the Árni Magnússon Institute for Icelandic Studies during the period 1970–1989 and was furthermore a part-time lecturer at the University of Iceland until she was appointed Assistant Professor in Medieval Icelandic Literature in 1991. She was promoted to the position of Professor in 2009 and retired at the end of October 2016.

Ásdís's research spans a wide field within Icelandic medieval literature, but the main emphases in her research are Nordic hagiography, translations and vernacular texts, masculinity and gender, writing and reading and literacy in the Middle Ages and memory studies. A collection of her articles, Fræðinæmi, was published on the occasion of her seventieth birthday in October 2016. The collection also includes her bibliography up until 2016. In addition to printed works, she has also held a number of lectures at Icelandic and foreign universities. Among her main works is Biskupa sögur II (e. Stories of Bishops II), which is a detailed edition of Hungurvaka, Þorláks saga as well as books of miracles and Páls saga, with a thorough introduction and notes. Ásdís has sought to relate historiography on Icelandic saints to international hagiography tradition and has written articles on this subject. A few of them are published in Fræðinæmi. Ásdís is a pioneer in studies of masculinity in Icelandic medieval literature. Here, she has discussed varied manifestations of masculinity and the demands that society placed on men in the Middle Ages. These demands and stories of young men during their formative years are covered in the article “Kolbítur verður karlmaður” (e. Male Cinderella Becomes a Man), which is printed in Fræðinæmi. She has also contributed to memory research in the article “From Orality to Literacy” where memoria artificialis is discussed, methods that medieval people used to learn by heart and metaphors that are drawn from these methods. Ásdís pointed out that this type of figurative language was used in Jóns saga helga. The article is printed in Fræðinæmi. Along with Dagný Kristjánsdóttir, Professor of Icelandic Literature, and Bryndís Benediktsdóttir, Professor of Communication Studies in the Faculty of Medicine, Ásdís took the initiative in starting teaching Literature within the Faculty of Medicine. Here, literary texts are used to increase understanding of patients’ circumstances and emotions. Later, Bergljót Soffía Kristjánsdóttir, Professor of Icelandic Literature, and Guðrún Steinþórsdóttir, Doctoral student, joined the group and this teaching and research field has been considerably strengthened.

Ásdís has held various commissions of trust. She was an alternate member of the Icelandic Naming Committee 1993–1997, Chair of the Department of Icelandic 1995–1998 and served on the board of the Institute of Literary Studies 1994–1996 and on the board of the Institute of Research in Literature and Visual Arts 2014–2016. She was on the board of the Research Institute of Women's and Gender Studies 2006–2009 and was a representative of the Faculty of Humanities at the University Assembly 2005–2008. She was also on the board of the Association of University Teachers 2005–2007 and an alternate member of the Association of University Teachers in the University Council 2006–2008. Ásdís was active in Nordplus, Erasmus and Socrates collaboration and has been a visiting teacher at ten universities in seven countries: the Faroe Islands, Norway, England, Germany, Italy, Poland and the Czech Republic. As a gesture of appreciation for her work at Polish universities, her Polish colleagues dedicated to her the work Aspects of Royal Power in Medieval Scandinavia.

== Personal life ==
Ásdís's parents were Erla Sigurjónsdóttir, hospital orderly (1928–2008), and Egill Valgeirsson, barber (1925–2012). Ásdís is married to Erlendur Sveinsson, film maker and former Director of the Icelandic Film Archive. Among his works are Drauminn um veginn, Íslands þúsund ár and Verstöðin Ísland. They have two children and four grandchildren.
