= Hrafnkelsdóttir =

Hrafnkelsdóttir is an Icelandic surname. Notable people with the surname include:

- Bryndís Lára Hrafnkelsdóttir (born 1991), Icelandic footballer
- Elín Sóley Hrafnkelsdóttir (born 1998), Icelandic basketball player
