= Egilsdóttir =

Egilsdóttir is an Icelandic surname. Notable people with the surname include:

- Ásdís Egilsdóttir (born 1946), Icelandic professor
- Thorgerd Egilsdottir (fl. 10th century), Icelandic woman
- Þórunn Egilsdóttir (1964–2021), Icelandic politician
- Ingibjörg Egilsdóttir (born 1985), Icelandic model and former beauty pageant contestant
