= Holtsós =

Tidal lagoon in Iceland

- Location within Iceland
- Location: Iceland
- Coordinates: 63.547635°N 19.743233°W
- Type: lagoon
- Max. length: 4 kilometres (2.5 mi)
- Max. width: 2 kilometres (1.2 mi)
- Max. depth: 2 metres (6.6 ft)

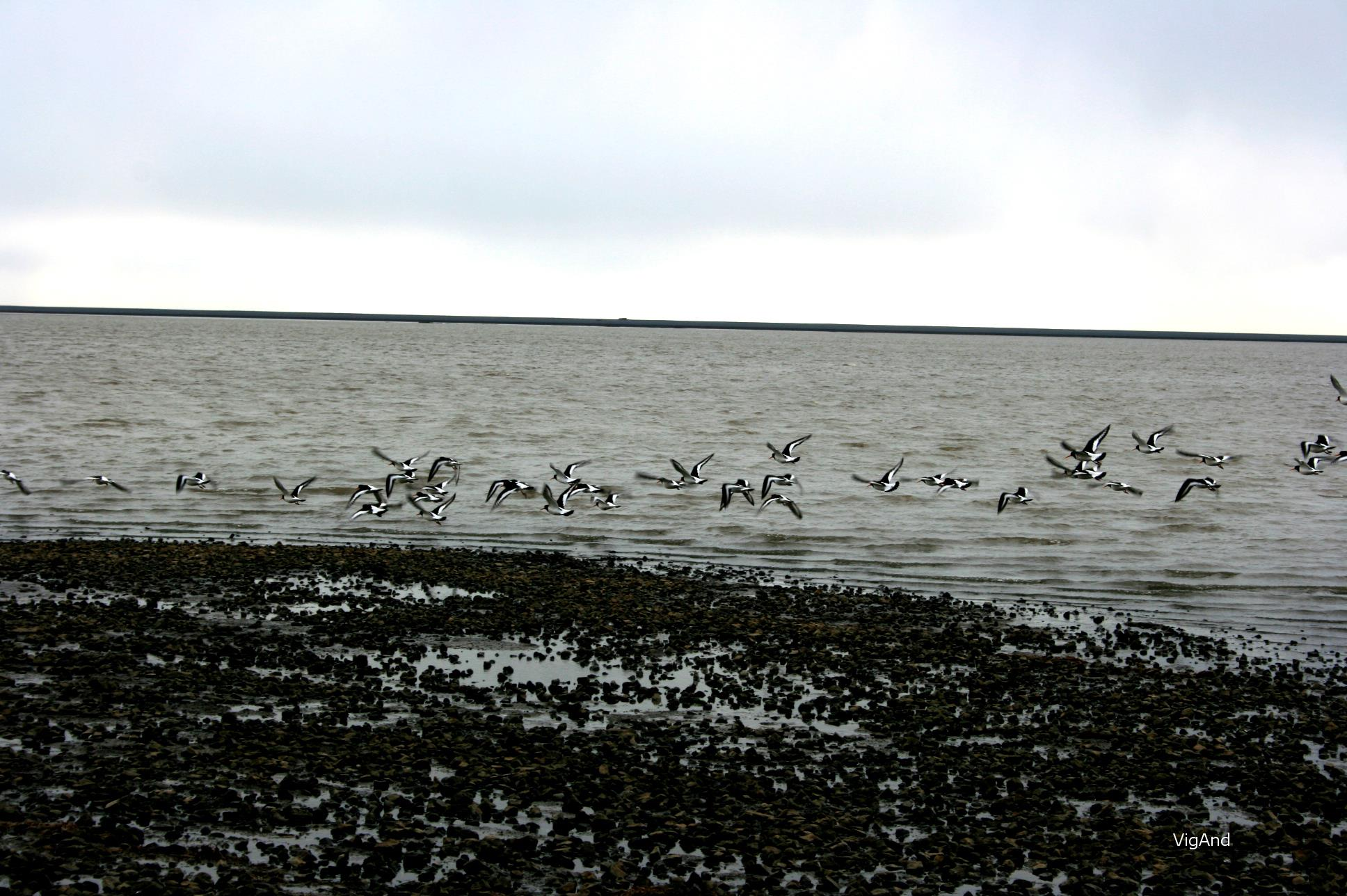
Eurasian oystercatchers over Holtsós, photographed in 2013

Holtsós (Icelandic pronunciation: [ˈhɔl̥(t)sˌouːs]), sometimes anglicised as Holtsos, is a tidal lagoon south of Eyjafjallajökull in south Iceland. It is fed by the Holtsá river and separated from the Atlantic Ocean by a narrow strip of sand. It is approximately 4 kilometres (2.5 mi) long by 2 kilometres (1.2 mi) wide and approximately 2 metres (6.6 ft) deep at its deepest point.

== Ecology ==
The lagoon has a sedimented bottom and no appreciable salt gradient. Species found there include Gammarus zaddachi and Gammarus duebeni. Eurasian oystercatchers frequent it. Above Holtsós is a deep freshwater pool called Hellisvatn after the cave that overlooks it, Steinahellir, which was the location of the district assembly for Eyjafjöll from 1818 to 1905. Hellisvatn does not freeze and therefore attracts many birds in winter when other sources of water are frozen over.

Like other shallow lagoons, Holtsós is prone to overflow its banks when the river feeding it runs high, and it is often necessary to keep the opening to the ocean open against sedimentation to prevent flooding of the adjacent land.

== History and literature ==
Mediaeval names for the lagoon were Holtárós, Holtavatn or Holtavatnsós. In the 12th century, ships sometimes used it as a harbour. Its frequent flooding is mentioned in one of the Old Norse accounts of Bishop Þorlák, Jarteinabók Þorláks saga byskups önnur. The farm called Holt, immediately to the west, was an important centre in the Middle Ages, and Holtsós is probably also identical with the Arnarbælisóss of Njáls saga.

Holtsós also occurs in one of the Icelandic folktales recorded by Jón Árnason. A fisherman has a dream foretelling that he will undergo a test at sea off Holtsós. He lays his boat up and believes he has avoided the danger when it is destroyed on land by a storm, but then crewing for another man, he is the only casualty when another storm blows up and the ship is wrecked off Holtsós.
