= Kristján Valur Ingólfsson =

The Right Reverend Kristján Valur Ingólfsson
- Bishop of Skálholt
- Church: Church of Iceland
- Diocese: Skálholt
- Elected: August 2011
- In office: 2011–2018
- Predecessor: Sigurður Sigurðarson
- Successor: Kristján Björnsson

Orders
- Consecration: 18 September 2011 by Karl Sigurbjörnsson

Personal details
- Born: 28 October 1947 (age 78) Grenivik, Iceland
- Denomination: Lutheran
- Spouse: Margrét Bóasdóttir
- Children: 2
- Education: University of Iceland

Kristján Valur Ingólfsson (born 28 October 1947) is an Icelandic prelate, theologian and lecturer who served as Bishop of Skálholt and suffragan of the Bishop of Iceland from 2011 to 2018.

== Early life ==
Kristján Valur Ingólfsson was born on 28 October 1947 in Grenivik, in Laufásprestakall Iceland, the son of Hólmfríður Björnsdóttir and Ingólfur Benediktsson. They had ten children, and Kristján Valur is sixth child born.

== Education ==
After completing a full-time diploma in Grenivík and study at Sigurður Guðmundsson's home school at Grenjaðsstaður one winter, he studied two years at Laugur in Reykjadalur. He attended the school at Laugarvatn from 1964 to 1968 and undertook a matriculation examination there. He graduated from the Faculty of Theology of the University of Iceland in 1968 in Cand.theol. He also studied in Educational Theology from the University of Heidelberg in Germany from 1977-1984 and again 1996-1997.

== Works ==
Valur wrote a number of articles in Church Literature and the series of theology, book chapters and hymns, based on psalms and songbooks.

== Bishop ==
Kristján Valur was elected bishop in August 2011 and was consecrated bishop on 18 September 2011 by Bishop of Iceland Karl Sigurbjörnsson and con-consecrated by Matti Repo, Bishop of Tampere, and David Hamid, Suffragan Bishop in Europe, in Skálholt Cathedral.

== Personal life ==
Kristján Valur and Margrét Bóasdóttir, singer and choir director have been married for 40 years. They have two sons, one a fashion designer and one a singer.
