= Þorláks saga helga =

Icelandic saga

Þorláks saga helga (The saga of St Þorlákr) is a saga about Saint Þorlákr Þórhallsson (1133–93) and the main source of evidence for his life.

== Versions and attestations ==
The earliest fragment of the saga is in Latin, surviving most importantly in AM 386 4to, whose first half seems, to judge by the script, to be from around 1200. This version was probably composed in association with the translation of Þorlákr's relics by his successor Páll Jónsson.

The saga then survives in Old Norse in four related medieval versions, with the following primary manuscripts:

- 1: Stockholm Perg. fol. 5 (mid C14)
- 2: AM 382 4to (first half of C14)
- 3: AM 209 fol. (C17); AM 219 fol. (end of C14); AM 379-80 4to (C17); AM 383 III-IV 4to (early C15); AM 388 4to (C17)
- 4: AM 383 I 4to (mid-C13, fragment only)

The material in these also overlaps with material in a number of miracle books.

It is thought that we owe the vernacular saga to the same person who composed Hungrvaka and Páls saga biskups, working in the first couple of decades of the thirteenth century. His work is perhaps most closely represented by the surviving version (1). Versions (2) and (3) would represent partly independent redactions, each with its own omissions and additions, but both (2) and (3) share a long additional section, called the Oddaverja þáttr, which is about the disputes between Þorlákr and the secular aristocrat Jón Loptsson (father of Bishop Páll Jónsson).

== Literary style ==
According to Paul Bibire,

The saga is fairly strictly narrative in form, and although it is a saint's life, the conventions of this genre are accommodated happily to those of Icelandic contemporary biography. Its style is rather Latinate, and is replete with biblical quotations; further, it has both a religion passion and a homely vividness of presentation wholly lacking in Hungrvaka, and very largely also in Páls saga biskups. The miracles included in the saga and in the miracle books give correspondingly vivid glimpses of the daily life of ordinary Icelanders.

== Translations ==
- Ásdis Egilsdóttir: The beginnings of local hagiography in Iceland: the lives of Bishops Þorlákr and Jón. Copenhagen: Museum Tusculanum Press, 2006.
- Loth, Agnete: Den Gamle jærtegnsbog om biskop Thorlak. Oversat med inledning og efterord af Agnete Loth. Odense: Odense universitetsforlag, 1984. (in Danish)
- Oddaverja-Þáttr - The Second Life of Thorlac. Icelandic-English. In: Origines Islandicae - A collection of the more important sagas and other native writings relating to the settlement and early history of Iceland. Edited and translated by Gudbrand Vigfusson and F. York Powel. Volume I. Oxfort at the Clarendon Press, 1905. pp. 567–591.
- Le Dit des Gens d'Oddi. Traduction de Grégory Cattaneo. Paris: Presses universitaires de Paris Sorbonne. En cours de publication.
- Thorlaks saga - Palls saga. Oslo: Aschehoug, 2011. (Thorleif Dahls kulturbibliotek, Bd. 43) ISBN 9788203197840.
- Þorláks saga - the Story of Bishop Thorlac. Icelandic-English. In: Origines Islandicae - A collection of the more important sagas and other native writings relating to the settlement and early history of Iceland. Edited and translated by Gudbrand Vigfusson and F. York Powel. Volume I. Oxfort at the Clarendon Press, 1905. pp. 458–502.
- Gottskálk Jensson: “The lost latin literature of medieval Iceland - the fragments of the Vita sancti Thorlaci and other evidence”. In: Symbolae Osloenses - Norwegian Journal of Greek and Latin Studies Volume 79 (2004), Issue 1, pages 150-170.
- Stories of the Bishops of Iceland. I, The Stories of Thorwald the Far-Farer, and of Bishop Isleif, II, Húngrvaka [the Hunger-Waker], Being Chronicles of the First Five Bishops of Skalholt, III, The Story of Bishop Thorlak the Saint. Translated by Mary C. J. Disney Leith. London, J. Masters, 1895.
- Wolf, Kirsten: “A Translation of the Latin Fragments Containing the Life and Miracles of St Thorlákr along with Collections of Lectiones for Recitation on His Feast-Days”. In: Proceedings of the PMR Conference - Annual Publication of the Patristic. Medieval and Renaissance Conference 14 (1989), pp. 261–276. Villanova (Pennsylvania): Villanova University, Augustinian Historical Institute.
