= Gerður Helgadóttir =

Icelandic artist (1928–1975)

- Born: 1928; Iceland
- Died: 1975 (aged 46–47)
- Education: Art and Craft School of Iceland
- Known for: Sculpture, Stained Glass
- Awards: Order of the Falcon

Gerður Helgadóttir (1928–1975) was an Icelandic sculptor and stained glass artist.

She studied at the Art and Craft School of Iceland (MHÍ), in Denmark, at the Accademia di Belle Arti Firenze and at the Académie de la Grande Chaumière, Paris. Perhaps her most noted work was her stained glass in Skálholt Cathedral and the church in Kópavogur.

== Honours ==
In 1974, she was awarded the Order of the Falcon.

== Artworks ==
In the 1960s, Gerður produced geometric ironworks which earned her fame as a pioneer of three-dimensional abstract artworks in Iceland. Gerður was renowned for her glass works, which decorate six churches in Iceland alone.

In 1973, she created a large mosaic at the Tollhús in Hafnarstræti in Reykjavík which was one of the largest artworks to have been produced in Iceland up until that point.

== Death ==
After Gerður's death the contents of her studio in Paris were rescued by her friend Elin Palmadottir and her sister Unnur and moved to Iceland. They were donated to the city of Kópavogur with the conditions that they build a museum in her honor and preserve and showcase her work. The Gerðarsafn Kópavogur Art Museum opened in 1994.

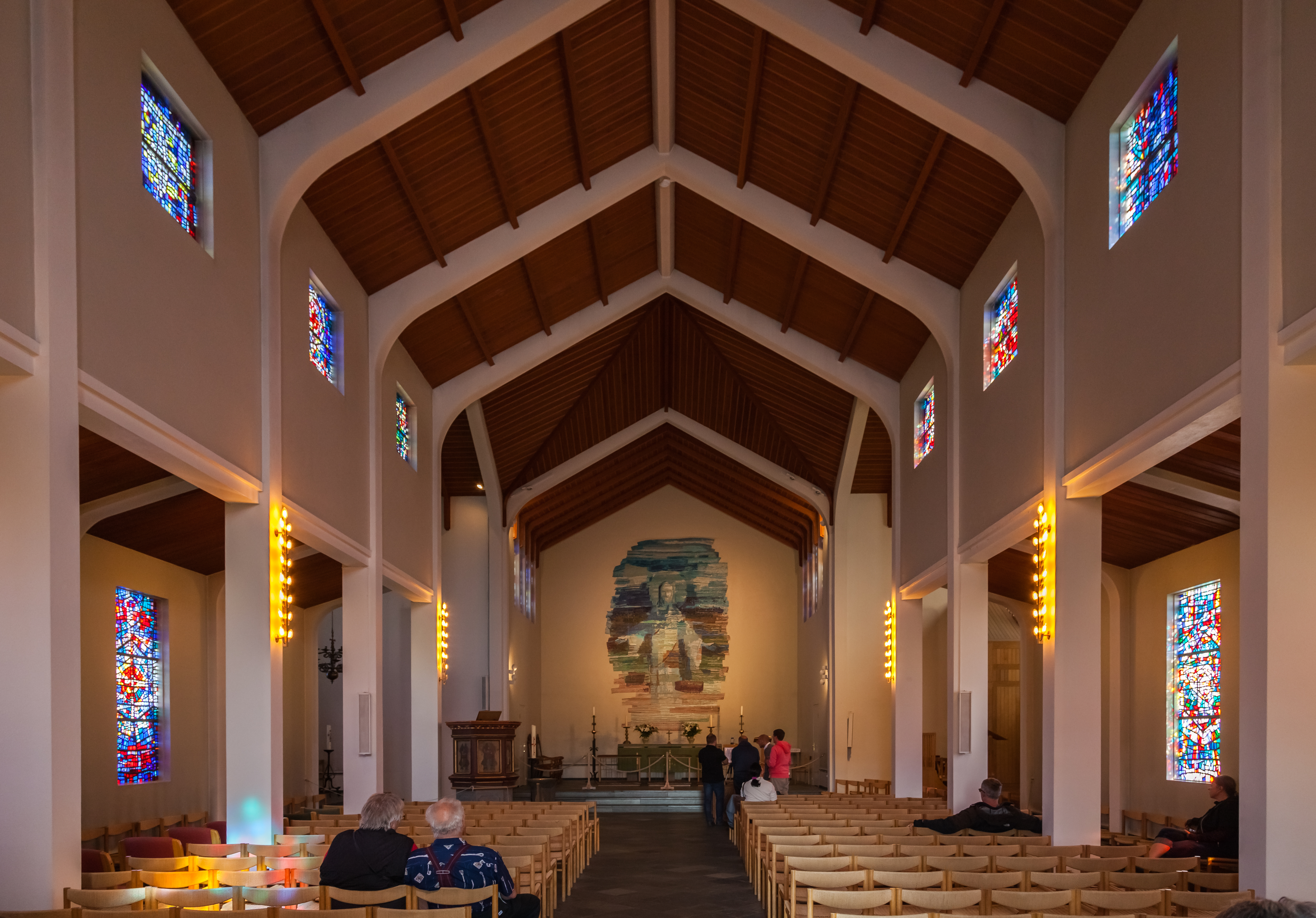
Stained glass window works within the Skalholt Church created by Gerdur Helgadottir.

== Other sources ==
- Elín Pálmadóttir, (1998) Gerður: ævisaga myndhöggvara önnur útgáfa (Listasafn KópavogsGerðarsafn).
- Gerður Helgadóttir myndhöggvari (1995) (Listasafn Kópavogs – Gerðarsafn).
