= Yngvildr Þorgilsdóttir =

Yngvildr Þorgilsdóttir (anglicised as Yngvild Þorgils' daughter, fl. 1158–1185) was a twelfth-century Icelandic woman who appears in Sturlunga saga, where she is involved in one of the feuds of Sturla of Hvamm, patriarch of the Sturlungs. She was the mistress of Bishop Klængr Þorsteinsson.

== Life ==
=== Early life ===
Yngvildr was one of nine children of Þorgils Oddason and his wife Kolfinna. She married a man named Halldór Bergsson, but the marriage was not an affectionate one and broke down after the death of her father. After Halldór’s death abroad, she lived with her brother-in-law. While living at his farm, she cared for a wounded passer-by, Þorvarðr Þorgeirsson. She then built herself a home at Ballará.

=== Paternity lawsuit ===
About 1158, Yngvildr and Þorvarðr were suspected of having an affair, and when a child was born at Ballará it was rumoured to be theirs. Yngvildr’s brother Einarr accused Þorvarðr of being the father, and the lawsuit was opposed by Sturla, who was a relative of both Yngvildr and Þorvarðr. Bishop Klængr, a second cousin of Einar and Yngvildr, was called in to oversee a trial by hot iron. He ruled in Þorvarðr’s favour, imposing a fine on Einarr. Yngvildr then made Sturla responsible for collecting all debts owed to her.

That summer, Þorvarðr travelled to Eyjafjörð and Yngvildr followed him, disguised with a man’s clothing and haircut, and they departed for Norway together.

According to Guðmundar saga, Þorvarðr was eighteen years old at the time of his departure from Iceland, and went on to become a courtier of King Ingi Haraldsson and to marry a woman named Herdis Sighvatssdóttir.

=== Relationship with Klængr and later life ===
Sometime between 1158 and 1164, Yngvildr had a relationship with Bishop Klængr. They had a daughter, Jóra, who married the chieftain Þorvaldr Gizurarson, despite clerical objections that they were too closely related. It has been suggested that Klængr and Yngvild's relationship was relatively stable and may have been seen as an informal marriage.

By 1185, Yngvildr was staying with her son-in-law Þorvaldr. When her brother Einarr was killed, Yngvildr and his other sisters inherited his property. She brought a lawsuit against her son-in-law for wrongfully seizing part of the inheritance from her.

Orri Vésteinsson calls Yngvildr 'the twelfth century’s femme fatale.'
