= List of cathedrals in Iceland =

This is the list of cathedrals in Iceland sorted by denomination.

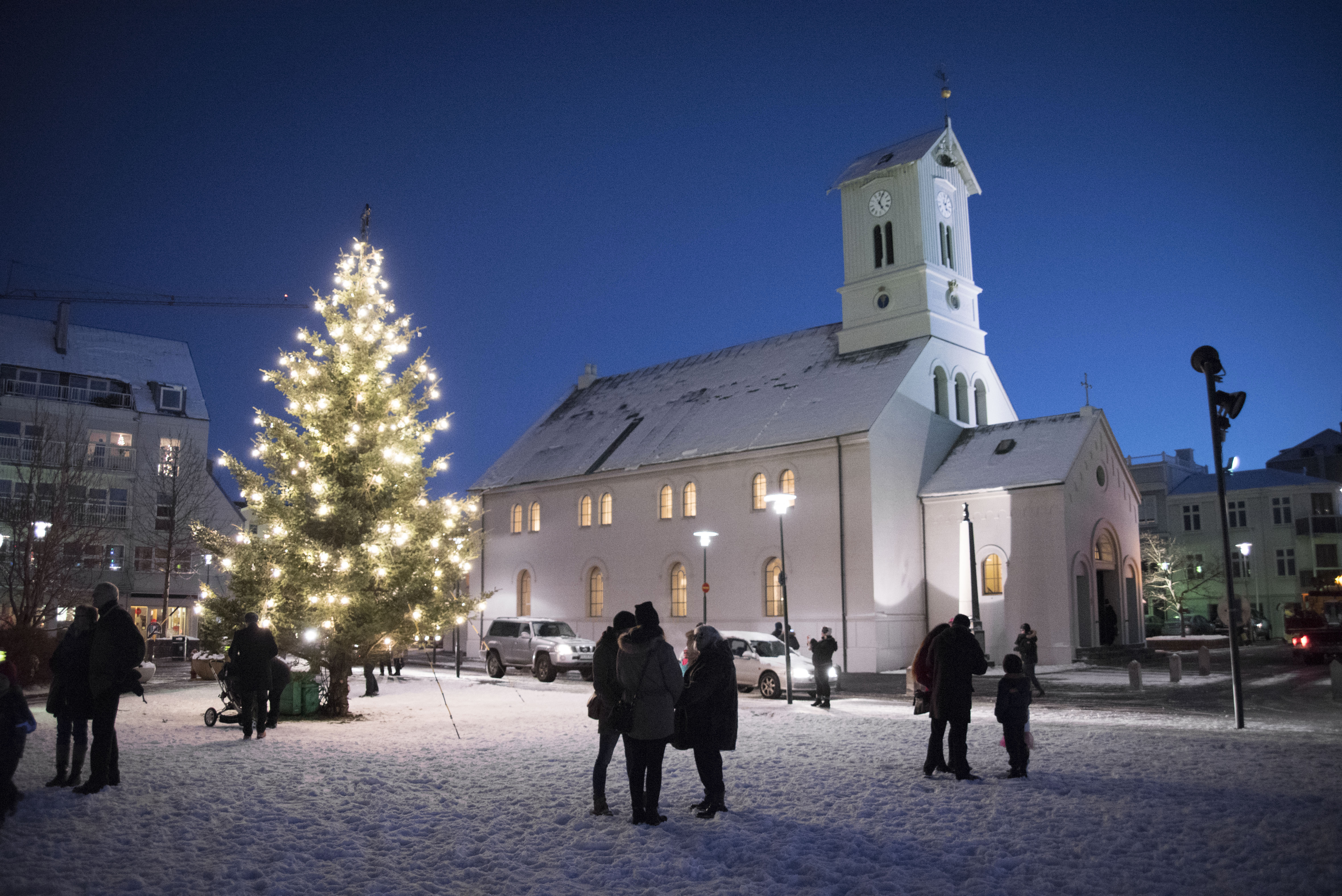
Reykjavík Cathedral

== Lutheran ==
Cathedrals of the Church of Iceland:

- Hólar Cathedral in Hólar
- Reykjavík Cathedral in Reykjavík
- Skálholt Cathedral in Skálholt

== Catholic ==
Cathedrals of the Catholic Church in Iceland:

- Landakotskirkja (Landakot's Church), formally named Basilika Krists konungs (The Basilica of Christ the King) in Reykjavík
