= Hungrvaka =

Old Norse history of the first five bishops of Skálholt

Hungrvaka ("Hunger-waker") is an Old Norse history of the first five bishops of Skálholt. The text covers the period from the formation of the Icelandic church to 1178. As the text refers to Saint Thorlak (acknowledged 1198), Jón Ögmundsson (acknowledged as a local Icelandic saint in 1200), and Gizurr Hallsson (died 1206), it was probably written in the first half of the thirteenth century. However, the manuscripts witnesses of the saga are all post-medieval, the earliest dating from 1601. Because of similarities in style it is assumed that the author of Hungrvaka wrote Páls saga biskups and may also have written passages of Þorláks saga helga.

The reason for the book's title is given by the author in the introduction:

‘Bœkling þenna kalla ek Hungrvǫku, af því at svá mun mǫrgum mǫnnum ófróðum ok þó óvitrum gefit vera, þeim er hann hafa yfir farit, at miklu myndu gørr vilja vita upprás ok ævi þeira merkismanna er hér verðr fátt frá sagt á þessi skrá.’ ‘I call this little book Hungrvaka because many men, unlearned and unwise as well, will be so disposed towards that which it has checked that they would wish to know more fully of the origin and lifetime of those remarkable men who shall briefly be recounted here in this written work.’

== Bibliography ==
=== Manuscripts ===
A comprehensive treatment of the manuscripts can be found in Ásdís Egilsdóttir's introduction to Hungrvaka in the most recent edition of the text, and summarised by Basset.

The main manuscripts represent three versions of the text:

- AM 380 4to, AM 379 4to (B)
- AM 205 fol., AM 375 4to, AM 378 4to (C)
- AM 110 8vo (D)

=== Editions ===
- Ásdís Egilsdóttir (2002). Ásdís Egilsdóttir (ed.). Biskupa sögur. Íslenzk fornrit XVI. Vol. 2. Reykjavík: Hið íslenzka fornritafélag.
- Gudbrand Vigfusson; Powell, F. York (1905). "Hungrvaca". Origines Islandicae: A collection of the more important sagas and other native writings relating to the settlement and early history of Iceland. Vol. 1. Oxford: Clarendon Press. pp. 425–458.
- Kahle, Bernhard (1905). "Hungrvaka". Kristnisaga: þáttr Þorvalds ens viðfǫrla, þáttr Ísleifs biskups Gizurarsonar, Hungrvaka. Altnordische Saga-Bibliothek 11. Halle: Max Niemeyer. pp. 87–126.

=== Translations ===
- Basset, Camilla (2013). Hungrvaka (PDF). Háskóli Íslands (MA thesis). pp. 43–73.
- Gudbrand Vigfusson; Powell, F. York (1905). "Hungrvaca". Origines Islandicae: A collection of the more important sagas and other native writings relating to the settlement and early history of Iceland. Vol. 1. Oxford: Clarendon Press. pp. 425–458.
