= Magnús Einarsson =

Magnús Einarsson (Old Norse: [ˈmɑɣnuːs ˈɛinˌɑrsˌson], Modern Icelandic: [ˈmaknuːs ˈeiːnarsˌsɔːn]; 1092 – September 30, 1148) was an Icelandic Catholic clergyman who became the fourth bishop of Skálholt from 1134 to 1148. He served the diocese of Skálholt. According to Hungrvaka, he intended to build a monastery on Vestmannaeyjar, but died before he could.

== See also ==
- List of Skálholt bishops

Preceded by Þorlákur Runólfsson	Bishop of Skálholt; 1134–1148	Succeeded by Klængur Þorsteinsson
