= Valdimar Briem =

Icelandic bishop (1848–1930)

The Right Reverend Valdimar Briem
- Bishop of Skálholt
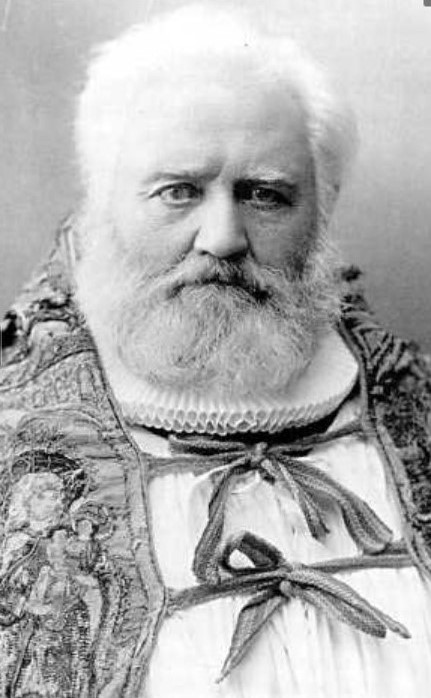
- Church: Church of Iceland
- Diocese: Skálholt
- Appointed: 27 December 1909
- In office: 1909–1930
- Successor: Sigurður P. Sívertsen

Orders
- Ordination: 27 April 1873
- Consecration: 28 August 1910 by Þórhallur Bjarnarson

Personal details
- Born: 1 February 1848 Eyjafjörður, Iceland
- Died: 3 April 1930 (aged 82) Stóri-Núpur, Iceland
- Denomination: Lutheran
- Parents: Olafur Briem & Dómhildur Þorsteinsdóttir
- Spouse: Olöfu
- Children: 2

Valdimar Briem (1 February 1848 - 3 May 1930) was an Icelandic poet, prelate, hymnwriter and translator. He served as the first Suffragan Bishop of Skálholt from 1909 till 1930.

== Biography ==
Briem was born at Grund in Eyjafjörður. His father was Ólafur Briem, a farmer and carpenter at Grund, and his mother was Dómhildur Þorsteinsdóttir. After the death of his parents, he was raised by his uncle in Hruna. He attended the Theological Seminary in Reykjavik and graduated in theology on 21 February 1873. He was ordained priest on 27 April 1873, after which he served as pastor of Hrepphólar in Hrunamannahreppur. Between 1880 and 1909 he became pastor of the Stóri-Núpur parish. He was a Dean of Árnesprófastsdæmi between 1896 and 1918. After the Diocese of Skálholt was re-established in 1909 as a suffragan see, he was appointed as its first bishop on 27 December 1909. He retained the post till his death.

He was a notable hymnwriter and translator, and he wrote around 80 hymns in the hymn book of the Church of Iceland. Ten of his hymns are also included in the hymn book of the Church of the Faroe Islands. A number of his hymns were also translated into English.
