= Saint Thorlak =

Icelandic prelate and saint, bishop of Skalholt

Saint Thorlak Thorhallsson
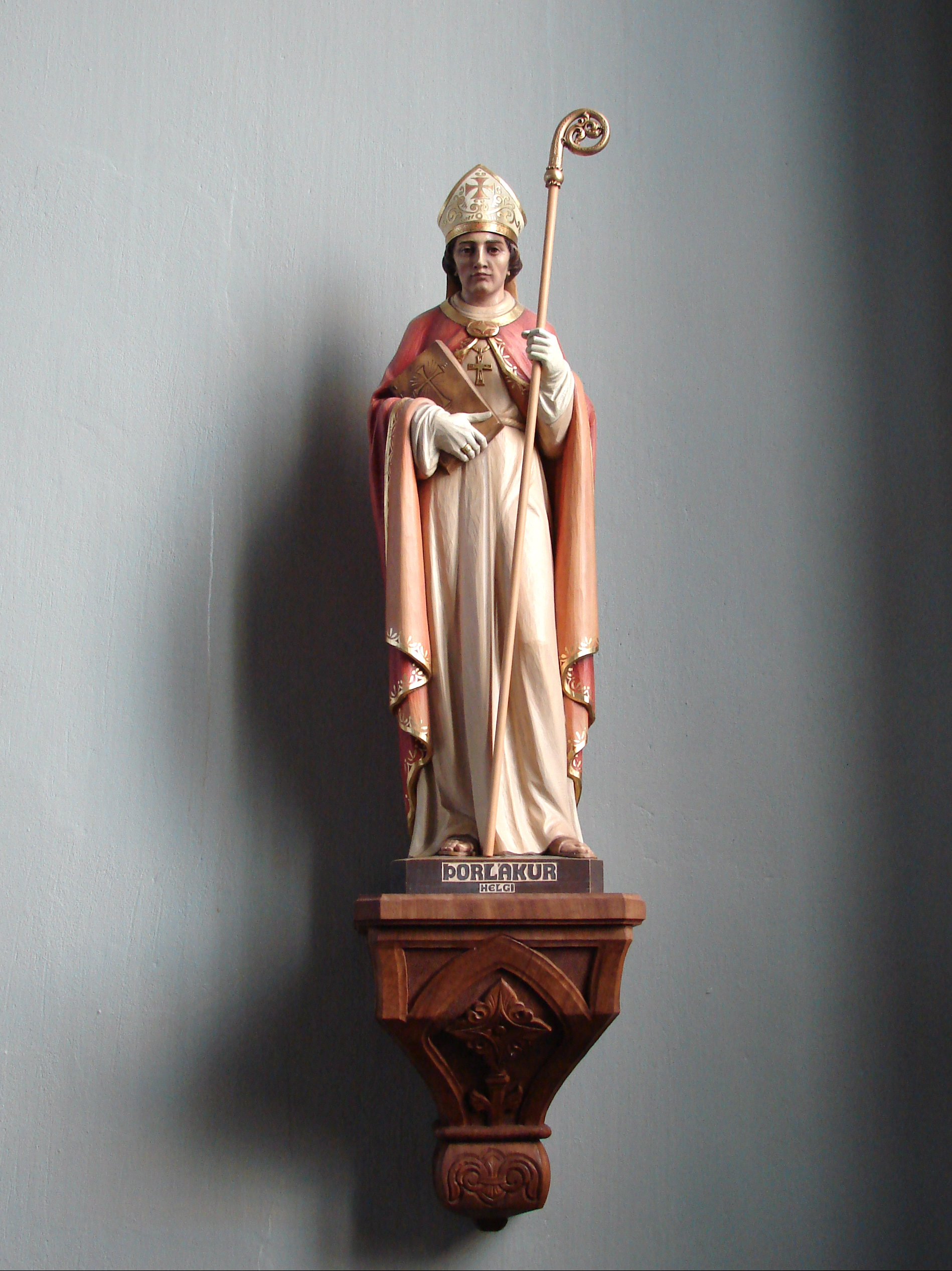
- Statue of Saint Thorlak at the Catholic Cathedral in Reykjavík, Iceland

Bishop of Skálholt
- Born: 1133; Fljótshlíð, Icelandic Commonwealth
- Died: 23 December 1193 (aged 59–60); Skálholt, Iceland
- Venerated in: Roman Catholic Church; Evangelical Lutheran Diocese of North America
- Canonized: 14 January 1984 by Pope John Paul II
- Feast: 23 December; 20 July (translation of relics)
- Patronage: Iceland, fishermen, Catholics of Scandinavia, Autistic people

Thorlak Thorhallsson (Icelandic: Þorlákur Þórhallsson; 1133 – 23 December 1193) is the patron saint of Iceland. He was Bishop of Skálholt from 1178 until his death. Thorlak's relics were translated to the Cathedral of Skalholt in 1198, not long after his successor, Páll Jónsson, announced at the Althing that vows could be made to Thorlak.

His status as a saint did not receive official recognition from the Catholic Church until 14 January 1984, when John Paul II canonized him and declared him the patron saint of Iceland. His feast day is 23 December, when Thorlak's Mass is celebrated in Iceland.

== Life ==
Born in 1133 at Hlíðarendi in the see of Skálholt in southern Iceland, Thorlak was from an agrarian family. He was ordained a deacon before he was fifteen and a priest at the age of eighteen. He studied abroad at Paris with the Victorines, where he learned the Rule of Saint Augustine from roughly 1153 to 1159, and then studied canon law in Lincoln.

Thorlak returned to Iceland, and in 1168, founded the first Augustinian monastery in Iceland at Þykkvabær. He was elected as bishop of Skálholt in 1174 and consecrated in 1178 by Eysteinn Erlendsson the Archbishop of Nidaros.

Thorlak died on 23 December 1193.

== Canonization and veneration ==
Thorlak's life and dozens of his miracles are described in great detail in the Icelandic saga Þorláks saga helga (the Saga of Saint Thorlak), republished in Icelandic on the occasion of John Paul II's visit to Iceland in 1989. It seems likely that Thorlak's informal sanctification in the Church in Iceland, promoted by Latin texts on which this was based, "was arranged in Icelandic ecclesiastical circles, clerics of both dioceses being conspicuous in reports of early miracles".

Thorlak was officially recognised as a saint of the Roman Catholic Church on 14 January 1984, when John Paul II canonized him and declared him the patron saint of Iceland. The Mass of St. Thorlak (Þorláksmessa; Icelandic pronunciation: [ˈθɔrˌlauksˌmɛssa]) is an Icelandic holiday celebrated on 23 December. The day is also celebrated in the Faroe Islands, where it is called Tollaksmessa (Faroese pronunciation: [ˈtʰɔtlaksˌmɛsːa]). In modern times, Þorláksmessa has become part of Christmas, or the last day of preparations before Christmas.

The sacred reliquary of Thorlak was maintained in the Diocese of Skálholt until it was destroyed in the Reformation, and his mortal remains were strewn about the cathedral grounds. The only known remaining relic of Thorlak is a bone fragment contained with other saints' relics in a lead box in sanctuary's end wall ("The Golden Locker") of the St. Magnus Cathedral, Faroe Islands.

A group based in the U.S. state of New York has advocated for Thorlak becoming the patron saint of people with autism.

Thorlak is also venerated by the Evangelical-Lutheran Diocese of North America.

== See also ==
- Christmas in Iceland

== Sources ==
- Fahn, Susanne Miriam; Gottskálk Jensson (2010). "The Forgotten Poem: A Latin Panegyric for Saint Þorlákr in AM 382 4to". Gripla (21). Árni Magnússon Institute for Icelandic Studies: 19–60.

Catholic Church titles
Preceded by Klængur Þorsteinsson	Bishop of Skálholt; 1178–1193	Succeeded by Páll Jónsson
