= Páls saga biskups =

Icelandic bishops' saga

Páls saga biskups (The Saga of bishop Páll) is an Old Norse account of the life of Páll Jónsson, bishop of the Icelandic episcopal see Skálholt.

The saga is recorded in three seventeenth-century manuscripts and subsequent copies: Stock. Papp. 4to no 4., AM 204 fol., and AM 205 fol. In each of these manuscripts, Páls saga follows Hungrvaka and Þorláks saga helga. All three manuscripts are of one version of the text, which is thought to be medieval. There are apparently no written sources of the text and it is likely that the author knew Páll Jónsson personally. Because of similarities in style, the author of Páls saga is thought to have also written Hungrvaka and passages of Þorláks saga helga. The saga is thought to have been written in the early part of the thirteenth century, shortly after Páll Jónsson's death in 1211.

== Editions and translations ==
- Ásdís Egilsdóttir (2002). Ásdís Egilsdóttir (ed.). Biskupa sögur. Íslenzk fornrit XVI. Vol. 2. Reykjavík: Hið íslenzka fornritafélag.
- Gudbrand Vigfusson; Powell, F. York (1905). "Póls saga". Origines Islandicae: A collection of the more important sagas and other native writings relating to the settlement and early history of Iceland. Vol. 1. Oxford: Clarendon Press. pp. 425–458. Edition and English translation
- "Páls biskups saga". Biskupa sögur. Vol. 1. Kaupmannahöfn [Copenhagen]: Hið íslenska bókmenntafélag. 1858. pp. 125–148.
