= Bryndís Einarsdóttir =

Icelandic football player

Personal information
- Date of birth: 29 May 1958 (age 68)
- Place of birth: Iceland
- Position: Forward

Senior career*
Years	Team	Apps	(Gls)
197?–1983	Breiðablik		
1984–1985	Asker		

International career
1981–1984	Iceland	6	(1)
- * Club domestic league appearances and goals

Bryndís Einarsdóttir (born 29 May 1958) is an Icelandic former footballer who was a member of Iceland's ignaural national team in 1981 where she scored Iceland's first ever goal.

== Club career ==
She played the majority of her career with Breiðablik. In June 1973, she scored 4 goals in Breiðablik's 14–0 victory against Haukar. On 1 September 1983, she arrived to Breiðablik's game against ÍA straight from Keflavík Airport and was substituted into the game when seven minutes into the second half. Despite her late arrival, she netted two goals in Breiðablik's 3–2 victory. In 1984, she moved to Norwegian club Asker where she played until her retirement.

== Honours ==
=== League ===
- Icelandic champion (6)
  - 1977, 1979, 1980, 1981, 1982, 1983
- Icelandic Cup (3)
  - 1981, 1982, 1983
