= Árni Þorláksson =

Icelandic Roman Catholic bishop

Árni Þorláksson (1237 – 17 April 1298; Old Norse: [ˈɑːrne ˈθorˌlɑːksˌson]; Modern Icelandic: [ˈau(r)tnɪ ˈθɔrˌlauksˌsɔːn]) was an Icelandic Roman Catholic clergyman, who became the tenth bishop of Iceland (1269–1298).

He served in the diocese of Skálholt. Árni had orders from his superior in Norway to take control of local church property away from secular chieftains. He was largely successful in this.

== See also ==
- List of Skálholt bishops

Catholic Church titles
Preceded by Sigvarður Þéttmarsson	Bishop of Skálholt; 1269–1298	Succeeded by Árni Helgason
