= Grímur Skútuson =

Grímur Skútuson (died 1321) was a Norwegian Roman Catholic clergyman, and monk, he was consecrated as bishop of Iceland in 1321, however he died before arriving in Iceland. He was scheduled to serve in the diocese of Skálholt.

== See also ==
- List of Skálholt bishops

Preceded by Árni Helgason	Bishop of Skálholt; 1321	Succeeded by Jón Halldórsson
