= Martha Ásdís Hjálmarsdóttir =

Icelandic academic

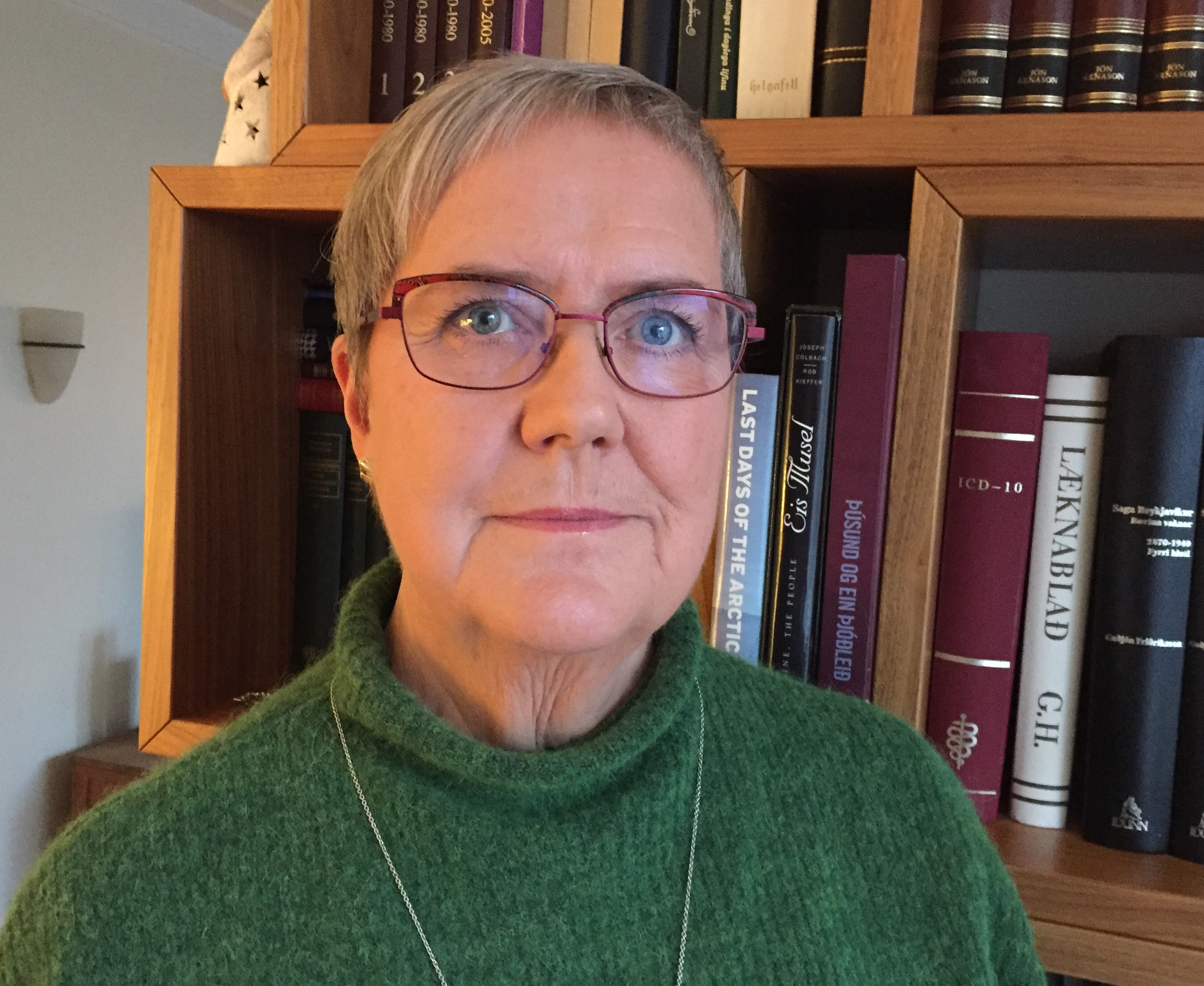
- Occupation: professor in biomedical science in the Department of Biomedical Science at the Faculty of Medicine of the University of Iceland

Martha Ásdís Hjálmarsdóttir is a professor in biomedical science in the Department of Biomedical Science at the Faculty of Medicine of the University of Iceland and is the head of department there.

== Professional experience ==
Martha graduated from Akureyri Junior College in 1971 (upper secondary school), completed undergraduate education in Biomedical Science from Icelandic Technical College (now merged with Reykjavik University), in 1973 and a doctorate in Biomedical Science from the University of Iceland in 2016. She was the first biomedical scientist to complete a doctorate from the University of Iceland. The title of her PhD dissertation is "The epidemiology of penicillin non-susceptible pneumococci in Iceland".

After completing studies in biomedical science, she began working as a biomedical scientist in the Department of Clinical Microbiology, Landspítali (The National University Hospital of Iceland). She is still there part-time working in educational administration. She began her teaching career in 1982 when she participated in reorganising of the curriculum in biomedical science for a bachelor of science degree at Icelandic Technical College. The first biomedical scientists graduated with a BS degree in 1985. ITC thereby became the first school in the Nordic countries to offer an undergraduate Bachelor of Science degree in biomedical science. Martha then began working at the University of Iceland in 2005 when the education in biomedical science was transferred there. In addition to teaching, she was hired as head of the Department of Biomedical Science. She led the organisation of the curriculum of both undergraduate and graduate programmes in biomedical science at the University of Iceland. The department was the first in the Nordic countries to offer a continuous programme in the field leading to an MS degree. Martha teaches especially in the field of medical microbiology. In 2019, she was promoted to professor at the Faculty of Medicine.

== Research ==
The principal theme of her research regards bacteria that are not susceptible to antimicrobial agents. In recent years, her research has primarily involved the epidemiology of penicillin non-susceptible pneumococci, the characteristics of their clones, and the effect of pneumococcal vaccinations on their incidence and distribution. In addition, she has done research, in collaboration with teachers and students in pharmacology, on the bacterial activity of various natural substances and their derivatives.

== Organisations and work on committees ==
Martha has been active in biomedical scientists' organisations and committee work. She has sat on many committees and boards of directors focusing on matters related to her work. These efforts include her stints as chairman of the Association of Biomedical Scientists from 1988 to 1993 and chairman of the Confederation of University Graduates from 1996 to 1998. She was the first woman in Iceland to be elected chairman of a general organisation of unions. She was on the Board of Directors of the International Federation of Biomedical Laboratory Science from 1994 to 2004 and president of the IFBLS from 2000 to 2002. In 2016, the federation awarded her recognition for her outstanding contribution to biomedical science in the international arena.

== Childhood and personal life ==
Martha is the daughter of Hjálmar Ágústsson, foreman and fish grader, and Svandís Ásmundsdóttir, housewife and office worker. She is married to Þorsteinn A. Jónsson, secretary general of the Supreme Court of Iceland. Their sons are Hjálmar, physician, and Magni, designer and merchant. Martha and Þorsteinn have five grandchildren.

== Main written works ==
- Hjalmarsdottir, M. A., Quirk, S.J., Haraldson G., Erlendsdottir H., Haraldsson A., Kristinsson K.G. (2017). Comparison of Serotype Prevalence of Pneumococci Isolated from Middle Ear, Lower Respiratory Tract and Invasive Disease Prior to Vaccination in Iceland. PLoS One 12(1): e0169210.
- Hjalmarsdottir, M. A., Gumundsdottir, P. F., Erlendsdottir, H., Kristinsson, K. G., & Haraldsson, G. (2016). Cocolonization of pneumococcal serotypes in healthy children attending day care centers: Molecular versus conventional methods. Pediatr Infect Dis J, 35(5), 477–480.
- Hjalmarsdottir, M. A., Petursdottir, B., Erlendsdottir, H., Haraldsson, G., & Kristinsson, K. G. (2015). Prevalence of pilus genes in pneumococci isolated from healthy preschool children in Iceland: association with vaccine serotypes and antibiotic resistance. J Antimicrob Chemother, 70(8), 2203–2208.
- Hjalmarsdottir, M. A., & Kristinsson, K. G. (2014). Epidemiology of penicillin-non-susceptible pneumococci in Iceland, 1995-2010. J. Antimicrob. Chemother., 69(4), 940–946.
- Thorsteinsson T, Masson M, Kristinsson KG, Hjalmarsdottir MA, Hilmarsson H. Loftsson T (2003). Soft antimicrobial agents: synthesis and activity of labile environmentally friendly long chain quaternary ammonium compounds. J Med Chem. 2003 Sep 11;46(19):4173-81.
- Ingólfsdóttir K, Hjálmarsdóttir MÁ, Sigurdson A, Gudjonsdottir GA, Brynjolfsdottir A, Steingrímsson O. (1997). In vitro susceptibility of Helicobacter pylori to protolichesterinic acid from the lichen Cetraria islandica. Antimicrobial Agents and Chemotherapy, 41(1):215-217.
