= Klængur Þorsteinsson =

Klængur Þorsteinsson (1102 – 28 February 1176; Modern Icelandic: [ˈkʰlaiŋkʏr ˈθɔrˌsteinsˌsɔːn]; Old Norse: Klœingr Þórsteinsson [ˈkløːeŋɡz̠ ˈθoːrˌstɛinsˌson]) was an Icelandic Catholic clergyman, who became the fifth bishop of Iceland from 1152 to 1176. He served in the diocese of Skálholt. He had a well-documented relationship with the widow Yngvildr Þorgilsdóttir.

== See also ==
- List of Skálholt bishops

Preceded by Magnús Einarsson	Bishop of Skálholt; 1152–1176	Succeeded by Þorlákur helgi Þórhallsson
