= Sigvarður Þéttmarsson =

Ninth bishop of Iceland from 1238–1268

Sigvarður Þéttmarsson (died 1268) was a Norwegian born, Icelandic Roman Catholic clergyman, who became the ninth bishop of Iceland from 1238 to his death in 1268. He served in the diocese of Skálholt.

== See also ==
- List of Skálholt bishops

Preceded by Magnús Gissurarson	Bishop of Skálholt; 1238–1268	Succeeded by Árni Þorláksson
