= Diocese of Skálholt =

Lutheran diocese in Iceland

Diocese of Skálholt Skálholtsbiskupa
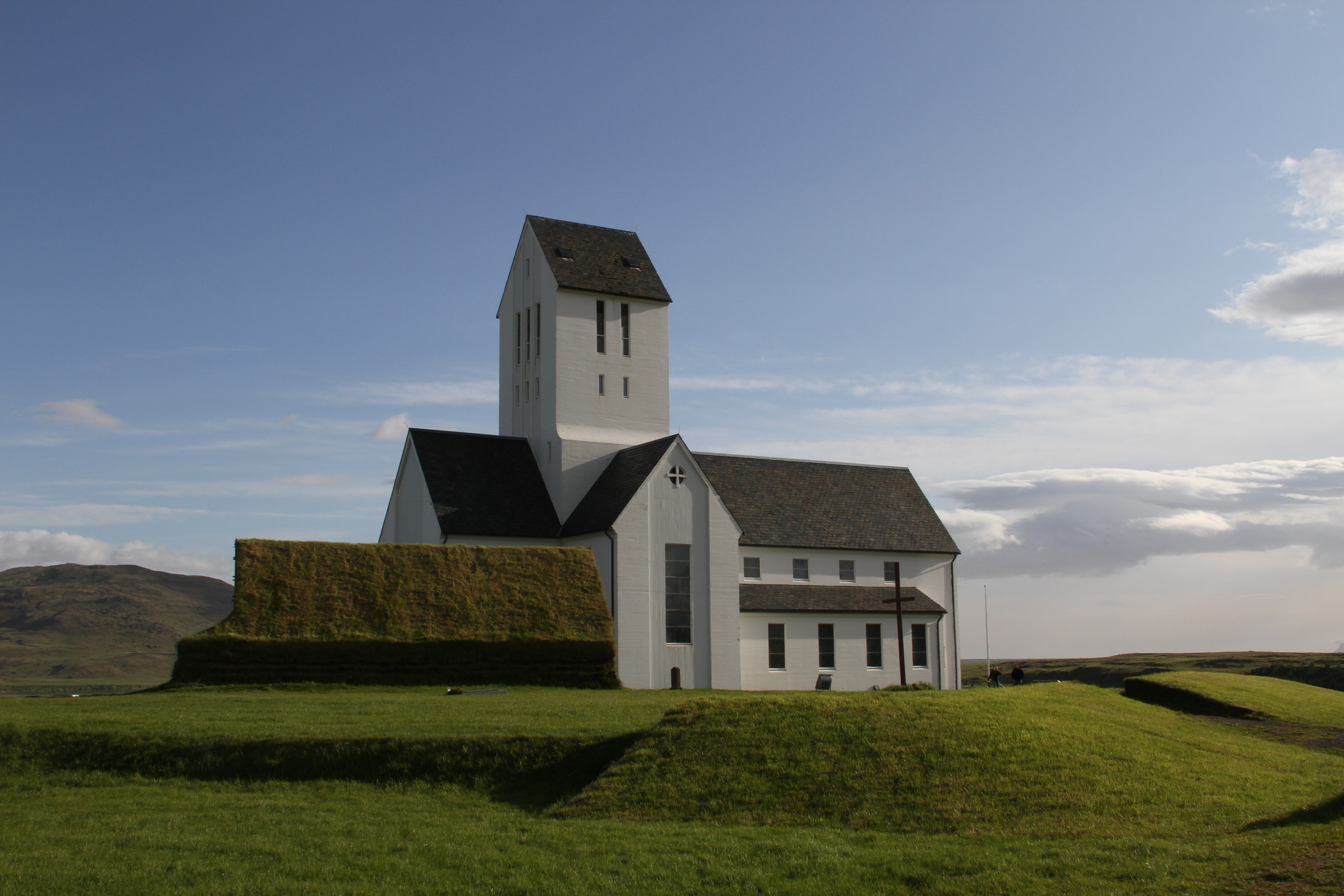
- Skálholt Cathedral

Location
- Country: Iceland
- Coordinates: 64.1252°N 20.5246°W

Information
- Denomination: Church of Iceland
- Established: 1056 (As Diocese of Skálholt); 1909 (As Suffragan Diocese of Skálholt)
- Dissolved: 1801 (As Diocese of Skálholt)
- Cathedral: Skálholt Cathedral
- Suffragan: Kristján Valur Ingólfsson

The Diocese of Skálholt (Icelandic: Skálholtsbiskupa [ˈskaulˌhɔl(t)sˌpɪskʏpa]) is a suffragan diocese of the Church of Iceland. It was the estate of the first bishop in Iceland, Isleifr Gizurarson, who became bishop in 1056. (Christianity had been formally adopted in 1000). His son, Gizurr, donated it to become the official see. The Diocese was amalgamated in 1801 and now forms part of the Diocese of Iceland under the leadership of the Bishop of Iceland. In 1909, the diocese was restored as a suffragan see, with the Bishop of Skálholt being a suffragan bishop to the Bishop of Iceland.

== Roman Catholic ==
- 1056–1080: Ísleifur Gissurarson
- 1082–1118: Gissur Ísleifsson
- 1118–1133: Þorlákur Runólfsson
- 1134–1148: Magnús Einarsson
- 1152–1176: Klængur Þorsteinsson
- 1178–1193: St. Þorlákur helgi Þórhallsson
- 1195–1211: Páll Jónsson
- 1216–1237: Magnús Gissurarson
- 1238–1268: Sigvarður Þéttmarsson (Norwegian)
- 1269–1298: Árni Þorláksson
- 1304–1320: Árni Helgason
- 1321–1321: Grímur Skútuson (Norwegian)
- 1322–1339: Jón Halldórsson (Norwegian)
- 1339–1341: Jón Indriðason (Norwegian)
- 1343–1348: Jón Sigurðsson
- 1350–1360: Gyrðir Ívarsson (Norwegian)
- 1362–1364: Þórarinn Sigurðsson (Norwegian)
- 1365–1381: Oddgeir Þorsteinsson (Norwegian)
- 1382–1391: Mikael (Danish)
- 1391–1405: Vilchin Hinriksson (Danish)
- 1406–1413: Jón (Norwegian)
- 1413–1426: Árni Ólafsson
- 1426–1433: Jón Gerreksson (Danish)
- 1435–1437: Jón Vilhjálmsson Craxton (English)
- 1437–1447: Gozewijn Comhaer (Dutch)
- 1448–1462: Marcellus de Niveriis (German)
- 1462–1465: Jón Stefánsson Krabbe (Danish)
- 1466–1475: Sveinn spaki Pétursson
- 1477–1490: Magnús Eyjólfsson
- 1491–1518: Stefán Jónsson
- 1521–1540: Ögmundur Pálsson

== Lutheran ==
- 1540–1548: Gissur Einarsson
- 1549–1557: Marteinn Einarsson
- 1558–1587: Gísli Jónsson
- 1589–1630: Oddur Einarsson
- 1632–1638: Gísli Oddsson
- 1639–1674: Brynjólfur Sveinsson
- 1674–1697: Þórður Þorláksson
- 1698–1720: Jón Vídalín
- 1722–1743: Jón Árnason
- 1744–1745: Ludvig Harboe (Danish)
- 1747–1753: Ólafur Gíslason
- 1754–1785: Finnur Jónsson
- 1777–1796: Hannes Finnsson
- 1797–1801: Geir Vídalín

The diocese was amalgamated in 1801 and now forms part of the Diocese of Iceland.

=== Suffragan bishopric ===
The see was discontinued from 1801 to 1909. It was revived in 1909 as a suffragan bishopric to the Bishop of Iceland, with the bishop's cathedra in the traditional Skálholt cathedral church. In 1990, new legislation increased the authority and responsibilities of the Bishop of Skálholt as an assistant bishop in the Reykjavik diocese.

- 1909–1930: Valdimar Briem
- 1931–1936: Sigurður P. Sívertsen
- 1937–1965: Bjarni Jónsson
- 1966–1983: Sigurður Pálsson
- 1983–1989: Ólafur Skúlason
- 1989–1994: Jónas Gíslason
- 1994–2010: Sigurður Sigurðarson
- 2011–2018: Kristján Valur Ingólfsson
- 2018–present: Kristján Björnsson

== See also ==
- Bishop of Iceland
- List of Hólar bishops
