= Þorlákur Runólfsson =

Þorlákur Runólfsson (1086–1133; Modern Icelandic: [ˈθɔrˌlauːkʏr ˈrʏːnˌoul(f)sˌsɔːn]; Old Norse: Þorlákr Rúnólfsson [ˈθorˌlɑːkz̠ ˈruːnˌoːlvsˌson]) was an Icelandic clergyman, who became the third bishop of Iceland from 1118 to his death in 1133. This followed the adoption of Christianity in 1000.

He served in the diocese of Skálholt.

== See also ==
- List of Skálholt bishops

| Preceded by Gissur Ísleifsson | Bishop of Skálholt; 1118–1133 | Succeeded by Magnús Einarsson |
