= Árni Helgason =

Roman Catholic bishop (1260–1320)

Árni Helgason (c. 1260 – 21 January 1320; Modern Icelandic: [ˈau(r)tnɪ ˈhɛlkaˌsɔːn]) was an Icelandic Roman Catholic clergyman, who became the eleventh bishop of the Icelandic diocese of Skálholt in 1304. He served until his death in 1320.

== See also ==
- List of Skálholt bishops

Catholic Church titles
Preceded by Árni Þorláksson	Bishop of Skálholt; 1304–1320	Succeeded by Grímur Skútuson
