= Magnús Gissurarson =

Icelandic Roman Catholic bishop

Magnús Gissurarson (Modern Icelandic: [ˈmaknuːs ˈcɪsːʏrarˌsɔːn]; Old Norse: Magnús Gizurarson [ˈmɑɣnuːs ˈɡit͡surɑz̠ˌson]; c. 1175–1236) was an Icelandic Roman Catholic clergyman, who became the eighth bishop of Iceland from 1216 to 1237. He served in the diocese of Skálholt.

Magnús Gissurarson was married and had two sons.

== See also ==
- List of Skálholt bishops

Preceded by Páll Jónsson	Bishop of Skálholt; 1216–1237	Succeeded by Sigvarður Þéttmarsson
