= Bryndís Benediktsdóttir =

Icelandic academic

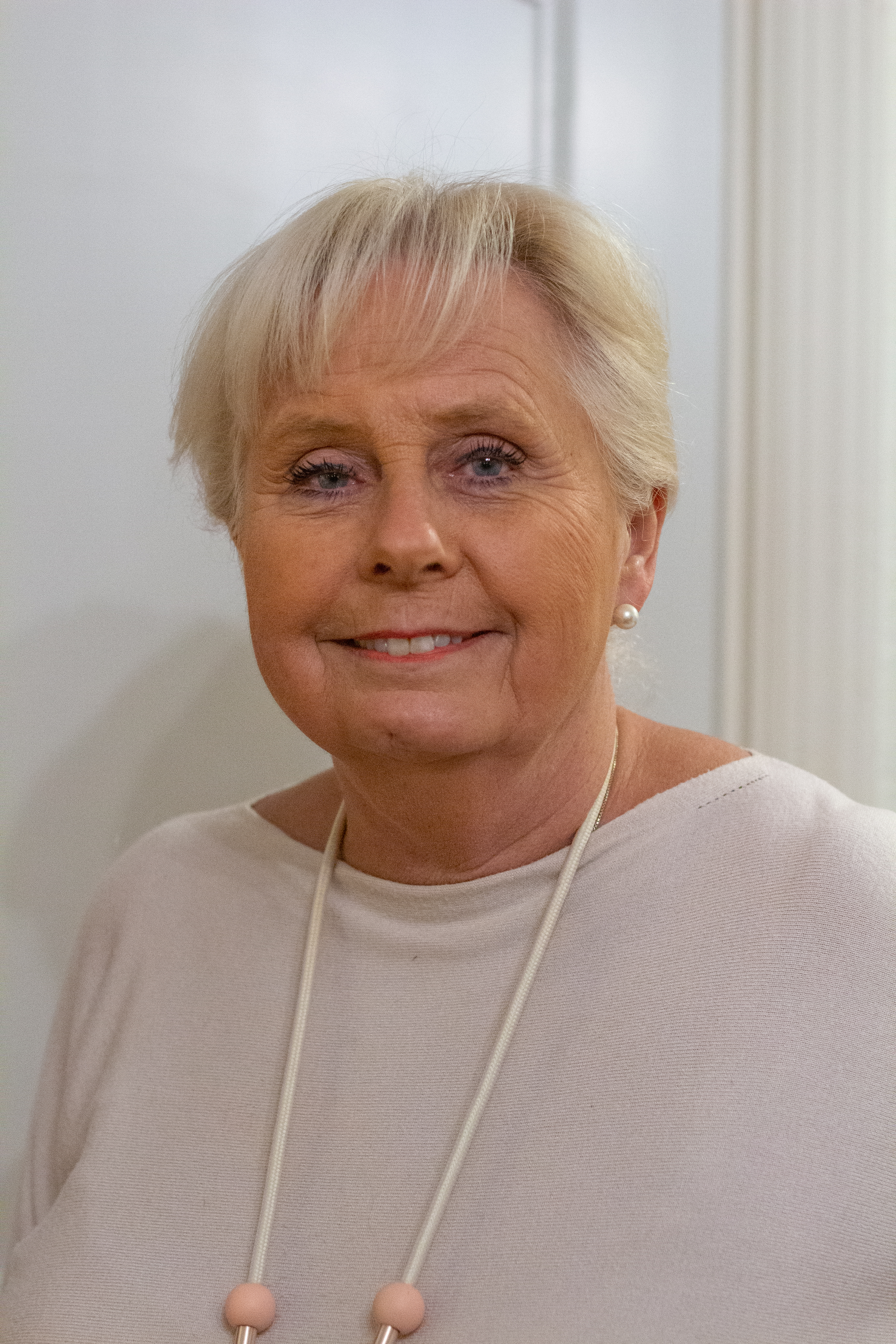
- Born: 1951 (age 74–75)
- Occupation: Professor emerita at the University of Iceland

Bryndís Benediktsdóttir (born 1951) is a professor emerita in the faculty of medicine at the University of Iceland.

== Professional career ==
Bryndís completed a matriculation examination from Reykjavik Junior College in 1971 and in the same year, began studying medicine at the University of Iceland. She completed a Cand. degree from the university in 1977 and pursued studies in general practice and internal medicine during the period 1979 to 1987 in Uppsala, Sweden. She received Specialist Rights in General Practice in Sweden 1984, in Iceland 1987 and European Specialist Rights in Sleep Medicine 2009.

In June 1987, Bryndís began work as a specialist in general practice at the Garðabær Health Centre and worked there until 2019.

Bryndís was one of the founders of the Icelandic Sleep Research Society in 1988. During the years 1997 to 1999, she worked in the sleep medicine centre of the psychiatric unit at Landspítali University Hospital at Hringbraut. She served as a consulting specialist at the sleep medicine clinic Scan-Sleep in Copenhagen during 2002–2012. From 2004 to today, Bryndís has worked on sleep research in the sleep unit at Landspítali University Hospital in Fossvogur. Bryndís began work in the faculty of medicine at the University of Iceland as a part-time lecturer in 1987, was tenured from 1991, first as assistant professor, then associate professor in 2005, and was appointed professor in 2013.

She participated in implementing, forming and strengthening teaching in communications between doctor and patient in the Faculty of Medicine at the University of Iceland; this had not been a part of the studies of medical students before she began work. The development process was conducted in collaboration with medical schools in the Nordic countries, the United States and other countries. She built up the teaching, which has been given increased weight and share in the medical studies. The studies consist in teaching and training in communications between doctor and patient, ethics, psychology, and laws relating to the work of doctors. An emphasis is placed on professionalism, dignity and humanity in the work of doctors and the focus is on the perspective of the patient in solving his/her problems, instead of focusing solely on diagnoses. Collaboration with the School of Humanities at the University of Iceland was established (Faculty of Icelandic and Comparative Cultural Studies) and imaginative literature used in teaching to enhance understanding and compassion in communications between doctor and patient, in addition to greatly strengthening ethics teaching.

== Various tasks and projects ==
During her years of work, Bryndís has held commissions of trust under the auspices of the University of Iceland. She had a seat on the faculty council of the faculty of medicine during 2004–2009 and later served as an alternate member. During the period 1998–2005, she was the representative of the University of Iceland in the Nordic Network for Education in Medical Communication and chair of the network in 2003. She was chair of the equal rights committee of the faculty of medicine 2006–2009, served on the equal rights committee of the school of health sciences 2009–2012 and on the board of RIKK – Institute for Gender, Equality and Difference 2009–2010. She was the representative of the University of Iceland in a committee on artificial insemination appointed by the Ministry of Health and served on the medical appointments committee under the auspices of the Ministry of Health from 2005.

Bryndís was a member of the editorial board of the Icelandic Medical Journal 2007–2011 and the Scandinavian Journal of Primary Health Care 1994–2005.

== Research ==
Bryndís has been a productive scientist and her research has first and foremost focused on sleep and sleep diseases, but also on the effects of heredity and environment on health. A large part of these projects has been carried out in international collaboration, particularly with researchers in the Nordic Countries and at Penn University, Philadelphia, USA. She has served as researcher and project manager in multinational research projects: BOLD, SAGIC, RHINE, RHINESSA and ECRHS. The results of her research have been published in respected international peer-reviewed medical journals, in addition to appearing in the Icelandic Medical Journal. She has held numerous lectures and has published posters at international and domestic conferences.

== Recognitions ==
Bryndís has received awards for sleep research. She received the Astra Award for Sleep Research in Primary Care in 2000 and the Wayne Hening Young Investigator Award, granted by the American Academy of Sleep Medicine and the Sleep Research Society in 2012.

== Personal life ==
Bryndís is married to Þórarinn Gíslason, professor and chief physician, and they have four children.
