= Bryndís Lára Hrafnkelsdóttir =

Icelandic footballer

Personal information
- Date of birth: 11 January 1991 (age 35)
- Place of birth: Iceland
- Position: Goalkeeper

Youth career
- –2006: KFR
- 2006–2011: Valur

Senior career*
Years	Team	Apps	(Gls)
2006	KFR/Ægir	12	(0)
2011	Breiðablik	6	(0)
2012–2016	ÍBV	90	(0)
2017	Þór/KA	35	(0)
2018	Valur	0	(0)
2018–2019	Þór/KA	35	(0)
2018	→ ÍBV	7	(0)
2020	Valur	0	(0)
2021–	Víkingur Reykjavík	0	(0)

International career^{‡}
2008	Iceland U-19	1	(0)
2012	Iceland U-23	1	(0)
2019	Iceland	1	(0)
- * Club domestic league appearances and goals as of 16 May 2021 ‡ National team caps and goals as of 16 May 2021

Bryndís Lára Hrafnkelsdóttir (born 11 January 1991) is an Icelandic footballer who plays for Víkingur Reykjavík. She debuted for the Icelandic national team in 2019.

== Club career ==
Bryndís played for ÍBV from 2012 to 2016. After her stint in Vestmannaeyjar, she moved to Þór/KA in 2017 where she helped the team win the Icelandic championship the same year. After initially deciding to take a break from football, she returned to the field in April 2018 and played with Valur in the League Cup. A month later, she signed back við Þór/KA after its main goalkeeper, Helena Jónsdóttir, got injured. After Þór/KA signed goalkeepers Johanna Henriksson and Stephanie Bukovec, Bryndís was loaned to ÍBV. She returned to Þór/KA the following season but struggled with injuries. In June 2020, she signed with Valur.

In February 2021, Bryndís signed with Víkingur Reykjavík.
