= Páll Jónsson =

Icelandic Roman Catholic clergyman

Páll Jónsson (Old Norse: [ˈpɑːlː ˈjoːnsˌson], Modern Icelandic: [ˈpʰautl̥ ˈjounsɔn]; 1155 – November 29, 1211) was an Icelandic Roman Catholic clergyman, who became the seventh bishop of Iceland from 1195 to 1211. He served in the diocese of Skálholt. His life is recorded in Páls saga biskups.

Páll was a descendant of the Oddaverjar family clan.

He is known as a patron of the celebrated artist Margret hin haga (Margaret the Dextrous).

== See also ==
- List of Skálholt bishops

Preceded by Þorlákur helgi Þórhallsson	Bishop of Skálholt; 1195–1211	Succeeded by Magnús Gissurarson
