= Skálholt Cathedral =

- Skálholtsdómkirkja
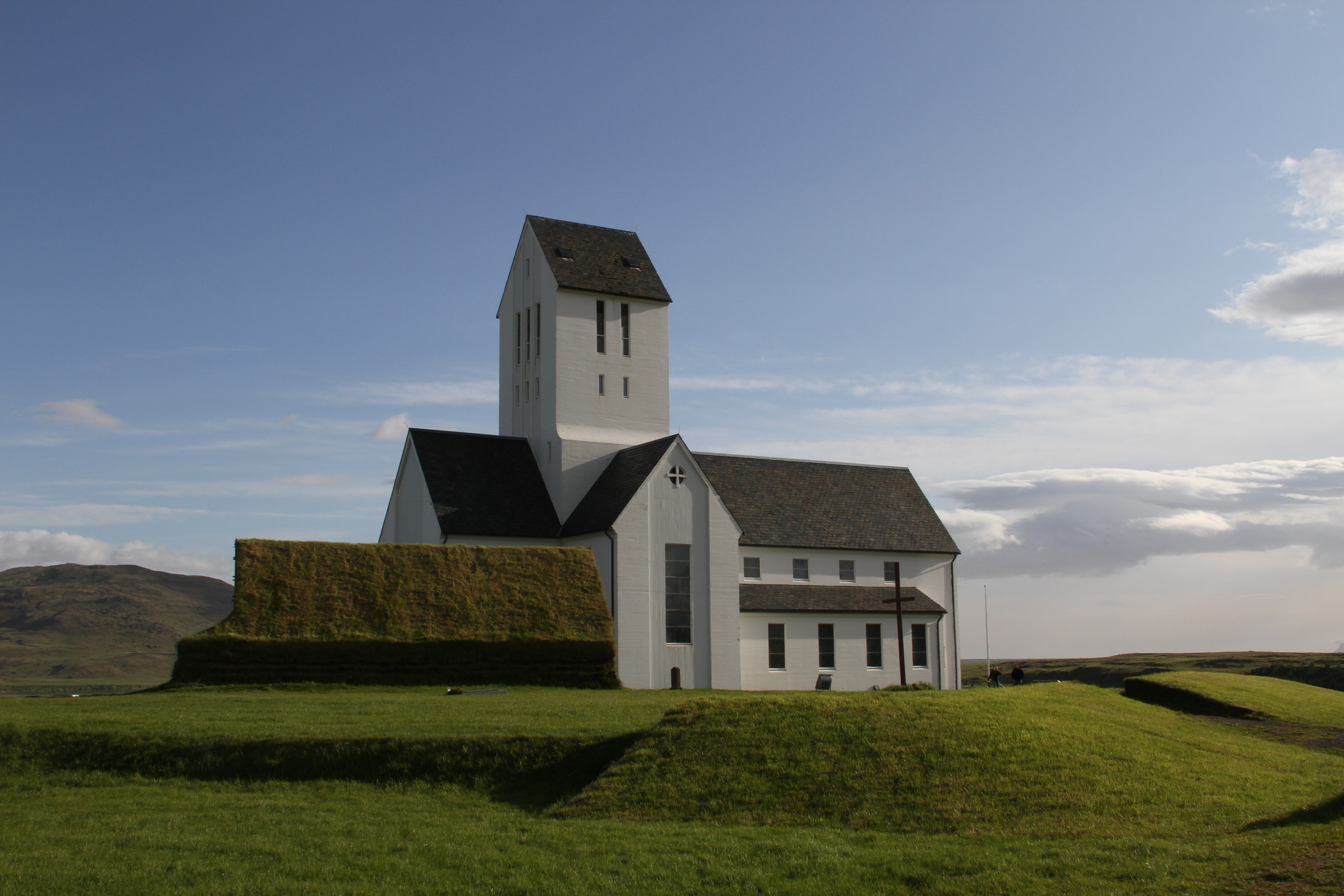
- Skálholt Cathedral
- 64°07′31″N 20°31′28″W
- Location: Skálholt
- Country: Iceland
- Denomination: Church of Iceland
- Churchmanship: Evangelical Lutheran

History
- Status: Active
- Consecrated: 1963

Architecture
- Functional status: Cathedral church
- Years built: 1956–1963
- Groundbreaking: 1956

Specifications
- Length: 30 m (98 ft 5 in)

Administration
- Diocese: Skálholt

Clergy
- Bishop: Kristján Björnsson

Skálholt Cathedral (Icelandic: Skálholtsdómkirkja) is a Church of Iceland cathedral church. The church is the official church of the Bishop of Skálholt, currently Kristján Björnsson. It is located in Skálholt, the former religious, cultural and educational center of early Iceland.

== History ==
A large cathedral church was constructed at Skálholt in the 12th century, following the establishment of the bishopric in 1056.

Several buildings were later constructed on the same site. Most of these were wooden structures built with imported products from Norway. Some of the churches burned down; some were destroyed by bad weather, others by earthquakes or neglect. Some churches and cathedrals were much larger than the present memorial cathedral’s 30 meters, as much as 50 meters long.

The current cathedral was designed by the Icelandic State Architect Hörður Bjarnason. It stands on the site of nine previous churches that had stood on the exact site throughout the 1000 years since the establishment of the diocese.

Today's Skálholt Cathedral was built between 1956 and 1963 to commemorate the 900 years since the diocese was founded in 1056.

The cornerstone of the present cathedral was laid in 1956 by Bishop Sigurbjörn Einarsson. The cathedral was consecrated in 1963.

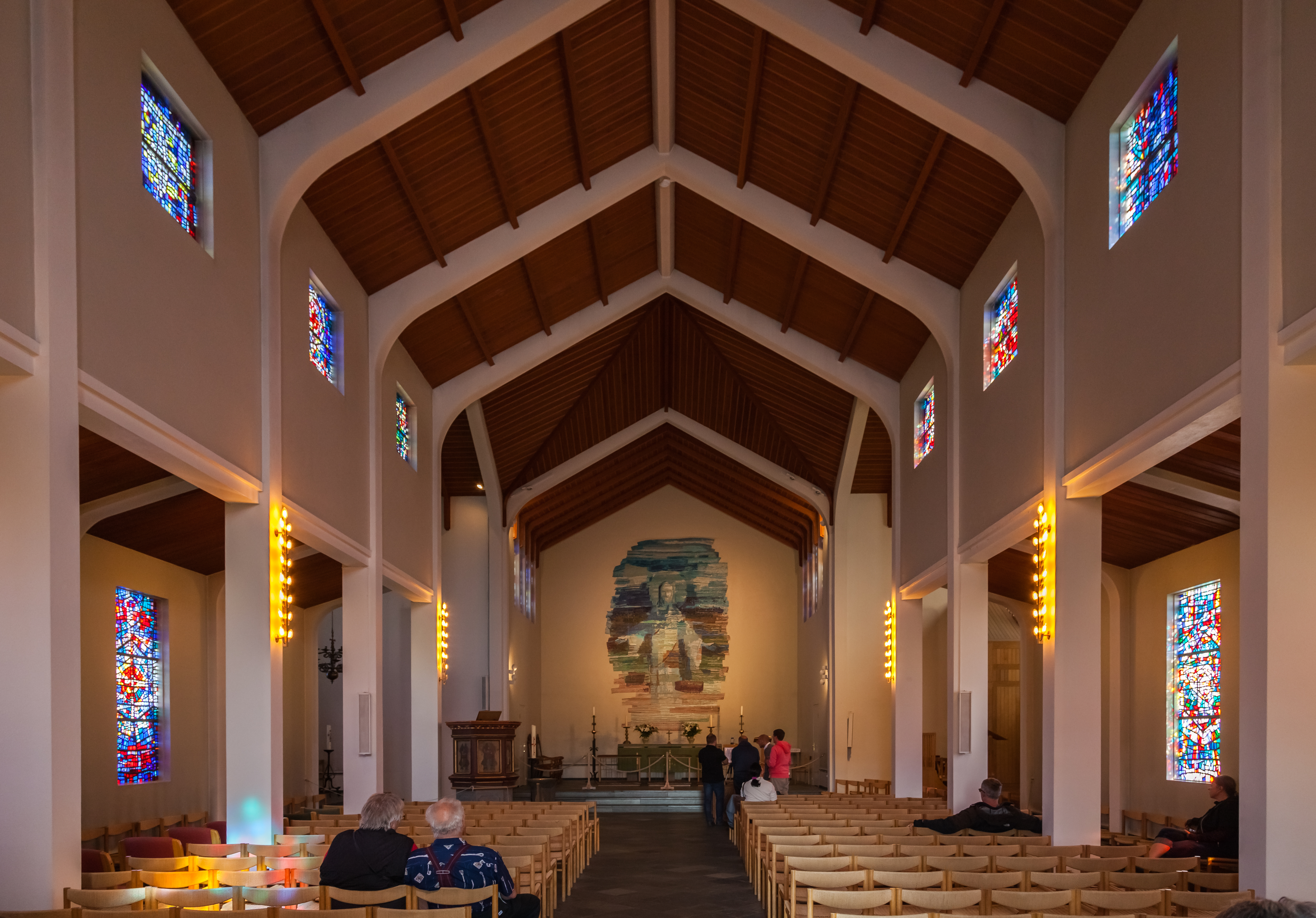
Interior of the cathedral

== Interior ==
The cathedral contains a total of 25 stained glass windows made by Gerður Helgadóttir.

They are designed in an abstract manner and depict Christian symbolism and some of the medieval bishops of Skálholt.

The altarpiece is the work of Nína Tryggvadóttir and depicts Christ coming into the cathedral with the landscape behind depicting Iceland.

The pulpit dates from the 17th century and is the one used by Bishop Brynjólfur Sveinsson in 1650.

== Archaeology ==
Excavations undertaken prior to the construction of the present cathedral uncovered a stone sarcophagus believed to contain the remains of Páll Jónsson, Bishop of Skálholt, who died in 1211. The discovery is considered one of the most significant archaeological finds relating to Iceland’s medieval church.

== Administration ==
Even though the cathedral contains the seat of the bishop, Skálholt is no longer a diocese in its own right. The Diocese of Skálholt was dissolved in 1801, but a suffragan see was re-established in 1909 for a bishop who assists the Bishop of Iceland. The Bishop of Skálholt is nevertheless responsible for cathedral affairs.

== See also ==
- List of cathedrals in Iceland
