= Dedication (ritual) =

Ceremony to mark an opening or completion

Dedication is a ceremony to mark the official completion or opening of something. Such rituals include ceremonial ship launching and a variety of events for buildings including builders' rites or an opening ceremony. Many religions have specific dedication rituals, which serve to consecrate items, places, or people to sacred purpose, such as the dedication of churches or Child dedication.

== Feast of Dedication ==
The Feast of Dedication, today Hanukkah, once also called the "Feast of the Maccabees", is a Jewish festival observed for eight days from the 25th of Kislev (usually in December, but occasionally late November, due to the lunisolar calendar). It was instituted in the year 165 B.C. by Judas Maccabeus, his brothers, and the elders of the congregation of Israel in commemoration of the reconsecration of the Jewish Temple in Jerusalem, and especially of the altar of burnt offerings, after they had been desecrated during the persecution under Antiochus Epiphanes (168 BC). The significant happenings of the festival were the illumination of houses and synagogues, a custom probably taken over from the Feast of Tabernacles, and the recitation of Psalm 30:1–12. According to the Second Book of Chronicles, the dedication of Solomon's Temple took place in the week before the Feast of Tabernacles. Julius Wellhausen suggests that the feast was originally connected with the winter solstice, and only afterwards with the events narrated in Maccabees.

The Feast of Dedication is also mentioned in John 10:22, where the writer mentions Jesus being at the Jerusalem Temple during "the Feast of Dedication" and further notes "and it was winter". The Greek term used in John is "the renewals" (Greek τὰ ἐγκαίνια, ta enkainia). Josephus refers to the festival in Greek simply as "lights".

== Dedication of churches ==
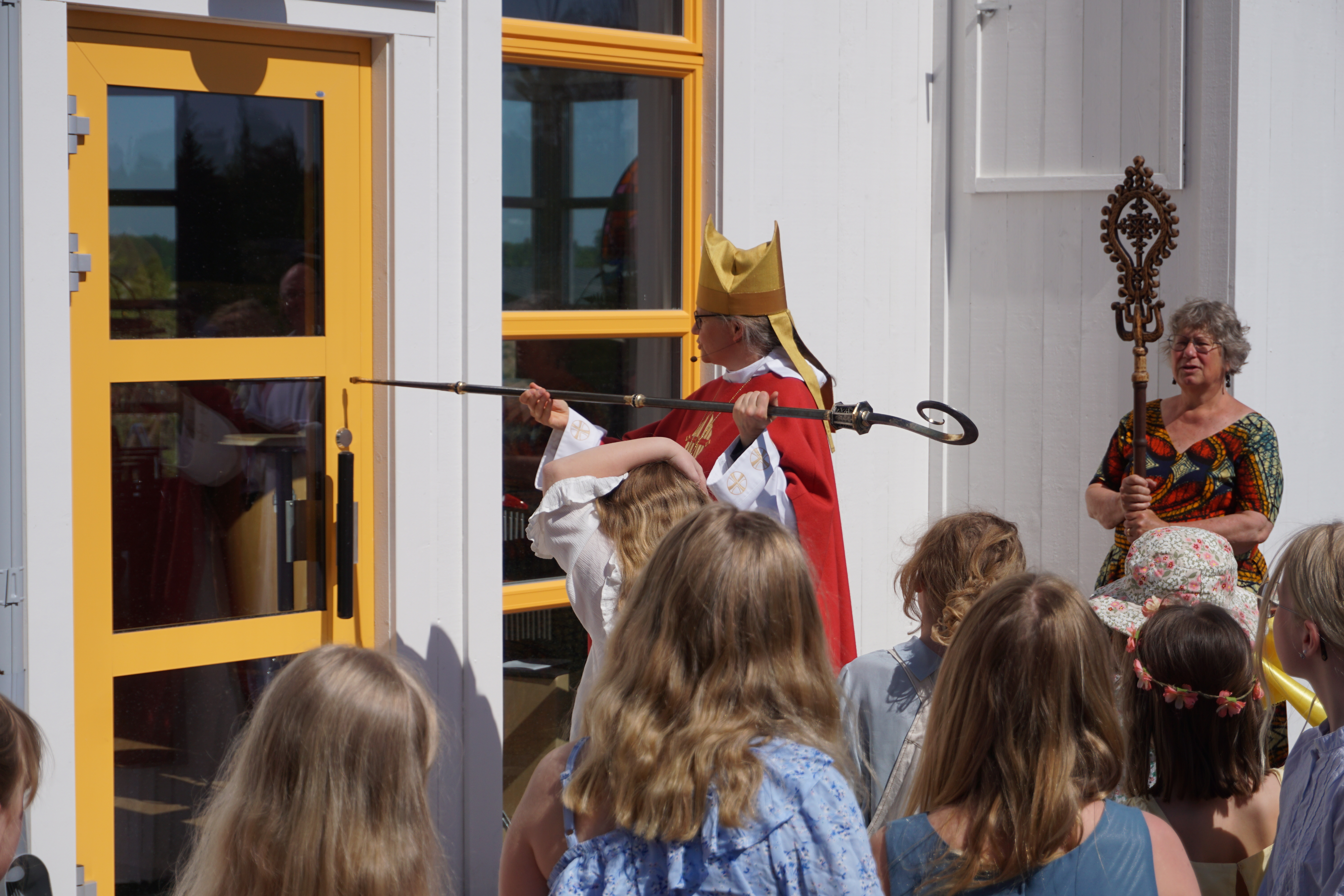
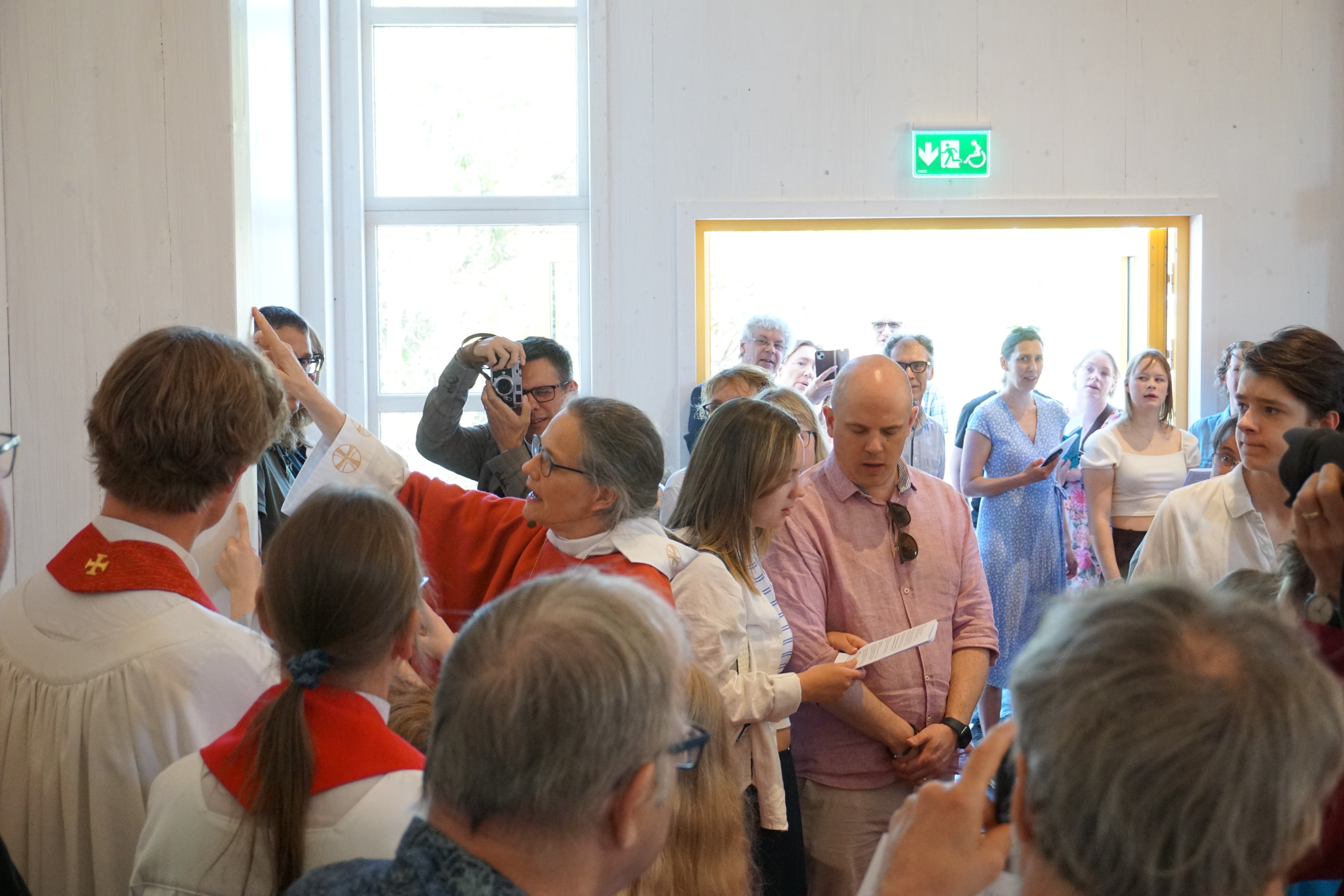
The dedication of Storvreta Evangelical-Lutheran Church by Bishop Karin Johannesson, the Bishop of Uppsala of the Church of Sweden, on Pentecost Day 2024; in Evangelical-Lutheran practice, the bishop knocks three times on the door of the church that is being dedicated with his/her crozier while praying Psalm 23 (left photograph). The bishop anoints the four walls of the church with Holy Chrism in the dedication of churches (right photograph).

Dedication of churches is a Christian dedication ceremony of a church building. Churches under the authority of a bishop are usually dedicated by that office holder.

== Child dedication ==
A child dedication ceremony takes place in some Christian churches that practice adult baptism. The child is presented to the congregation, and vows are made to raise him or her in the Christian tradition (similar to an infant baptism ceremony), but the child is not baptised, as some churches only accept adult or "believers" baptism.

== Dedication of a marriage or relationship ==
Some denominations offer a dedication for a marriage or relationship. A service of dedication is used in the Church of England to bless a couple after a civil marriage. The Church of England's Diocese of Hereford "voted to support a motion calling on the House of Bishops to 'commend an Order of Prayer and Dedication after the registration of a civil partnership or a same sex marriage'". Individual Anglican congregations in England may already offer same-sex couples "a special service of prayer and dedication".

== See also ==
- Consecration
- Cornerstone
- Ex-voto
- Opening ceremony
- Solomon's Temple § Dedication
