= Johan (archbishop of Uppsala) =

Johan or Jöns (Latin: Johannes, English: John) was the name of several archbishops of Uppsala:

- Johan (archbishop of Uppsala, died 1187)
- Johan Odulfsson (died 1284)
- Johan (archbishop of Uppsala, died 1291)
- Jöns Gerekesson (archbishop 1408–1421)
- Johan Håkansson (archbishop 1421–1432)
- Jöns Bengtsson Oxenstierna (archbishop 1448–1467)
- Johannes Magnus (archbishop 1523–1544)
- Johannes Canuti Lenaeus (archbishop 1647–1669)
- Johan Baazius the younger (archbishop 1677–1681)
- Johannes Steuchius (archbishop 1730–1742)
- Johan Olof Wallin (archbishop 1837–1839)
- Johan August Ekman (archbishop 1900–1913)
