= Dedication of churches =

Christian consecration of a building

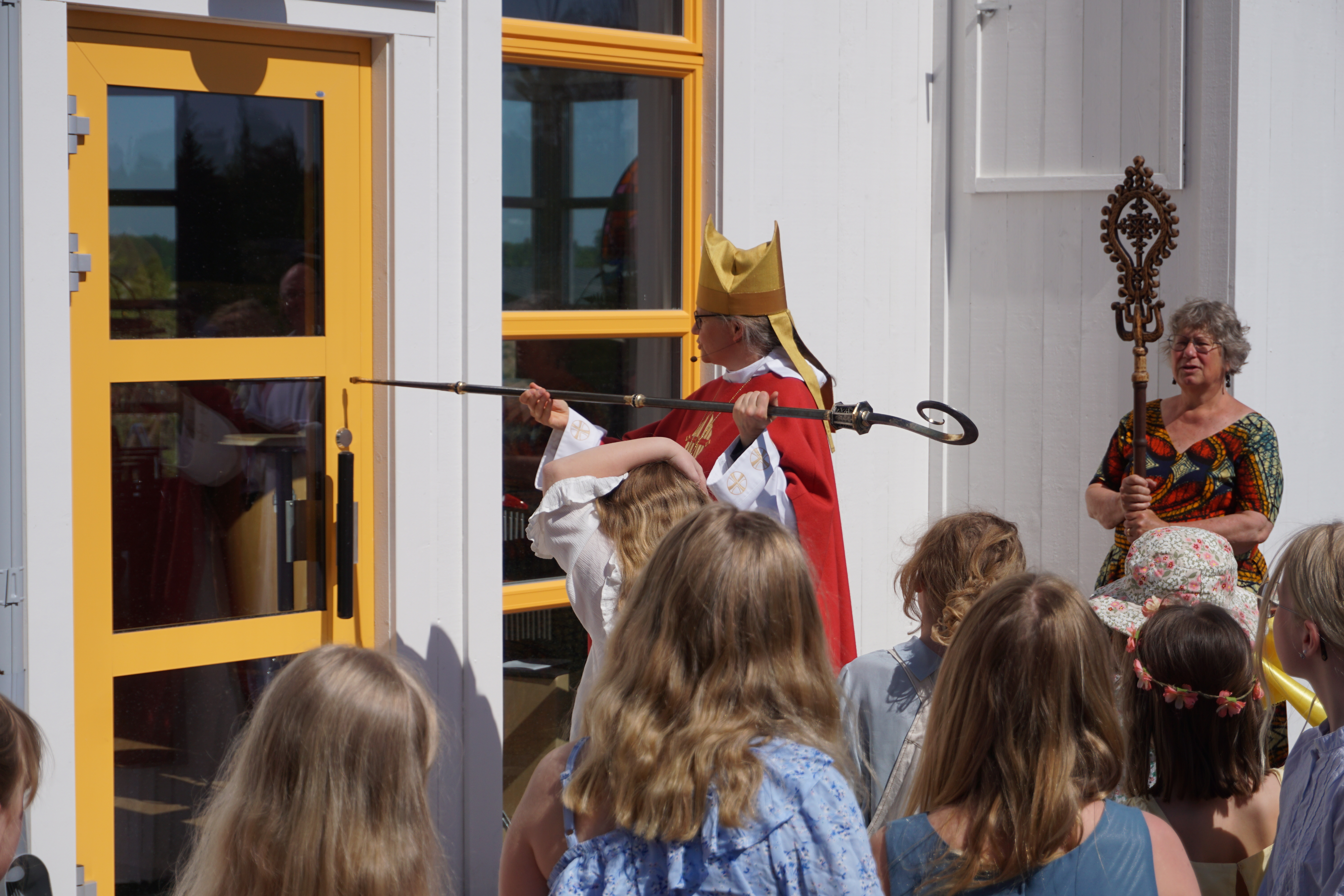
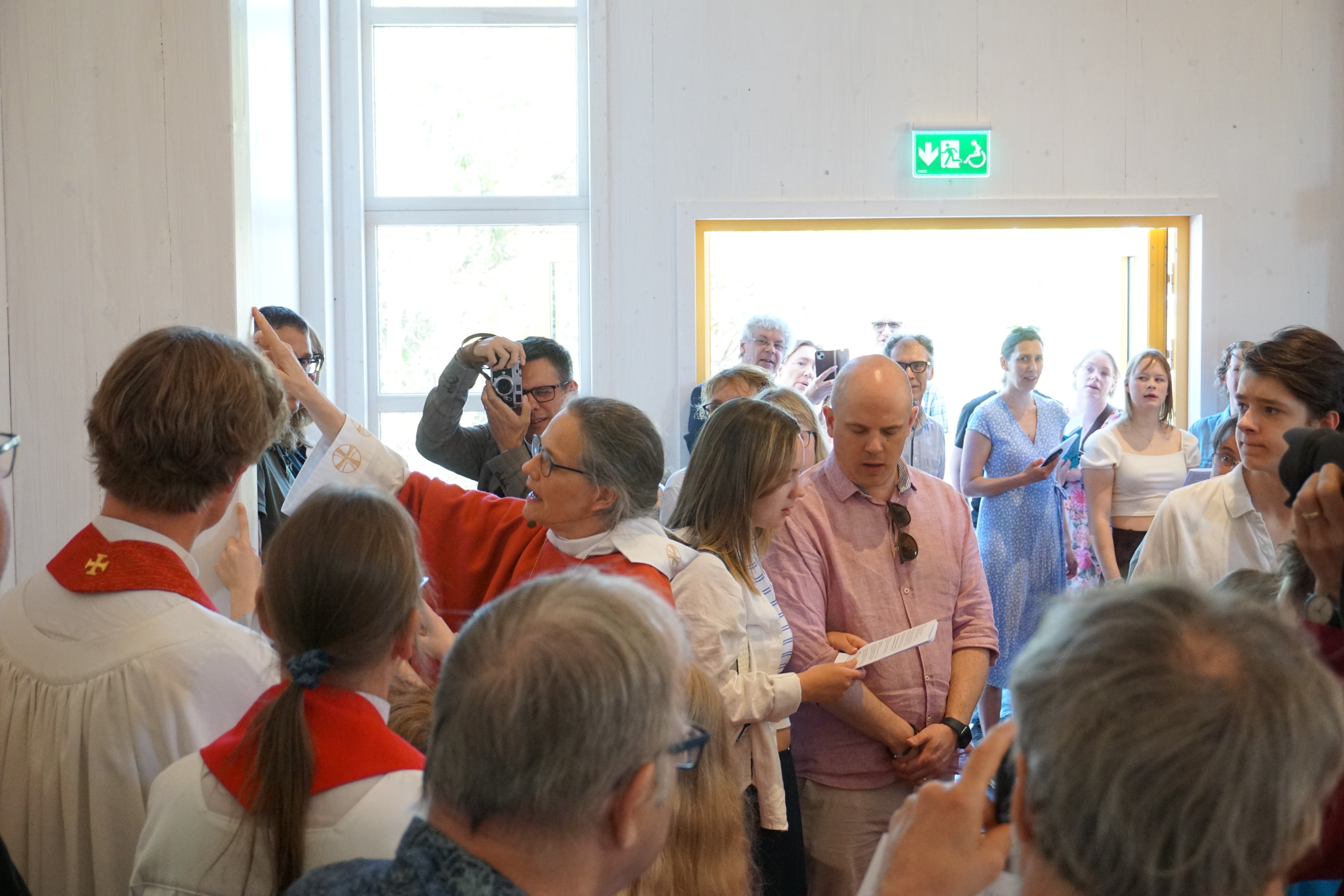
The dedication of Storvreta Evangelical-Lutheran Church by Bishop Karin Johannesson, the Bishop of Uppsala of the Church of Sweden, on Pentecost Day 2024; in Evangelical-Lutheran practice, the bishop knocks three times on the door of the church that is being dedicated with his/her crozier while praying Psalm 23 (left photograph). The bishop anoints the four walls of the church with Holy Chrism in the dedication of churches (right photograph).

Dedication of churches is a Christian dedication ceremony of a church building. Churches under the authority of a bishop are usually dedicated by that office holder.

== Consecration ==
=== Early customs ===
The custom of solemnly dedicating or consecrating buildings as churches or chapels set apart for Christian worship must be almost as old as Christianity itself. When we come to the earlier part of the 4th century allusions to and descriptions of the consecration of churches become plentiful.

This service is probably of Jewish origin: the hallowing of the tabernacle and of its furniture and ornaments (Exodus 40); the dedication of Solomon's Temple (I Kings 8) and of the Second Temple by Zerubbabel (Ezra 6); its rededication by Judas Maccabaeus (see above); the dedication of the temple of Herod the Great; and Jesus' attendance at the Feast of Dedication (John 10:22–23). All these point to the probability of the Christians deriving their custom from a Jewish origin.

Eusebius of Caesarea speaks of the dedication of churches rebuilt after the Diocletian persecution, including the church at Tyre in 314 AD. The consecrations of the Church of the Holy Sepulchre at Jerusalem in 335, which had been built by Constantine I, and of other churches after his time, are described both by Eusebius and by other ecclesiastical historians. From them we gather that every consecration was accompanied by a celebration of the Holy Eucharist and a sermon, and special prayers of a dedicatory character, but there is no trace of the elaborate ritual of the medieval pontificals dating from the 8th century onwards.

The separate consecration of altars is provided for by Canon 14 of the Council of Agde in 506, and by Canon 26 of the Council of Epaone in 517, the latter containing the first known reference to the usage of anointing the altar with chrism. The use of both holy water and of unction is attributed to St. Columbanus, who died in 615.

There was an annual commemoration of the original dedication of the church, a feast with its octave extending over eight days, during which Gregory the Great encouraged the erection of booths and general feasting on the part of the populace, to compensate them for, and in some way to take the place of, abolished pagan festivities.

At an early date the right to consecrate churches was reserved to bishops, as by a canon of the First Council of Bracara in 563, and by the 23rd of the Irish collections of canons, once attributed to St Patrick, but hardly to be put earlier than the 8th century.

=== Practice by Christian denomination ===
==== Eastern Orthodox form ====
The dedication service of the Eastern Orthodox Church is likewise long and elaborate. At the beginning of construction, the bishop or his deputy blesses a cornerstone for the church. Relics may be placed inside the cornerstone, and it will be topped with a plate giving the name of the patron saint of the new church, the names of the saints whose relics were deposited in the cornerstone (if any), the name of the ruling bishop, and the date.

After all construction on the building is finished, preparations are made for the solemn consecration of the church. The relics which will be placed in the Holy Table (altar) and the antimension are to be prepared and guarded on the previous day in some neighboring church (if there is no neighboring church, the relics are placed on a small table in front of the icon of Christ on the iconostasion). The night before the consecration, an all-night vigil is celebrated; however, no one will enter the altar (sanctuary) of the new church yet, and the Holy Doors remain closed.

On the morning of the consecration, everything needed for the consecration, the sacred vessels, and all of the appurtenances of the sanctuary (altar cloths, candlesticks, etc.) are prepared on a table placed in front of the Holy Doors, together with a Gospel Book and blessing cross. The bishop (or his representative) and clergy vest and proceed to the church. The clergy carry the table into the sanctuary and literally construct the Holy Table: the mensa (table top) is placed on the four pillars and four nails are driven in with stones. A prayer of dedication is said, followed by an ektenia (litany). Warm water is poured thrice upon the Holy Table, and it is wiped down by the priests, and then washed with a mixture of rose water and red wine (signifying baptism). It is then anointed with chrism in the form of a cross (signifying chrismation). The altar, the Gospel Book, and the altar cloths are then censed, every pillar is crossed (anointed in the sign of the cross) with chrism, while various hymns and psalms are chanted. The sanctuary lamp is then filled with oil and lit, and placed on or above the altar, while clergy bring in other lamps and other ornaments of the church.

Then, the bishop and clergy go to the neighboring church where the relics have been kept and guarded. A procession is formed and advances thence with the relics, which are borne by a priest in a diskos (paten) on his head; the church having been entered, the relics are placed by him with much ceremonial in the confession (the recess prepared in or under the altar for their reception) which is then anointed and sealed up. After this the Divine Liturgy is celebrated both on the day of dedication and on seven days afterwards.

==== Catholic form ====
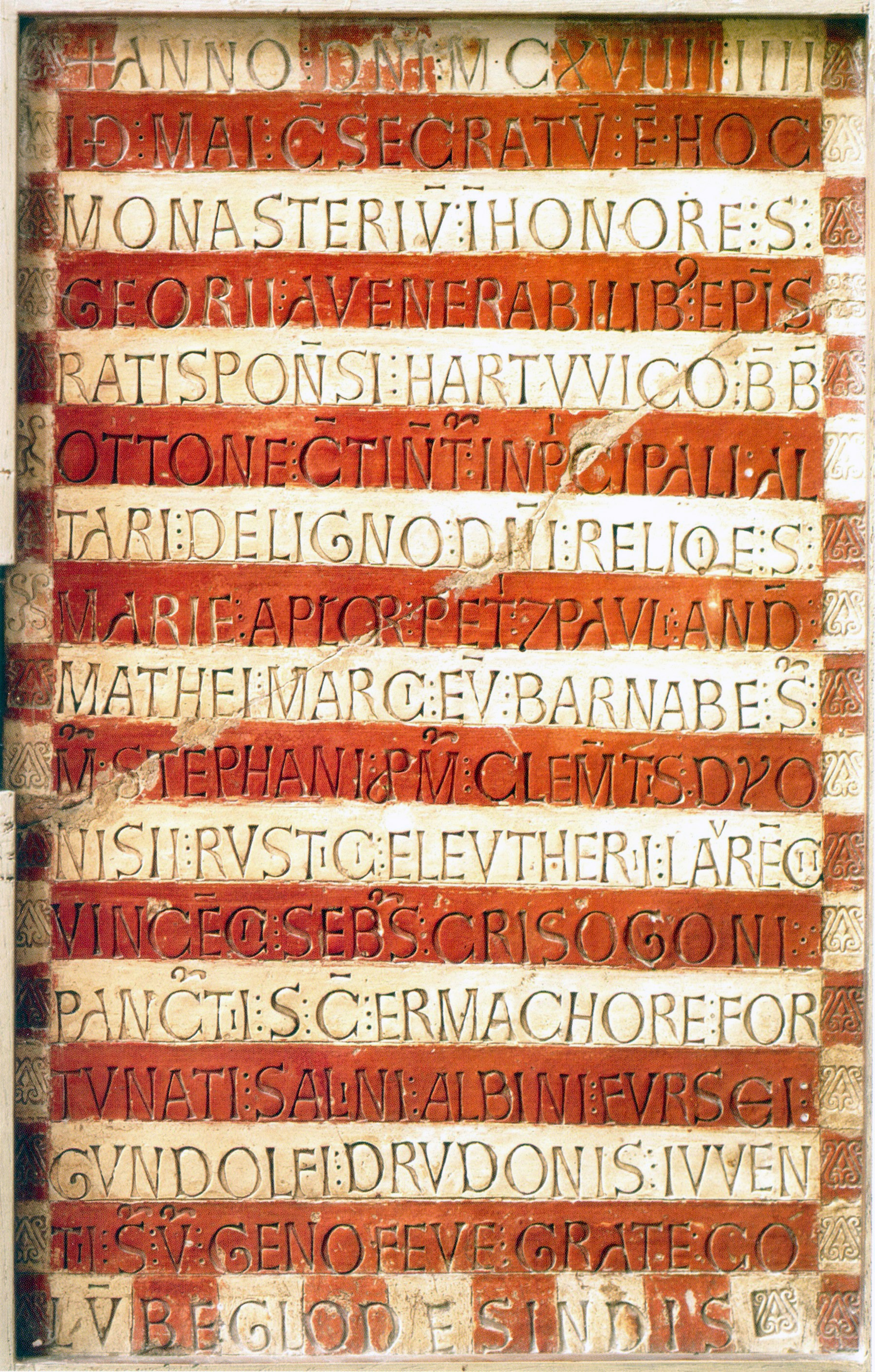
Latin dedicatory inscription of 1119 for the church of Prüfening Abbey, Germany

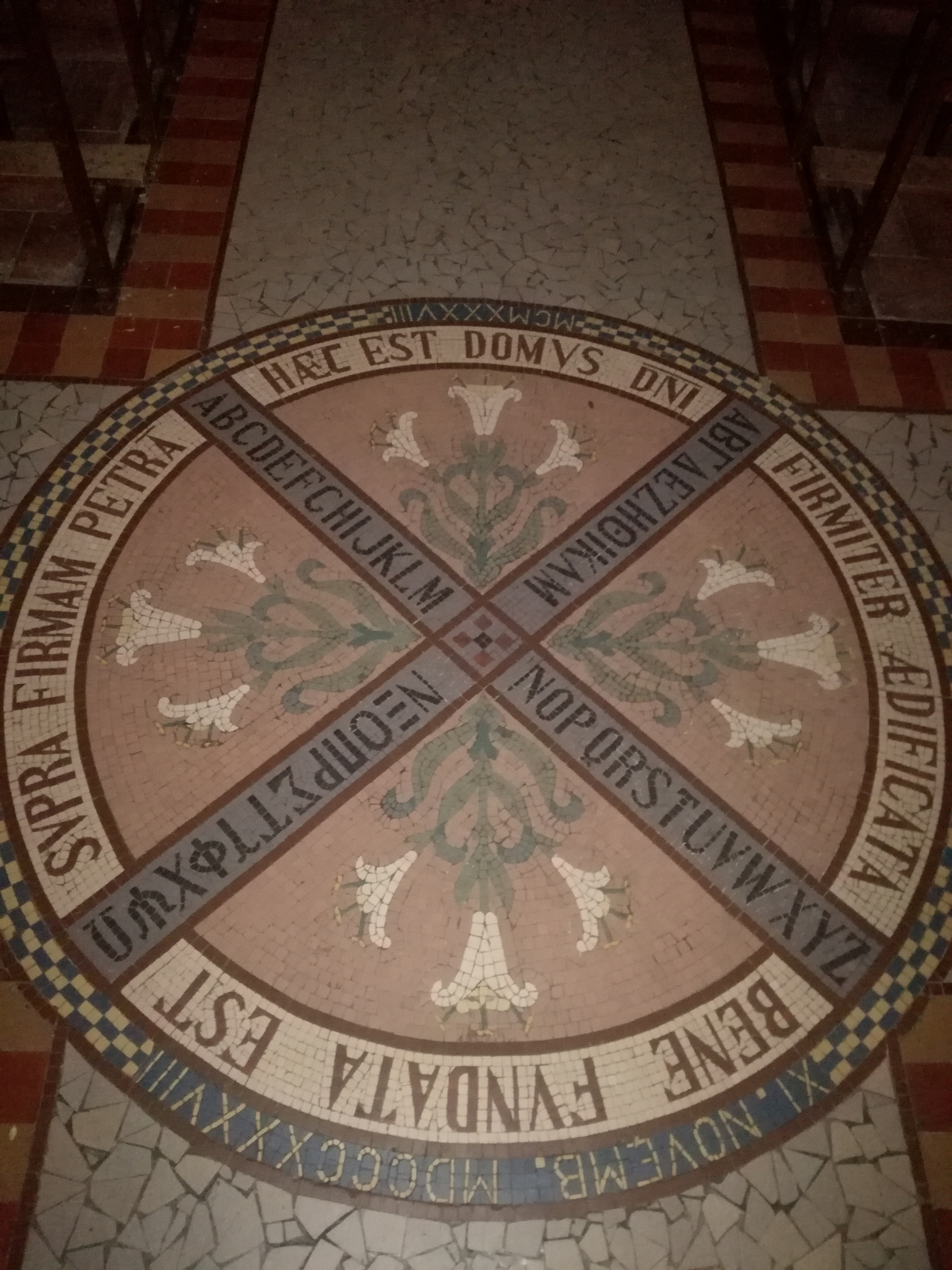
Mosaic showing the Greek and Latin alphabets in Notre-Dame de la Daurade, France

For the Catholic Church, the rite of dedication is described in the Caeremoniale Episcoporum, chapters IX-X, and in the Roman Missal's Ritual Masses for the Dedication of a Church and an Altar.

The manuscripts and printed service-books of the medieval church contain a lengthy and elaborate service for the consecration of churches in the pontifical. The earliest known pontifical is that of Egbert, Archbishop of York (732–766), which, however, only survives in a 10th-century manuscript copy. Later pontificals are numerous and somewhat varied. A good idea of the general character of the service can be obtained from a skeleton of it as performed in England after the Reformation according to the use of Sarum. The service is taken from an early 15th-century pontifical in the Cambridge University Library as printed by W. Makell in Monumenta ritualia ecclesiae Anglicanae.

There is a preliminary office for laying a foundation-stone. On the day of consecration the bishop is to vest in a tent outside the church, then proceed to the door of the church on the outside, a single deacon being inside the church. There he blesses holy water, twelve lighted candles being placed outside, and twelve inside the church. He then sprinkles the walls all round outside and knocks at the door. He then sprinkles the walls all round outside a second time, then a third time, knocking at the door each time. He may then enter, all laity being excluded. The bishop then fixes a cross in the centre of the church, after which the litany is said, including a special clause for the consecration of the church and altar. Next the bishop inscribes the alphabet in Greek letters on one of the limbs of St Andrews cross from the left east corner to the right west corner on the pavement cindered for the purpose, and the alphabet in Latin on the other limb from the right east corner to the left west corner. He then genuflects before the altar or cross, blesses water, mingled with salt, ashes and wine, and sprinkles it on all the walls of the church inside thrice, beginning at the altar. He next sprinkles the centre of the church lengthwise and crosswise on the pavement and goes round the outside of the church sprinkling it three times. Next, reentering the church and taking up a central position, he sprinkles holy water to the four points of the compass, and up towards the roof. Next he anoints the twelve internal and twelve external wall-crosses with chrism before walking around the church three times inside and out and censing it.

Then there follows the consecration of the altar. First, holy water is blessed and mixed with chrism. With the mixture the bishop makes a cross in the middle of the altar, then on the right and on the left, then on the four horns of the altar. The altar is then sprinkled seven times or three times with water not mixed with chrism and the altar table is washed, censed and wiped with a linen cloth. The centre of the altar is next anointed with the oil of the catechumens in the form of a cross. After the altar stone has been anointed with chrism, the whole altar is rubbed over with oil of the catechumens and with chrism. Incense is next blessed, and the altar censed, five grains of incense being placed crosswise in the centre and at the four corners. On the grains, five slender candle crosses are placed and lit. Afterwards the altar is scraped and cleansed. The altar cloths and ornaments are sprinkled with holy water and placed on the altar, which is then to be censed. All this is subsidiary to the celebration of Mass, with which the whole service is concluded. The transcription and description of the various collects, psalms, anthems and benedictions which make up the order of dedication have been omitted.

The Sarum order of dedication described above is substantially identical with the Roman order. There is, however, one very important and significant piece of ritual, not found in the English church order, but always found in the Roman service, and not infrequently found in the earlier and later English uses, in connection with the presence and use of relics at the consecration of an altar. According to the Roman ritual, after the priest has sprinkled the walls of the church inside three times all round and then sprinkled the pavement from the altar to the porch, and sideways from wall to wall, and then to the four quarters of the compass, he prepares some cement at the altar. He then goes to the place where the relics are kept, and starts a solemn procession with the relics round the outside of the church. There a sermon is preached and two decrees of the council of Trent are read together with the founder's deed of gift or endowment. Then the bishop, anointing the door with chrism, enters the church with the relics and deposits them in the cavity or confession in the altar. Having been enclosed they are censed and covered in, and the cover is anointed. Then follows the censing and wiping of the altar as in the Sarum order.

This use of relics is very ancient and can be traced back to the time of St Ambrose. There was also a custom, now obsolete, of enclosing a portion of the consecrated Eucharist if relics were not obtainable. This was ordered by cap. 2 of the council of Celchyth (Chelsea) in 816. But though ancient, the custom of enclosing relics was not universal, and where found in English church orders, as it frequently is found from the pontifical of Egbert onwards, it is called the Mos Romanus as distinguished from the Mos Anglicanus (Archaeologia, liv. 416). It is absent from the description of the early Irish form of consecration preserved in the Leabhar Breac, translated and annotated by Rev. T. Olden.

The curious ritual act, technically known as the abecedarium, i.e. the tracing of the alphabet, sometimes in Latin characters, sometimes in Latin and Greek, sometimes, according to Ménard, in Latin, Greek and Hebrew, along the limbs of St Andrews cross on the floor of the church, can be traced back to the 8th century and may be even older. Its origin and meaning are unknown. One explanation was suggested by Rossi and adopted by the bishop of Salisbury. This interprets the St Andrew's cross as the initial Greek letter of Christus, and the whole act as significant of taking possession of the site to be consecrated in the name of Christ, who is the Alpha and Omega, the word of God, combining in himself all letters that lie between them, every element of human speech. The three languages may then have been suggested by the Latin, Greek and Hebrew, in which his title was written on the cross.

The disentangling the Gallican from the Roman elements in the early Western forms of service was undertaken by Louis Duchesne, who shows how the former partook of a funerary and the latter of a baptismal character.

===== Naming a church =====
The way in which a Catholic church was officially given a name evolved in time. In England (with Cornwall) and Wales, the earliest churches were named after saints, and often after their founders, who, if eventually canonised, seamlessly became the patron saint of the church. Later on, churches were also dedicated to, and named for, the saints whose relics were displayed within. Double dedications were based on the traditional association of two saints (i.e. SS Peter and Paul), or by the addition of a patron saint after the acquisition of relics, or by additional adoption of a universally recognised patron saint for a church initially dedicated to a local one. The choice of the patron saint sometimes had to do with a connection between his or her attributes and those of the physical environment of the church, such as seafaring saints for churches located in ports, with the noted peculiarity that saints whose life details were the least known enjoyed the widest popularity in being chosen (i.e. St George and St Margaret).

==== Evangelical-Lutheran form ====
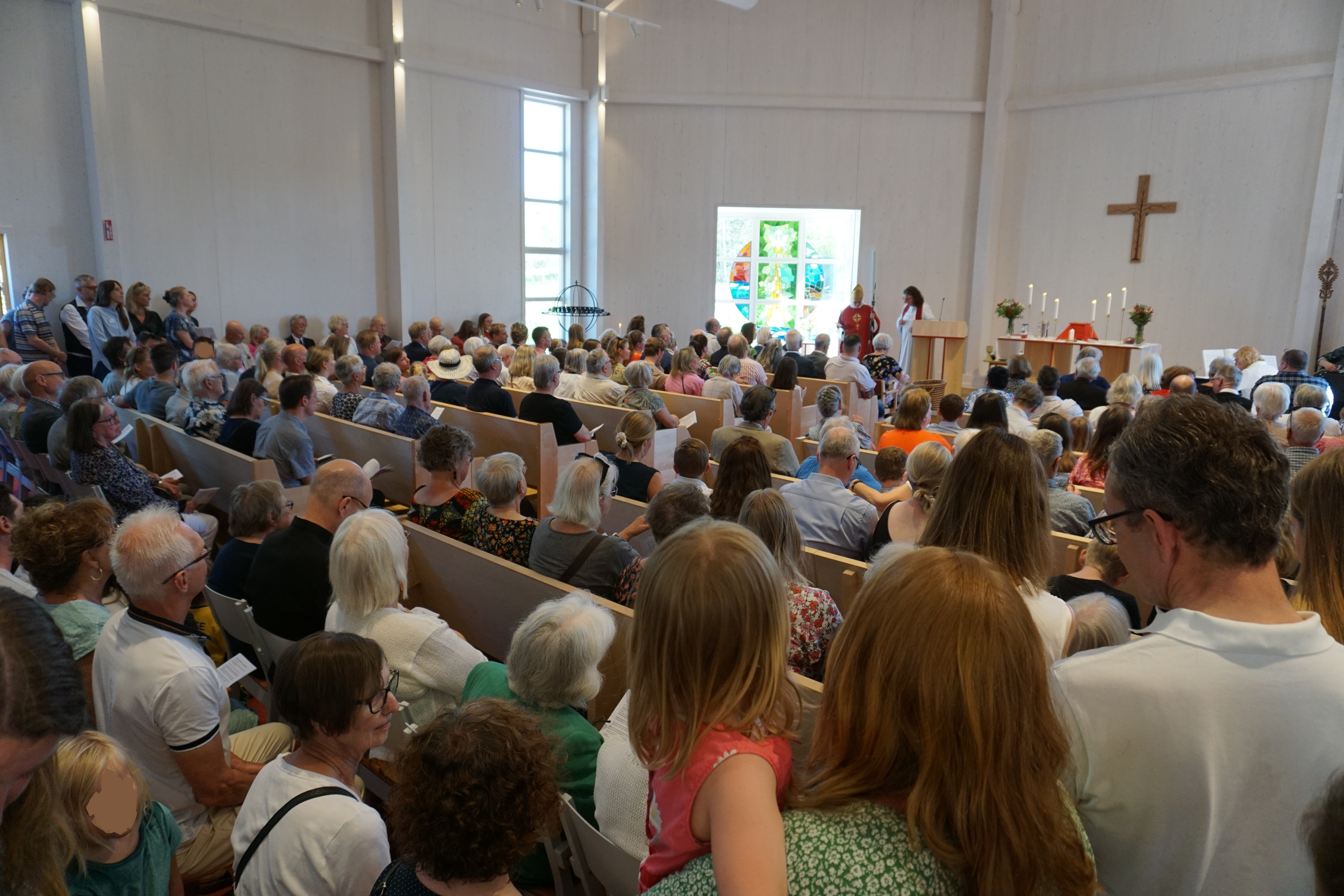
The celebration of the Dedication Mass of Storvreta Evangelical-Lutheran Church by Bishop Karin Johannesson, the Bishop of Uppsala of the Church of Sweden, on Pentecost Day 2024.

In the Evangelical-Lutheran Churches of the historic episcopate, the dedication of a church includes the bishop knocking on the door of the church three times, followed by the blessing of the baptismal font, communion rail, organ and pews.

==== Anglican forms ====
There is no authorized form for the dedication of a church in the reformed Church of England. A form was drawn up and approved by both houses of the convocation of Canterbury under Archbishop Tenison in 1712, and an almost identical form was submitted to convocation in 1715, but its consideration was not completed by the Lower House, and neither form ever received royal sanction.

The consequence has been that Anglican bishops have fallen back on their undefined jus liturgicum, and have drawn up and promulgated forms for use in their various dioceses, some of them being content to borrow from other dioceses for this purpose. There is a general similarity, with a certain amount of difference in detail, in these various forms. In the Diocese of London the bishop, attended by clergy and churchwardens, receives outside the west door a petition for consecration; the procession then moves round the whole church outside, while certain psalms are chanted. On again reaching the west door the bishop knocks thrice with his crozier, and the door being opened the procession advances to the east end of the church, where prayers are said and the first Eucharist celebrated.

==== Methodist forms ====
The Methodist Book of Worship for Church and Home (1965) has the following Christian liturgies with respect to dedications: "An Office for the Dedication of a Church Building", "An Office for the Dedication of a School, College, or University Building", "An Office for the Dedication of a Hospital", "An Office for the Dedication of a Church Organ or Other Instruments for Sacred Music", and "An Office for the Dedication of a Memorial".

In its ritual found in the Discipline, the Allegheny Wesleyan Methodist Connection includes a rite for the dedication of churches, as well as one for the dedication of parsonages.

The Evangelical Wesleyan Church, in "The Ritual" part of its Discipline, contains a liturgy for the Dedication of Churches.

==== Irvingian forms ====
In the New Apostolic Church, the largest of the Irvingian Churches, a new church is dedicated during the celebration of the first Divine Service held therein. The Catechsim of the New Apostolic Church teaches:

The dedication service is based upon a Bible text that is in keeping with the occasion. The introductory words of the officiant express gratitude to God. In most cases, thanks is also expressed to the members for their willingness to make sacrifices, thus enabling the church to be built, as well as to all those who worked on its construction. The congregation's historical development is likewise addressed.

In the dedication prayer, the house of God is dedicated to its sacred purpose in the name of the triune God. Thus the new church is consecrated as a place where the Holy Spirit reveals Himself. Here the word of God will henceforth be proclaimed, and here the sacraments will be dispensed. All activities performed in this house are to serve for the perfection of souls longing for salvation, and to prepare them for the return of Jesus Christ. The church building and all who gather there are commended to God's protection and to the service of His angels.

The dedicated church is now a place for the worship of God and a sanctuary for those who seek salvation. It serves to offer them divine comfort, strength of faith, and peace of the soul in the divine services.

==== Baptist and Pentecostal forms ====
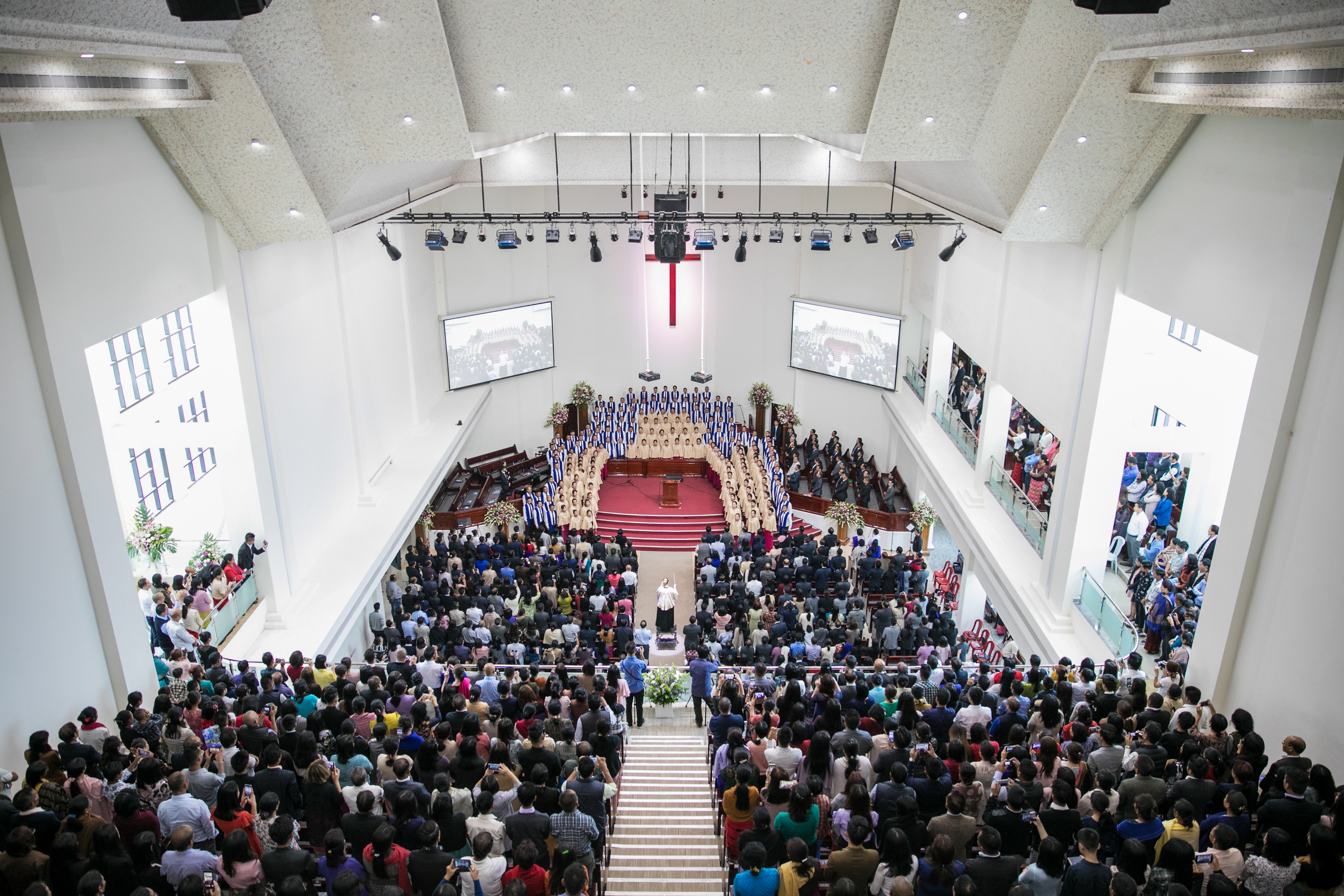
Dedication service at the Kohima Ao Baptist Church in Kohima, affiliated to the Nagaland Baptist Church Council, 2019.

In evangelical Baptist churches, the dedication of a church building usually takes place during a service. In Pentecostal churches, a dedication plaque is also attached to the building.

== See also ==
- Cornerstone
- Deconsecration
- Ex-voto

== Citations and references ==
Citations

References

- This article incorporates text from a publication now in the public domain: Warren, Frederick (1911). "Dedication". In Chisholm, Hugh (ed.). Encyclopædia Britannica. Vol. 7 (11th ed.). Cambridge University Press. pp. 918–920.
