= Olaus Laurentii =

Archbishop of Uppsala from 1432 to 1438

Olof Larsson
- Archbishop of Uppsala; Primate of Sweden
- Church: Roman Catholic
- Archdiocese: Uppsala
- Appointed: 1432
- In office: 1432–1438
- Predecessor: Johan Håkansson
- Successor: Nicolaus Ragvaldi

Orders
- Rank: Metropolitan Archbishop

Personal details
- Born: Sweden
- Died: 25 June 1438 Nyköping, Sweden

Olaus Laurentii (died 25 June 1438) was a Swedish ecclesiastic who served as the archbishop of Uppsala from 1432 to 1438.

== Biography ==
Olaus Laurentii (who is known under the Latin form of his Swedish name Olof Larsson) came from Uppland and studied at the universities of Prague, Leipzig and Paris. He was elected Dean of Uppsala Cathedral in 1417 and archbishop in 1432. He was ordained in Rome 18 May 1432.

In the conflict between king Eric of Pomerania, the ruler of the Kalmar Union countries, and the archbishop Johannes Gerechini in 1419, Olaus acted on behalf of the king and as a diplomatic envoy to Rome in the negotiations to get Johannes Gerechini deposed and the Vadstena monk Johannes Haquini elected and ordained (1422) as new archbishop. When he died in 1432, the chapter elected Olaus new archbishop. Olaus had spent long periods in the previous years in Rome and was in good standing with the pope, but the king preferred bishop Arnold of Bergen. After Arnold died, he was replaced by Torlav of Bergen. Olaus had been ordained by the pope already in 1432, but was accepted by the king only in 1435, during the rebellion of Engelbrekt Engelbrektsson. In 1436, Olaus and the Privy Council of Sweden, over which he presided, turned their back on the king and joined the rebellion.

Olaus Laurentii is said to have died from poisoning by almond milk, and according to a later source the regent (later king) Karl Knutsson (Bonde) was responsible.

In 1435, Olaus consecrated the new Uppsala Cathedral which had been under construction for two centuries.

== See also ==
- List of archbishops of Uppsala
