= Diocese of Sigtuna =

Former Catholic diocese in Sweden

Diocese of Sigtuna Diocesis Sietonensis Sigtuna stift
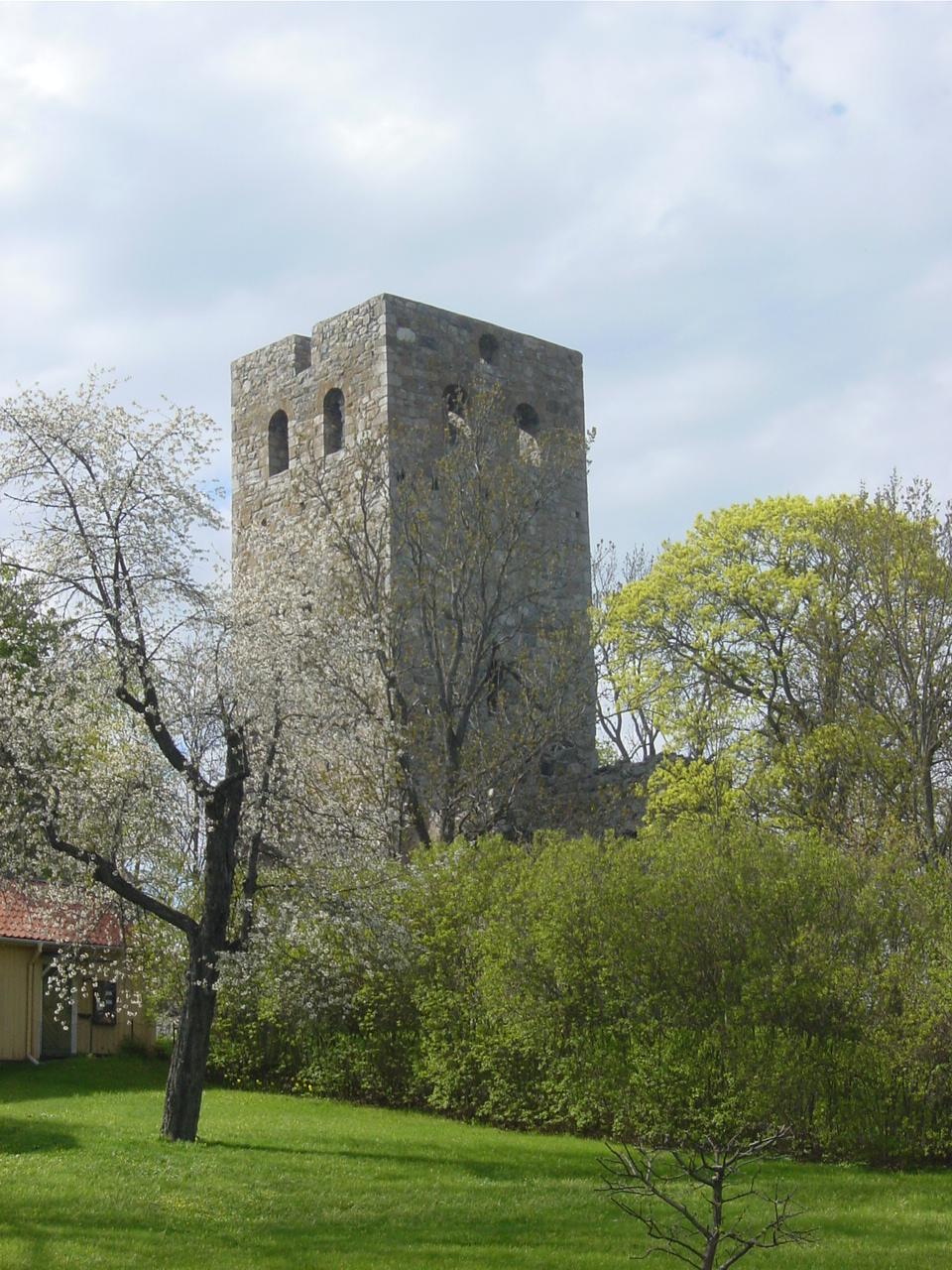
- Ruins of the Church of Saint Peter in Sigtuna

Location
- Country: Sweden
- Headquarters: Sigtuna, Uppland

Information
- Denomination: Catholic Church
- Rite: Roman Rite
- Established: c. 1060s
- Dissolved: 13th century

The Diocese of Sigtuna was a Catholic diocese founded in Sigtuna, Sweden, established in the mid 11th century. At the time, the town of Sigtuna, situated to the north of lake Mälaren and to the south of Uppsala in the Swedish province of Uppland, had been the centre of royal power for some decades, and existed until the middle of the 12th century. It was eventually out-competed by the earlier pagan religious centre Gamla Uppsala (Old Uppsala), which was raised to the status of archbishopric in 1164 (see: Archdiocese of Uppsala). King Stenkil (about 1030–1066) is said to have been the driving force behind its establishment. First bishop is said to have been Adalvard the Younger (died before 1072).

Five Sigtuna bishops are known from written sources, four diocesan bishops, but it seems that apart from Adalvard most were not stationed in Sigtuna and episcopal Sigtuna was mostly unoccupied. Approximately in 1120, the Diocese of Sigtuna was indicated but not of that of Uppsala. Uppsala diocese was formed, however, in the 1130s while Sigtuna ceased to have its own bishop. The Diocese of Sigtuna formally ceased at latest when the Diocese of Uppsala was elevated to archbishopric in 1164.

== History ==
In the middle of town Sigtuna there was a royal estate on which the first stone church in the area around lake Mälaren was built in the end of the 11th century. The bishopric of Sigtuna was established with Adalvard the Younger around 1060, as the first one in Svealand. The above-mentioned stone church was the bishop's church, the cathedral. It was demolished during the high Middle Ages, but the remains of the walls are preserved below ground. The plot is now occupied by the Sigtuna Museum. The contemporary significance of the town was testified by Adam of Bremen, who in circa 1070 refers to Sigtuna as a "civitas magna".

During the early Middle Ages no less than six or seven stone churches were erected with surrounding cemeteries. All but the cathedral was laid along a newly built street outside the old settlement area. Of these churches, only remnants of the churches of Saint Peter, Saint Lawrence and Saint Olaf remain left as ruins. Of the other ones, nothing appears above ground.

King Gustav I of Sweden allowed to use the stones from the ruins for the construction of Svartsjö Palace. In contrast, King John III of Sweden later commanded the ruins to be preserved.

== Gallery ==
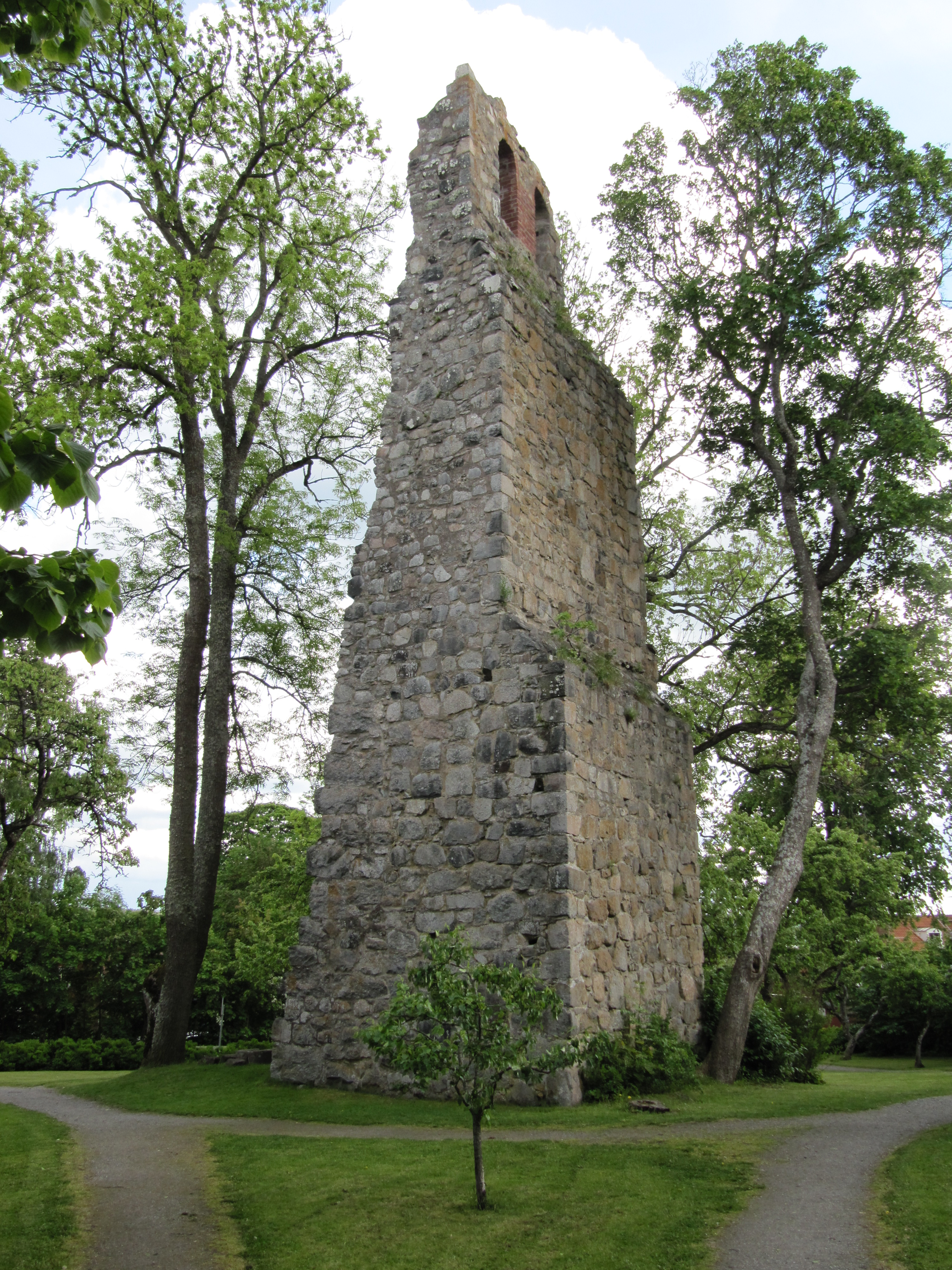
The ruins of the Church of Saint Lawrence in Sigtuna, located along Prästgatan. Few remnants remain. The church was constructed in connection with the Christianization of Sweden in the 12th century.

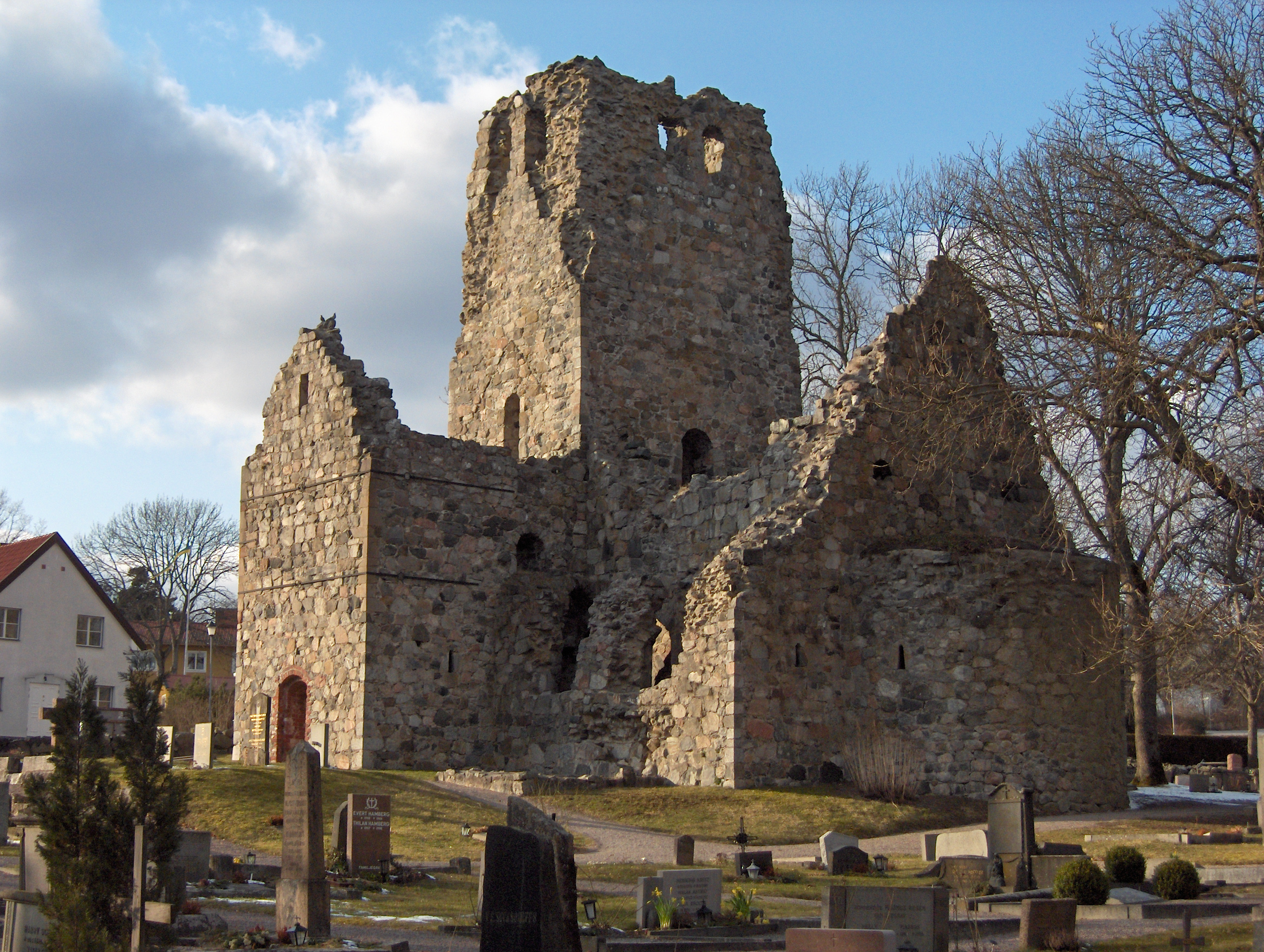
The ruins of the Church of Saint Olaf are relatively well preserved. The church has been linked to the cult of the Norwegian saint King Olaf II of Norway, who traveled through Sigtuna several times in the early 11th century.

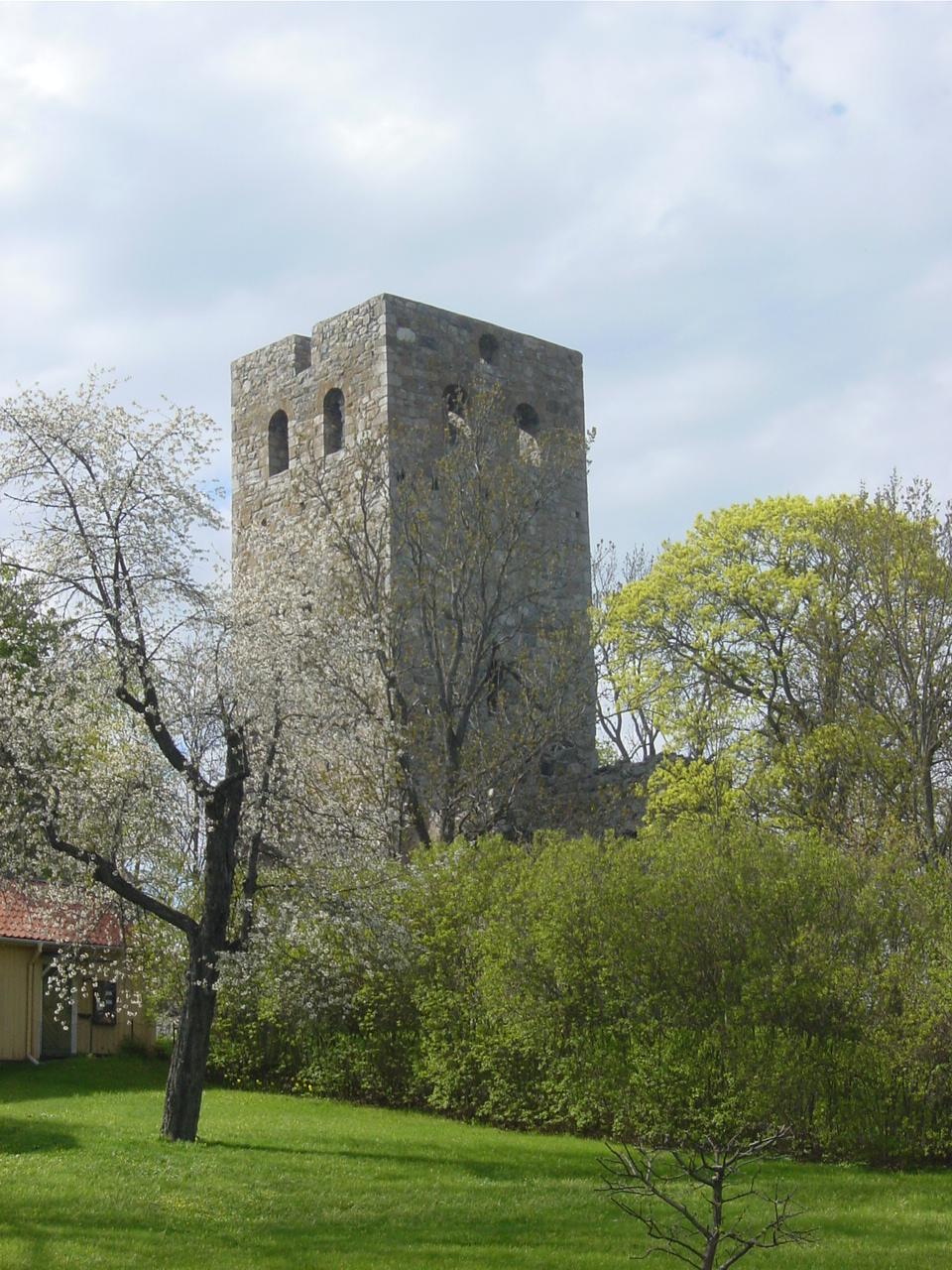
The ruins of the Church of Saint Peter are located to the west of the medieval city center. The church is considered to have served as the cathedral of the diocese before moving to Old Uppsala in 1190.

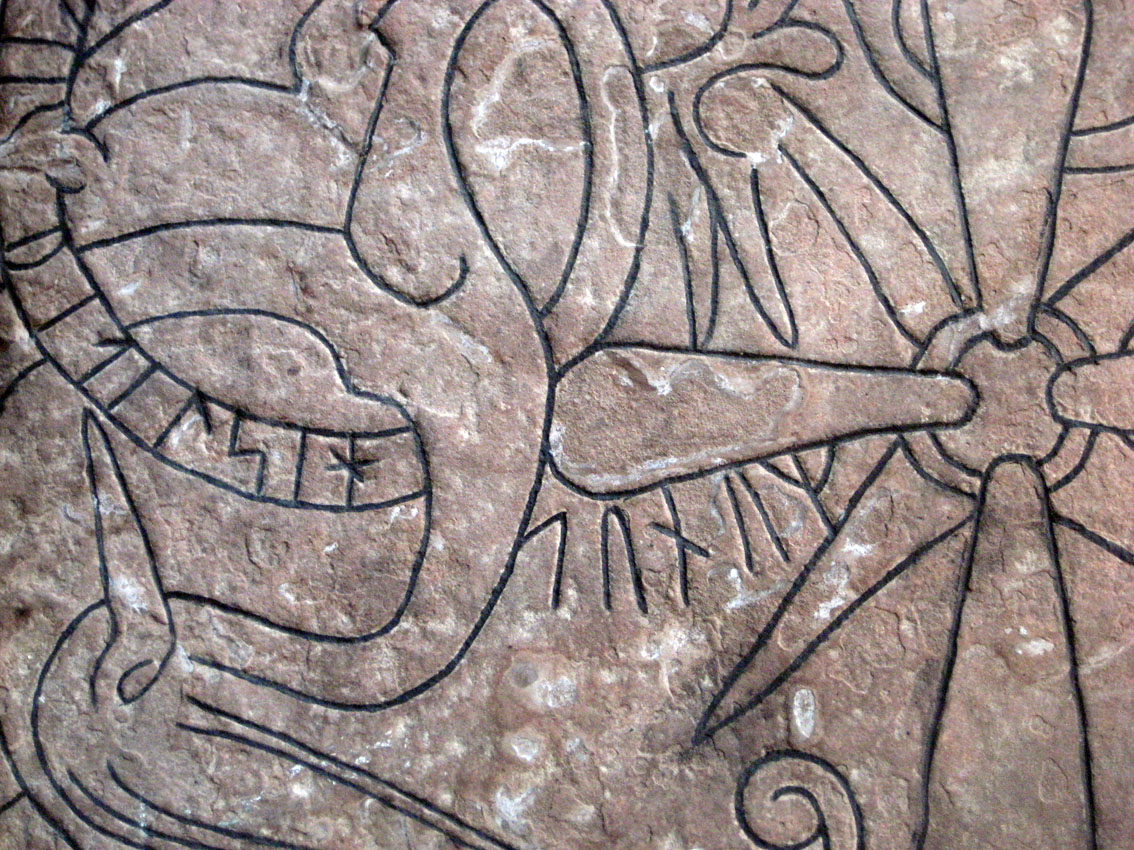
Sigtuna mentioned on rune stone now exhibited in Sigtuna Museum. Dated to approximately 1100.

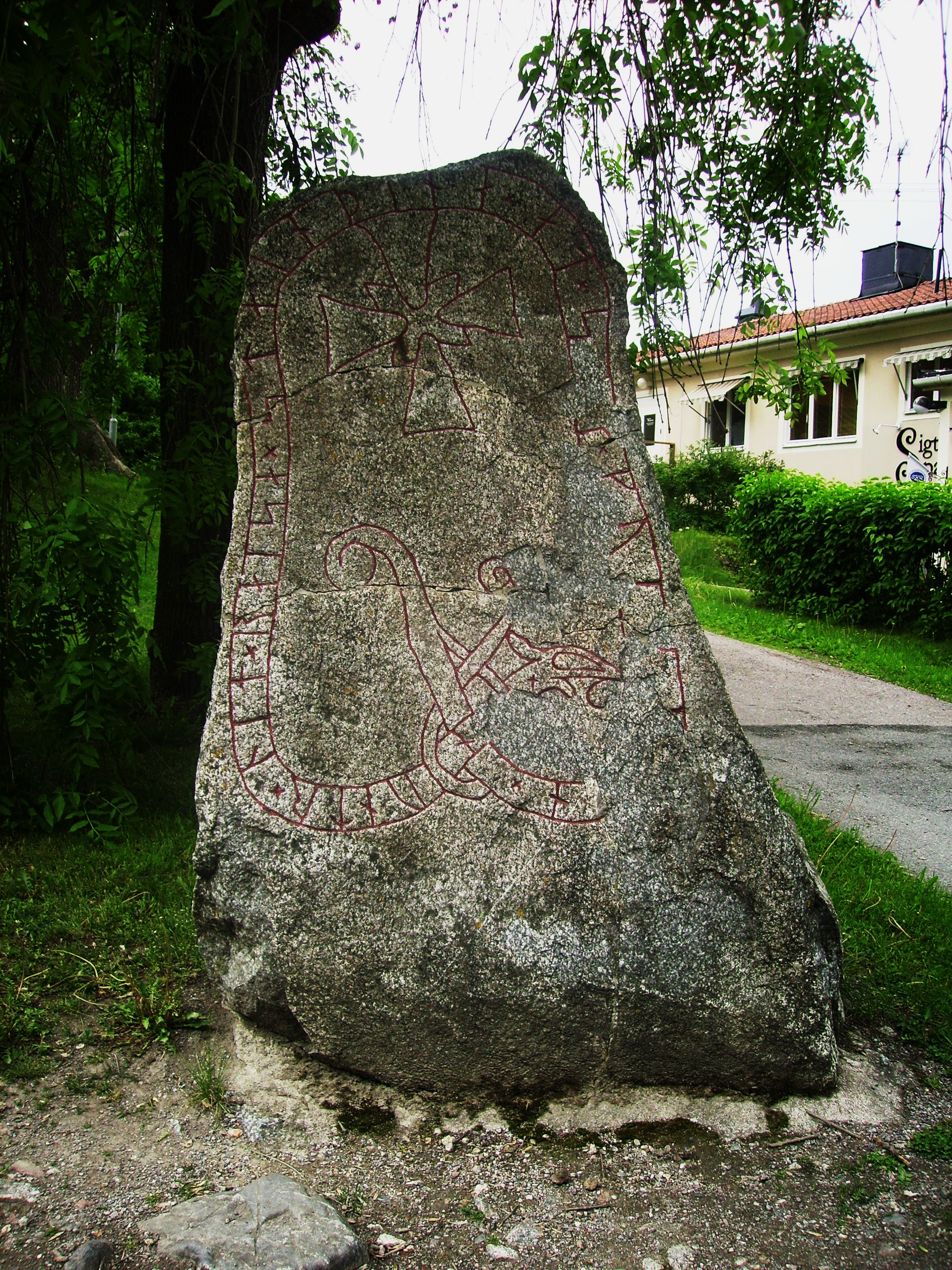
Rune stone previously located in the foundation of the north wall of the ruins of the monastery of Saint Lawrence

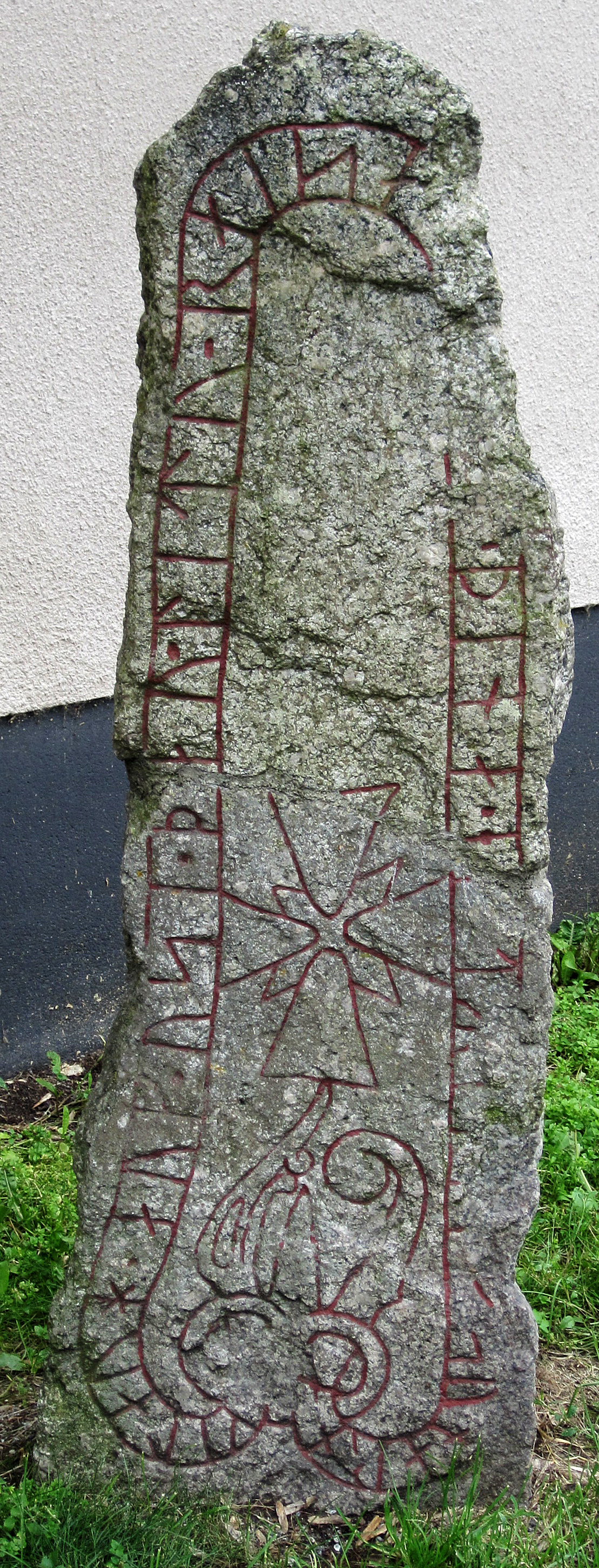
Rune stone now located along Storgatan street in Sigtuna. The runestone was found immured in a cellar close the ruins of the Church of Saint Lawrence.

== See also ==
- St. Mary's Church, Sigtuna
