= Arnold of Bergen =

Norwegian 15th-century bishop

Arnold of Bergen (Norwegian: Arend; died 1434) was the bishop of Bergen in Norway, and a non-ordained, short-lived archbishop of Uppsala in Sweden.

== Career ==
In 1432, Olaus Laurentii was elected by the Chapter to become Archbishop of Uppsala and Sweden. Following the election, the King Erik of Pomerania expressed his displeasure that he had not been consulted. In response, he decided in 1433 while Olaus Laurentii was in Rome to be ordained that Arnold of Bergen should become Archbishop. Arnold moved into the bishop's palace in Uppsala causing a dispute between the two men.

The dispute ended with Arnold's death in 1434. Following Arnold's death, the king accepted Olaus Laurentii as Archbishop.

== See also ==
- List of archbishops of Uppsala
