= Margrét Vigfúsdóttir =

15th-century Icelandic noblewoman

- Born: c. 1406
- Died: 1486
- Spouse: Þorvarður Loftsson
- Children: Ingibjörg Þorvarðsdóttir, Guðríður Þorvarðsdóttir, Ragnhildur Þorvarðsdóttir
- Parent(s): Vigfús Ívarsson, Guðríðar Ingimundardóttur
- Relatives: Ívar Vigfússon hólmur (brother)

Margrét Vigfúsdóttir (c. 1406–1486) was an Icelandic noblewoman during the 15th century and a housewife in Möðruvellir in Eyjafjörður. After her husband died, she lived both in Möðruvellir and in Hólar in Eyjafjörður for 40 years as a widow.

Margrét was the daughter of the seneschal Vigfús Ívarsson (died 1420) and Guðríður Ingimundardóttir (c. 1374 until sometime after 1436) who was from a wealthy Norse dynasty. Margrét's brother Ívar Vigfússon hólmur lived in Kirkjuból in Miðnes around 1430, and Margrét lived with him. Allegedly, the butler Magnús, master of the Bishop of Skálholt Jöns Gerekesson's boys, had proposed to Margrét but she rejected him. As his revenge, the boys attacked the farm in Kirkjuból, lit it on fire, and killed Ívar as well as all of his household. Margrét narrowly made it out, fleeing to the north of the country and vowing to marry whoever avenged her brother.

Whether or not she truly vowed to marry whoever avenged her brother, it is certain that Margrét married Þorvarður Loftsson of Möðruvellir who had grievances with Jöns Gerekesson and was one of those who led the attack to kill him in the summer of 1433. However, their marriage did not take place until three years later and the connection between the marriage and the bishop's death is uncertain. Þorvarður was the son of Loftur Guttormsson and was very wealthy. Margrét was also very well-off, so together they were considered the richest couple in Iceland in their day.

Þorvarður died in 1446 after just 10 years of marriage, but Margrét lived on, first in Möðruvellir and later in Hólar. They had three daughters:

- Ingibjörg, wife of Páll Brandsson, sýslumaður of Möðruvellir, but they and their sons all died during the second outbreak of the plague in 1494
- Guðríður, wife of Erlendur Erlendsson, sýslumaður of Hlíðarendi, and mother of the seneschal Vigfús Erlendsson
- Ragnhildur who married Hákarli-Bjarni Marteinsson of Ketilsstaðir in Vellir and later of Eiðar.

All of the daughters were married at the same time in Möðruvellir in 1465 where they held a lavish party.

Sources from old letters strongly indicate that Margrét was a woman of distinction who enjoyed great respect from her contemporaries. She managed her own finances as well as her daughters' after their husbands died and likely even increased their wealth. She owned a lot of property in Iceland as well as Norway, which she inherited from her mother.
