= Johan Håkansson =

Archbishop of Uppsala from 1421 to 1432

- Archbishop of Uppsala; Primate of Sweden
- Church: Roman Catholic
- Archdiocese: Uppsala
- Appointed: 1421
- In office: 1421–1432
- Predecessor: Jöns Gerekesson
- Successor: Olaus Laurentii

Orders
- Consecration: 28 June 1421
- Rank: Metropolitan Archbishop

Personal details
- Born: Sweden
- Died: 9 February 1432

Johan Håkansson (also latinized as Johannes Haquini; died 1432) was the archbishop of Uppsala in Sweden from 1421 to 1432.

== Biography ==
His first known occupations were at a school in Söderköping and as a canon in Linköping. In 1411 he enrolled at Vadstena monastery. In 1418 he was sent on an important assignment to Rome, from where he returned in 1420.

In 1421 the previous Archbishop of Uppsala, Jöns Gerekesson resigned. Three new candidates were presented to the Swedish King Erik of Pomerania, of whom he chose Johan Håkansson.

Haquini's history as a monk set the standards for his time as archbishop. He allowed the clerics to be freed from taxes, and he built a permanent house for the archbishop (demolished during Gustav Vasa's liberation war in 1522).

== See also ==
- List of archbishops of Uppsala
