= Believer's baptism =

Christian baptism of professing followers

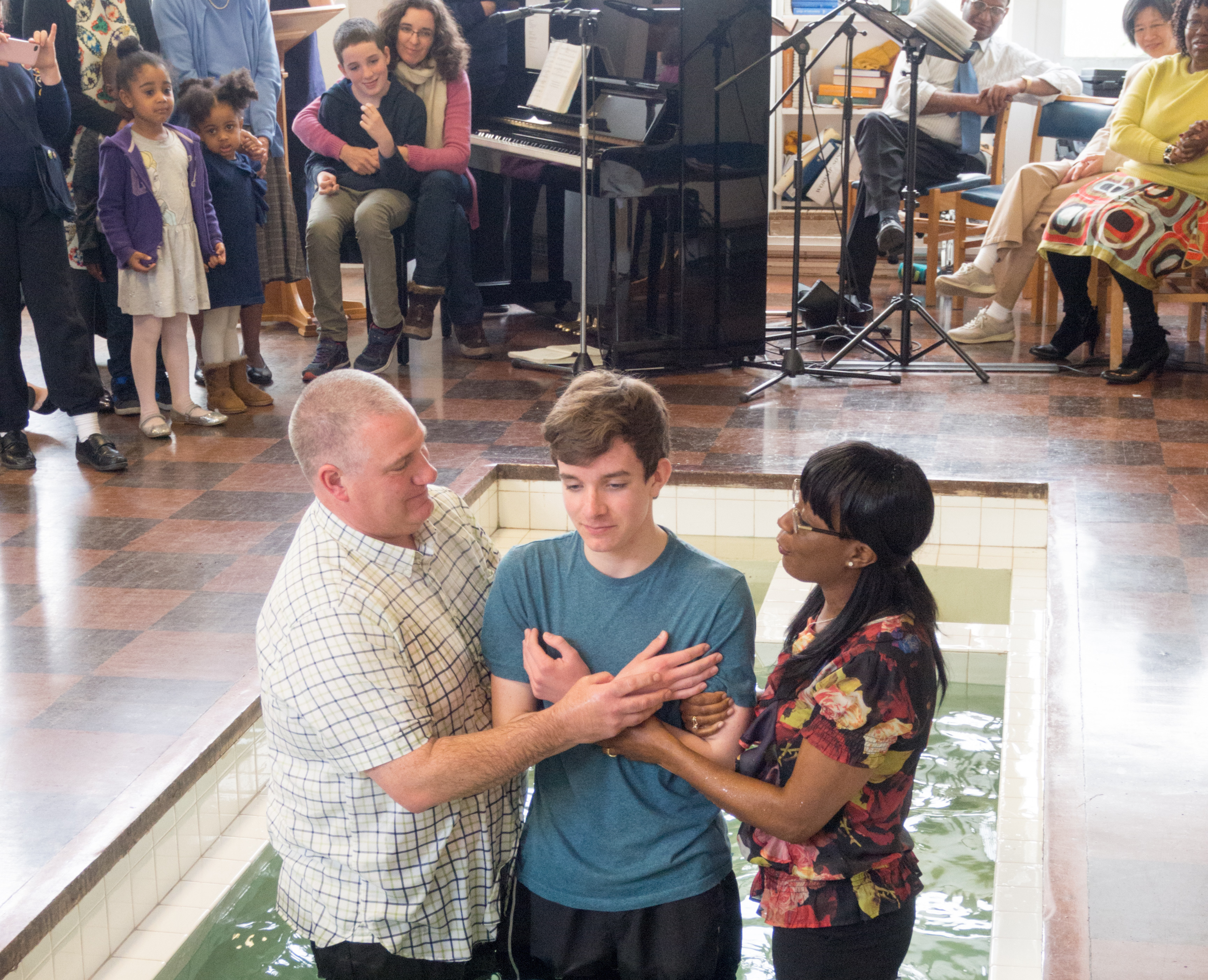
Believer's baptism done by the mode of immersion, Northolt Park Baptist Church, in Greater London, Baptist Union of Great Britain, 2015, arms crossed over chest, with man and woman at either side

Believer's baptism, also called credobaptism (from the Latin word credo, meaning "I believe"), is the practice of baptizing those who are able to make a conscious profession of faith, as contrasted to the practice of baptizing infants. Credobaptists believe that infants incapable of consciously believing should not be baptized.

The mode of believer's baptism depends on the Christian denomination, and is done either by pouring (the normative method in Mennonite, Amish, and Hutterite churches) or by immersion (the normative method practiced by Schwarzenau Brethren, River Brethren, Baptists, and the Pentecostals, among others). Among those denominations that practice immersion, the way that it is practiced depends on the Church; the Schwarzenau Brethren and the River Brethren for example teach "trine immersion, that is, dipping three times forward in the name of the Father, the Son, and the Holy Spirit."

Certain denominations of Methodism, including the Free Methodist Church and Evangelical Wesleyan Church, practice infant baptism for families who desire it for their children, but provide a rite for child dedication for those who have a preference for believer's baptism only after their child has made a personal acceptance of Jesus as their savior.

Denominations and groups who practice believer's baptism were historically referred to as "Anabaptist" (from Neo-Latin anabaptista, from the Greek ἀναβαπτισμός: ἀνά-, "re-", and βαπτισμός, "baptism"), though this term is used primarily to categorize the denominations and adherents belonging to the Anabaptist branch of Christianity that emerged in the era of the Radical Reformation.

== History ==
The Anabaptists regard their ideas as being based on the teaching of Jesus Christ, who, according to the Gospel of Matthew chapter 28, invited to make disciples in all nations and to baptize them in the name of the Father, of the Son and of the Holy Spirit. According to some theologians, it is natural to follow the order thus suggested, either to baptize someone who has become a disciple before, which is not possible with a baby or a child. They contend that in the New Testament, references to the baptized relate only to believers who have experienced a new birth.

=== Patristics ===
==== Apostolic Fathers ====
The Didache has been a matter of discussion among Protestants on what it teaches about baptism. The Didache has been argued to have assumed believer's baptism, as it assumes discipleship before baptism and does not mention infant baptism. Against this, Philip Schaff argued that the silence of the Didache about infant baptism "cannot be fairly used as an argument against it".

Similar to Tertullian later, the Shepherd of Hermas implies for the practice of delaying baptism for the practical reason of the fear of post-baptismal sins, as Hermas says those who fall have only one chance of penance.

Polycarp stated, "I have served him eighty-six years and in no way has he dealt unjustly with me". Proponents of infant baptism argue that this quote shows Polycarp being baptized as an infant, the argument being that if Polycarp was a servant of Christ for 86 years, he would have been a servant of Christ from infancy, suggesting infant baptism. However, against the argument, Schoedel William argued that the quote is ambiguous as regards baptism, and that Polycarp meant by paraphrasing: "I have always served Jesus and I am not going to cease even at the age of 86."

==== Ante-Nicene Christianity ====
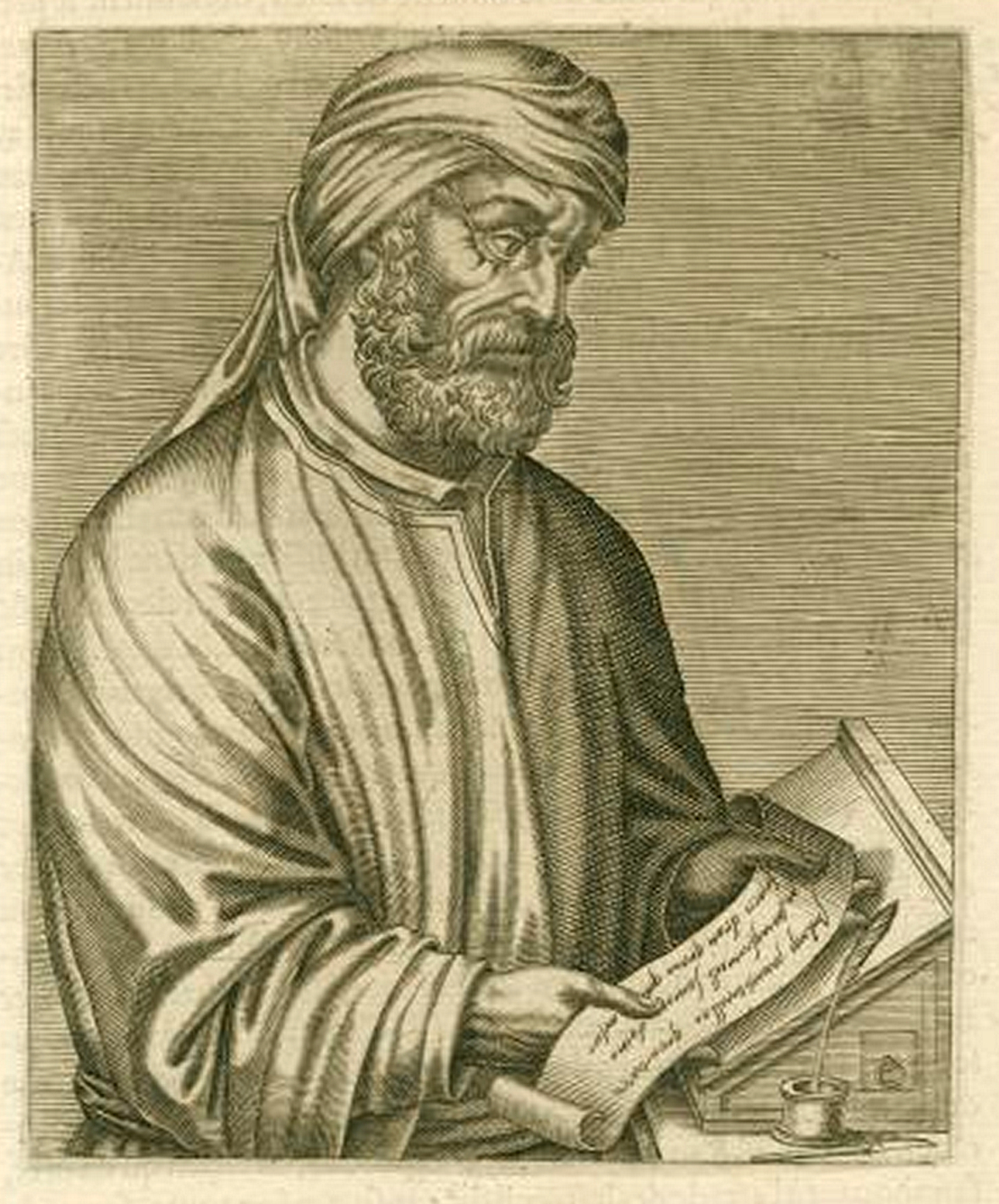
Tertullian advised the postponement of baptism in the case of little children.

Infant baptism in this time was affirmed by Hippolytus of Rome and Cyprian, who announced the decision of the African synod to require the baptism of infants. The practice is also clearly practiced in the churches of Egypt very early, as seen from the writings of Origen, who claimed it as apostolic tradition. However, according to Schreiner, Origen's need to make an apology for infant baptism implies it was not a universal belief. Tertullian (c. 198–203), in his treatise on baptism, advises the postponement of baptism in the case of little children, arguing that it is better to wait until one is ready to live what he professes in baptism rather than to repudiate the profession by wickedness. He however also advises to postpone the baptism of the unmarried, and mentions that the baptism of infants existed during his time, having sponsors speaking on their behalf.

Philip Schaff among many others have argued that Justin Martyr affirmed infant baptism, Justin stating that some in his day have been disciples of Jesus since childhood, while Dan Taylor instead claimed that Justin Martyr is "clear and full evidence" that infant baptism was not practiced during his time. He highlighted Justin's statements that one was "persuaded that the things spoken and taught by us are true", before baptism. Dan Taylor argued against the interpretation of the quote used to justify infant baptism, stating that by "discipleship", Justin was not referring to baptism but to teaching.

Thomas Schreiner argued that the Apology of Aristedes indirectly excludes infant baptism, stating that the children of believers were considered part of the Christian community only after conversion.

Clement of Alexandria made no clear statements on infant baptism. Proponents of believer's baptism have argued that because Clement of Alexandria connects repentance and baptism, he supported the practice. On the other hand Philip Schaff wrote that some statements that he makes can unclearly imply infant baptism.

Eusebius mentioned that an earlier presbyter who took a child and "committed to him, reared, kept, cherished, and finally baptized him".

In inscriptions from the end from the second century and later in which the date of baptism and death are mentioned, there is a close correlation between the time of baptism and their time of death. For example, Antonia Cyriaceti died and received baptism on the same day, Felite received baptism March 26 and died April 29. Multiple other inscriptions mention people of varying ages, who died as "neophytes" which implies someone whose baptism was a recent event, such as a Greek inscription that mentioned Achillia, who died in their 5th year as a neophyte.

The policy of the Montanists discouraged baptism of infants. Additionally, some have argued that the schismatic Novatians did not generally baptize infants, though the stance of the Novatians is disputed and by this point infant baptism had become clear among many orthodox writers.

==== Post-Nicene Christianity ====
Thomas Schreiner pointed out that many of the Cappadocian Fathers were not baptized until adulthood, including Basil the Great, Gregory of Naziansus, and Gregory of Nyssa. Schreiner argued that Gregory of Naziansus was generally opposed to infant baptism, preferring children who were old enough to understand the "basic outlines of the faith" to be baptized, except when there was a danger of death for the infant. Schreiner also argued that Cyril of Jerusalem implies the baptized should be old enough to understand and ready to obey certain commands. Additionally, Basil of Caesarea defined baptism as an expression of faith, stating: "baptism is established by faith, and each is carried out by the same names. For as we believe in the Father, Son and Holy Spirit, so also we are baptized in the name of the Father, Son and Holy Spirit. The confession that brings salvation comes first and there follows baptism which seals our assent."

Jerome, Rufinus of Aquileia, Ambrose and John Chrysostom received baptism at a later age. Monica did not baptize Augustine as a child because of the fear of post-baptismal sins, the situation of Basil and Augustine are however different, there are no indications that St. Emmelia, who was the mother of Basil, feared post-baptismal sins like Monica did for Augustine.

Augustine argued that the custom infant baptism has been handed down from Jesus and the apostles to the church. During the Pelagian controversy, both Caelestius and Augustine affirmed the validity of infant baptism, but the Pelagians denied that infants have sin in them.

The practice of infant baptism was additionally affirmed by the Council of Carthage in 418, stating that infant baptism cleanses original sin. John Chrysostom and Prosper of Aquitane likewise affirmed infant baptism.

=== Medieval ===
Walafrid Strabo, despite being in support of infant baptism, said that baptism "in the ancient times" was performed on those who had already matured.

During the medieval age, infant baptism was opposed by the Arnoldists, Waldensians, and Peter of Bruys. Some Waldensians also practiced baptism by full immersion. Reinerius mentioned that the Waldensians believed that the "ablution which is given to infants profits nothing".

The Paulicians strongly opposed infant baptism; they only gave baptism to adults after instruction, confession, and repentance. The Bogomils and Cathars also rejected the baptism of infants. However, they did not believe anyone should be baptized in water at all, and instead believed baptism to be of a spiritual character.

Though infant baptism was practiced in the Bohemian reformation, a few also practiced believer's baptism. This includes Petr Chelčický who preferred to baptize those of older age, however without proposing re-baptism and the radical Taborite Pierre Kanis, who believed baptism should be withheld until the age of 30.

Sebastian Frank wrote that "The Picards in Bohemia are divided into two, or some say three parties, the large, the small, the very small, who hold in all things with the Anabaptists".

=== Protestant Reformation ===
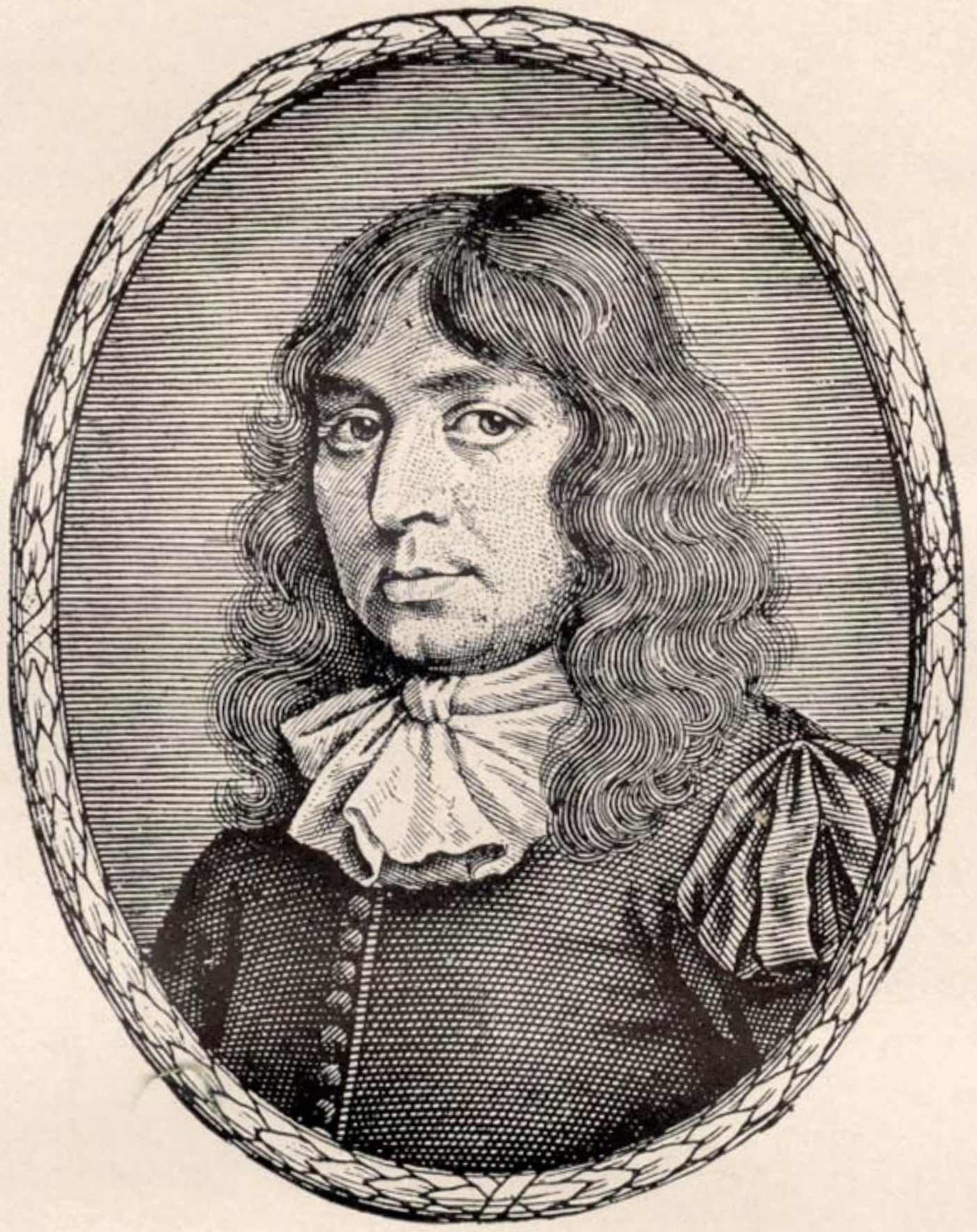
John Smyth started the Baptist movement.

In the early church, instances of baptisms following conversion to Christianity are recorded. Advocates of believers' baptism argue that this implies infants would not be baptized since they could not profess faith for themselves. Beginning with Augustine, the church solidified the practice of infant baptism and there is little mention of competing practices until the 1500s. Augustine held the view that baptism was a requirement for the washing away of sins. He was faced with the issue of whether an unconscious or unwilling individual on their deathbed should be baptized; he felt it was better to err on the side of caution and baptize such a person.

Michael Servetus and the Zwickau prophets opposed infant baptism. Additionally, Andreas Karlstad opposed infant baptism but did not demand rebaptism of once baptized infants.

In the early 16th century, the Anabaptist movement began demanding that baptismal candidates be able to make a freely chosen profession of faith, thus rejecting the baptism of infants. This, and other doctrinal differences, led both Catholics and Protestants to persecute the Anabaptists, executing them by fire, sword, or drowning. Major Anabaptist theologians included: Balthasar Hubmaier, Jakob Hutter, Melchior Hofmann, John of Leiden and Menno Simons. Ulrich Zwingli once met Balthasar Hubmaier and agreed that infant baptism should be discontinued, however Zwingli would later become a persecutor of those who denied infant baptism. However Hubmaier would allow infant baptism in extreme situations.

Historians trace the earliest "Baptist" church to 1609 in Amsterdam in the Dutch Republic, with English Separatist John Smyth as its pastor. In 1641, the Baptist movements began adopting baptism by immersion. Some of them may have insisted on credobaptism by affusion a few decades earlier.

Advocates of believer's baptism contend that non-Biblical records are not authoritative, and that no evidence exists from the Bible or early Christian literature that infant baptism was practiced by the apostles.

== Arguments for credobaptism ==
=== Scripture ===
Advocates of believer's baptism argue that the New Testament does not describe instances of infant baptism, and that during the New Testament era, the early church required converts to have conscious, deliberate faith in Jesus Christ.

Advocates for believer's baptism use Acts 2 to support their view, where Peter commanded to believe before baptism took place. Credobaptists also argue that Jesus' baptism as an adult, and not as an infant, is supportive of believer's baptism.

Gavin Ortlund argues that the parallel with circumcision supports believer's baptism, arguing that since circumcision was given to the children of Abraham (Genesis 17:9) and that in the New Testament, only believers are called sons of Abraham (Galatians 3:7), thus supporting believer's baptism.

== Age of accountability ==
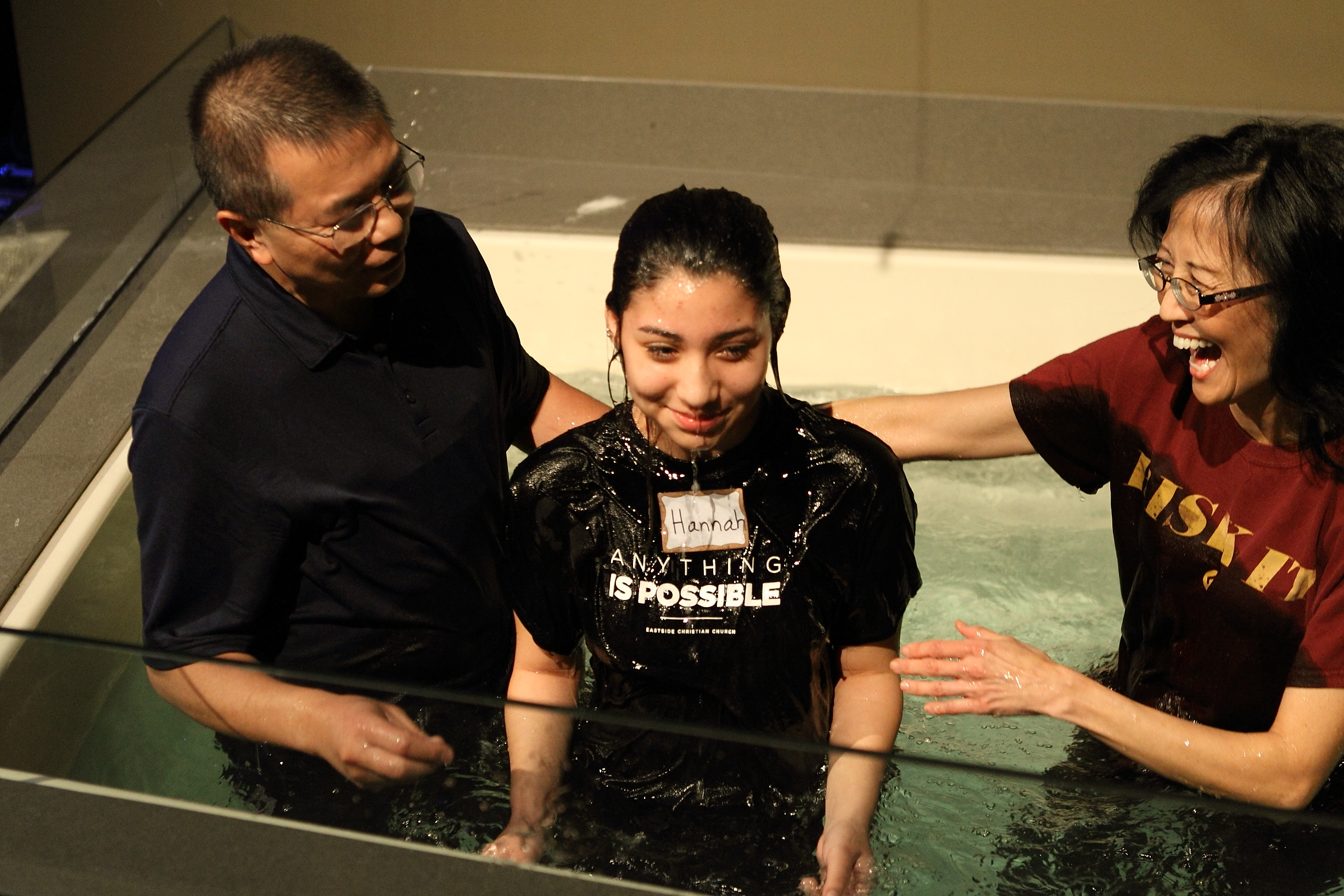
Believer's baptism by immersion at Eastside Christian Church, Anaheim, United States, 2018

Believer's baptism is administered only to persons who have passed the age of accountability or reason, which is based upon a reading of the New Testament that only believers should be baptized. The believer's full understanding is verified by leaders when a believer makes a profession of faith before baptism.

In practice, this age generally corresponds to the beginning of adolescence, around 12 years in Anabaptist churches and 9 to 12 years in Baptist churches.

This understanding of the age of responsibility is analogous to the Jewish tradition of Bar Mitzvah at the age of 12 or 13, at which point Jewish children become responsible for their actions and "one to whom the commandments apply".

In churches practicing believer's baptism, the age of accountability may have been set higher or lower depending on their traditional practices and their understanding of the psychological development of children.

== Practice ==
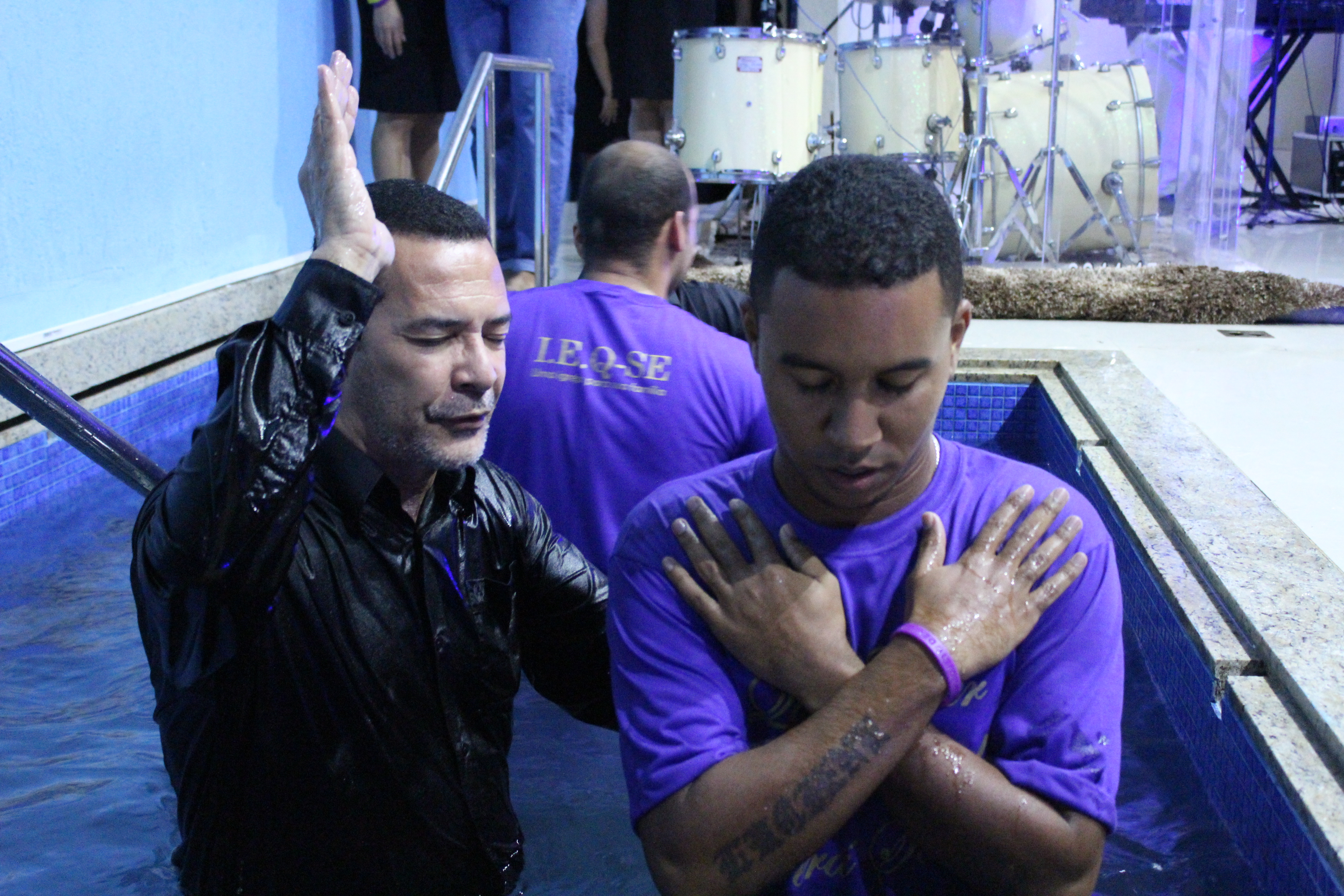
Believer's baptism of an adult by immersion at The Foursquare Church in Aracaju, Brazil, 2015

In areas where those who practice believer's baptism are the physical or cultural majority, the ritual may function as a rite of passage by which the child is granted the status of an adult.

== Denominational practices ==
Evangelical denominations adhering to the doctrine of the believers' Church practice believer's baptism, after the new birth and a profession of faith.

=== Anabaptist ===
Believer's baptism is one of several distinctive doctrines associated closely with Anabaptist (literally, rebaptizer) denominations, inclusive of Mennonites, Amish, Hutterites, Bruderhof, Schwarzenau Brethren, River Brethren, and Apostolic Christians. For Anabaptists, "believer's baptism consists of three parts, the Spirit, the water, and the blood—these three witnesses on earth." According to Anabaptist theology: (1) In believer's baptism, the Holy Spirit witnesses the candidate entering into a covenant with God. (2) God, in believer's baptism, "grants a baptized believer the water of baptism as a sign of His covenant with them—that such a one indicates and publicly confesses that he wants to live in true obedience towards God and fellow believers with a blameless life". (3) Integral to believer's baptism is the candidate's mission to witness to the world even unto martyrdom, echoing Jesus' words that "they would be baptized with His baptism, witnessing to the world when their blood was spilt". Anabaptist denominations, such as the Mennonites, Amish, and Hutterites, use pouring as the mode to administer believer's baptism, whereas Anabaptists of the Schwarzenau Brethren and River Brethren traditions baptize by immersion.

The Schwarzenau Brethren, along with the River Brethren, both of which are Anabaptist denominations, teach that the ordinance "be trine immersion, that is, dipping three times forward in the name of the Father, the Son, and the Holy Spirit." The three plunges in the forward position, for each person of the Holy Trinity, also represent the "three days of Christ's burial." Immersion baptism is done falling forward by the Schwarzenau Brethren because "the Bible says Jesus bowed his head (letting it fall forward) and died. Baptism represents a dying of the old, sinful self."

For Anabaptists, believer's baptism is a core, non-negotiable belief. Baptism of individuals perceived to be too immature to understand the significance of the act is considered to show profound, even sacrilegious disrespect for the practice of baptism.

=== Baptist, Pentecostal, and Nondenominational Christianity ===
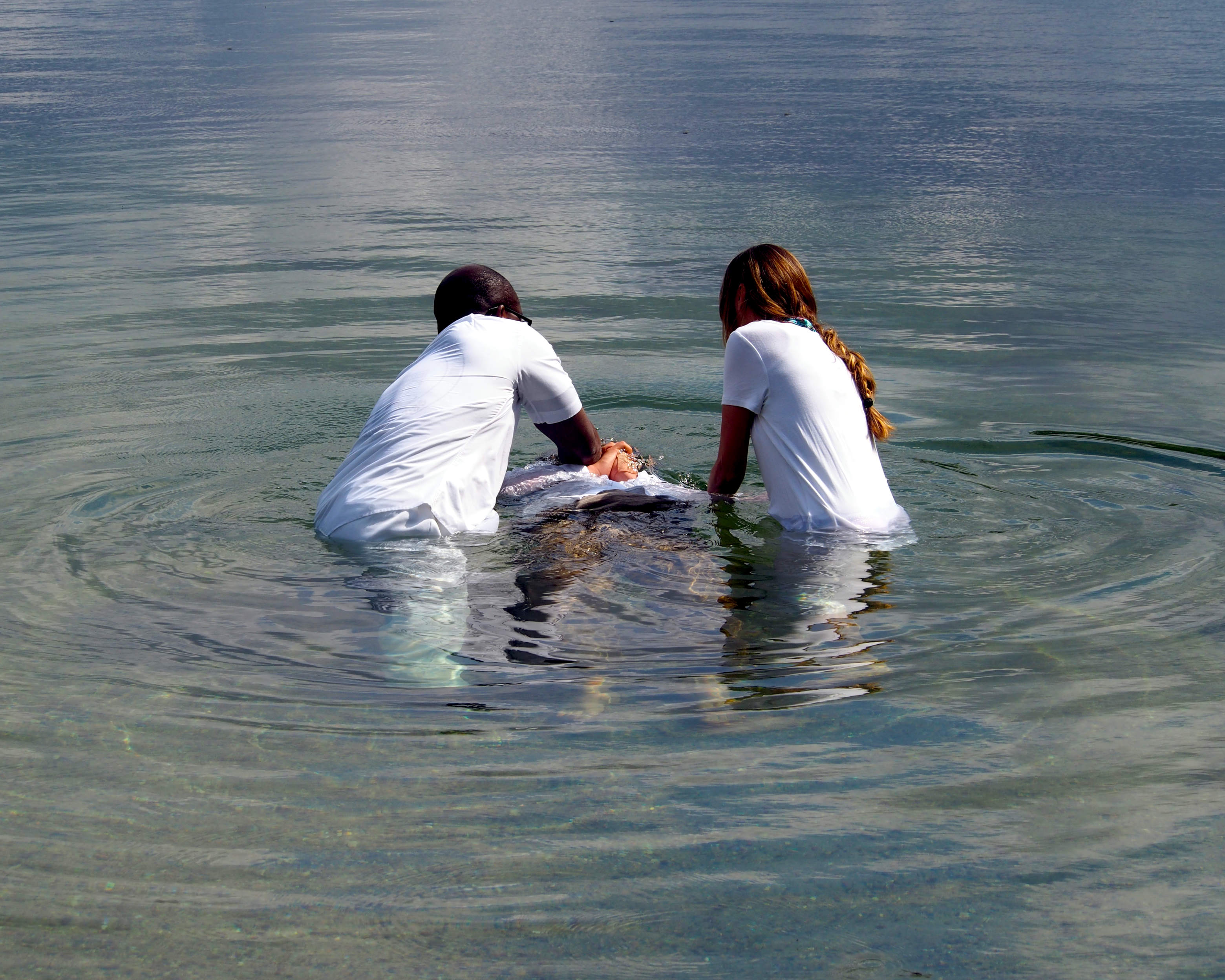
Baptism in open water in Germany

Believer's baptism is also practiced by Baptists, as well as many Pentecostals.

=== Methodism ===
Many Methodist denominations, such as the Free Methodist Church and Evangelical Wesleyan Church, practice infant baptism for families who desire it for their children, but provide a rite for child dedication for those who have a preference for believer's baptism only after their child has made a personal acceptance of Jesus as their saviour. Both infant baptism and believer's baptism may be received via pouring, sprinkling, or immersion—with the candidate or the candidate's parents or sponsors choosing the mode of administration.

=== Restorationism ===
In the Seventh-day Adventist Church, rebaptism by immersion is not required for church membership. However, it is available to those who feel that they have received new information that makes a difference or have experienced a reconversion.

The Church of Jesus Christ of Latter-day Saints completely rejects infant baptism. Little children are considered both born without sin and incapable of committing sin. They have no need of baptism until age eight, when they can begin to learn to discern right from wrong, and are thus accountable to God for their own actions. People completely incapable of understanding right from wrong, regardless of age, are also considered as not accountable for their actions, and are not baptized.

== Theological objections ==
Many churches that baptize infants, such as the Roman Catholic, Presbyterian, Reformed, Anglican, Methodist, Lutheran, Moravian, Eastern Orthodox, and Oriental Orthodox denominations, previously functioned as national, state-established churches in various European and Latin American countries. Defenders of infant baptism have attempted to trace the practice to the New Testament era, but generally acknowledge that no unambiguous evidence exists that the practice existed prior to the 2nd century. During the Reformation, the relationship of the church to the state was a contentious issue, and infant baptism was seen as a way to ensure that society remained religiously homogeneous. As a result, groups that rejected infant baptism were seen as subversive and were often persecuted.

=== Churches of Christ ===
Among the Churches of Christ, baptism is seen as a passive act of faith rather than a meritorious work; it "is a confession that a person has nothing to offer God". While the Churches of Christ do not describe baptism as a "sacrament", their view of it can be described as "sacramental". They see the power of baptism coming from God, who chose to use baptism as a vehicle, rather than from the water or the act itself, and understand baptism to be an integral part of the conversion process, rather than just a symbol of conversion. A recent trend is to emphasize the transformational aspect of baptism. Instead of describing it as just a legal requirement or sign of something that happened in the past, it is seen as "the event that places the believer 'into Christ' where God does the ongoing work of transformation". Because of the belief that baptism is a necessary part of salvation, some Baptists hold that the Churches of Christ endorse the doctrine of baptismal regeneration. However, members of the Churches of Christ reject this, arguing that since faith and repentance are necessary, and that the cleansing of sins is by the blood of Christ through the grace of God, baptism is not an inherently redeeming ritual. One author from the Churches of Christ describes the relationship between faith and baptism: "Faith is the reason why a person is a child of God; baptism is the time at which one is incorporated into Christ and so becomes a child of God" (italics in the source). Baptism is understood as a confessional expression of faith and repentance, rather than a "work" that earns salvation.

== See also ==
- Baptism in Mormonism
- Confirmation
- Infant baptism
- Mikveh

== Bibliography ==
- Bryant, Rees (1999), Baptism, Why Wait?: Faith's Response in Conversion, College Press, ISBN 978-0-89900-858-5, 224 pp.
- Ferguson, Everett (1996), The Church of Christ: A Biblical Ecclesiology for Today, William B Eerdmans, ISBN 978-0-8028-4189-6, 443 pp.
- Foster, Douglas A (2001), "Churches of Christ and Baptism: An Historical and Theological Overview", Restoration Quarterly, vol. 43, no. 2, Abilene Christian University, archived from the original on 2010-05-20.
- Foster, Douglas Allen; Dunnavant, Anthony L; Blowers; Williams (2004), The Encyclopedia of the Stone-Campbell Movement: Christian Church (Disciples of Christ), Christian Churches/Churches of Christ, Churches of Christ, William B Eerdmans, ISBN 978-0-8028-3898-8, 854 pp.
- Hazelip, Harold; Holloway, Gary; Harris, Randall J; Black, Mark C (1998), Theology Matters: In Honor of Harold Hazelip: Answers for the Church Today, College Press, ISBN 978-0-89900-813-4, 368 pp.
- Ludlow, Daniel H, ed. (1992). Encyclopedia of Mormonism. New York: Macmillan Publishing. ISBN 0-02-879602-0. OCLC 24502140.
- Malone, Fred (2003) The baptism of disciples alone: A covenantal argument for credobaptism versus paedobaptism. Founders Press, ISBN 0-9713361-3-X.
- Nettles, Tom J; Pratt, Richard L Jr; Armstrong, John H; Kolb, Robert (2007), Understanding Four Views on Baptism, Zondervan, ISBN 978-0-310-26267-1, 222 pp.
- Quinter, James (1886), A Vindication of Trine Immersion as the Apostolic Form of Christian Baptism, The Brethren's Publishing Company
- Stander, Hendick F; Louw, Johannes P (2004), Baptism in the Early Church, Carey, ISBN 0-9527913-1-5.
- Schreiner, Thomas R and Wright, Shawn (ed.), Believer's Baptism: The Covenant Sign of the New Age in Christ, B&H (2007), ISBN 0-8054-3249-3
