= Child dedication =

Act of consecration of children

A child dedication, also called child consecration, child presentation, infant dedication, and infant consecration, is a Christian ceremony among credobaptist churches, performed usually by a pastor, which consists of publicly blessing children of believers, especially newborns.

It is also distinctly practiced by the Woman's Christian Temperance Union, in which parents promise to help their child live a life free from alcohol and other drugs.

== Christianity ==
=== Origin ===
The child's presentation has its origin in the Book of Exodus in chapter 13 verse 2; "Consecrate to me every firstborn male. The first offspring of every womb among the Israelites belongs to me, whether human or animal". The Bible relates some presentations of children. That of Samuel, in the Old Testament by Hannah. And especially the presentation of Jesus in the Temple in the New Testament by Joseph and Mary. Likewise, Jesus blessed children. This biblical practice was done only for the first born sons and often they are left at the Temple to serve God. The dedication of the first born was a practice different from circumcision, which was a covenant sign for the community of God.

=== History ===
In 1523, the Anabaptist movement, which taught that baptism is only for adults (believer's baptism) according to their understanding of the Bible, first instituted child dedication practice for all children from believing households instead of just the first born sons. The child dedication was subsequently adopted by many denominations adhering to the doctrine of the Believers' Church. Other Evangelical denominations, such as many Methodist Churches, contain rites for both infant baptism and child dedication, leaving the option to families for what they wish for their sons and daughters; examples include the Free Methodist Church and Allegheny Wesleyan Methodist Connection.

=== Form ===
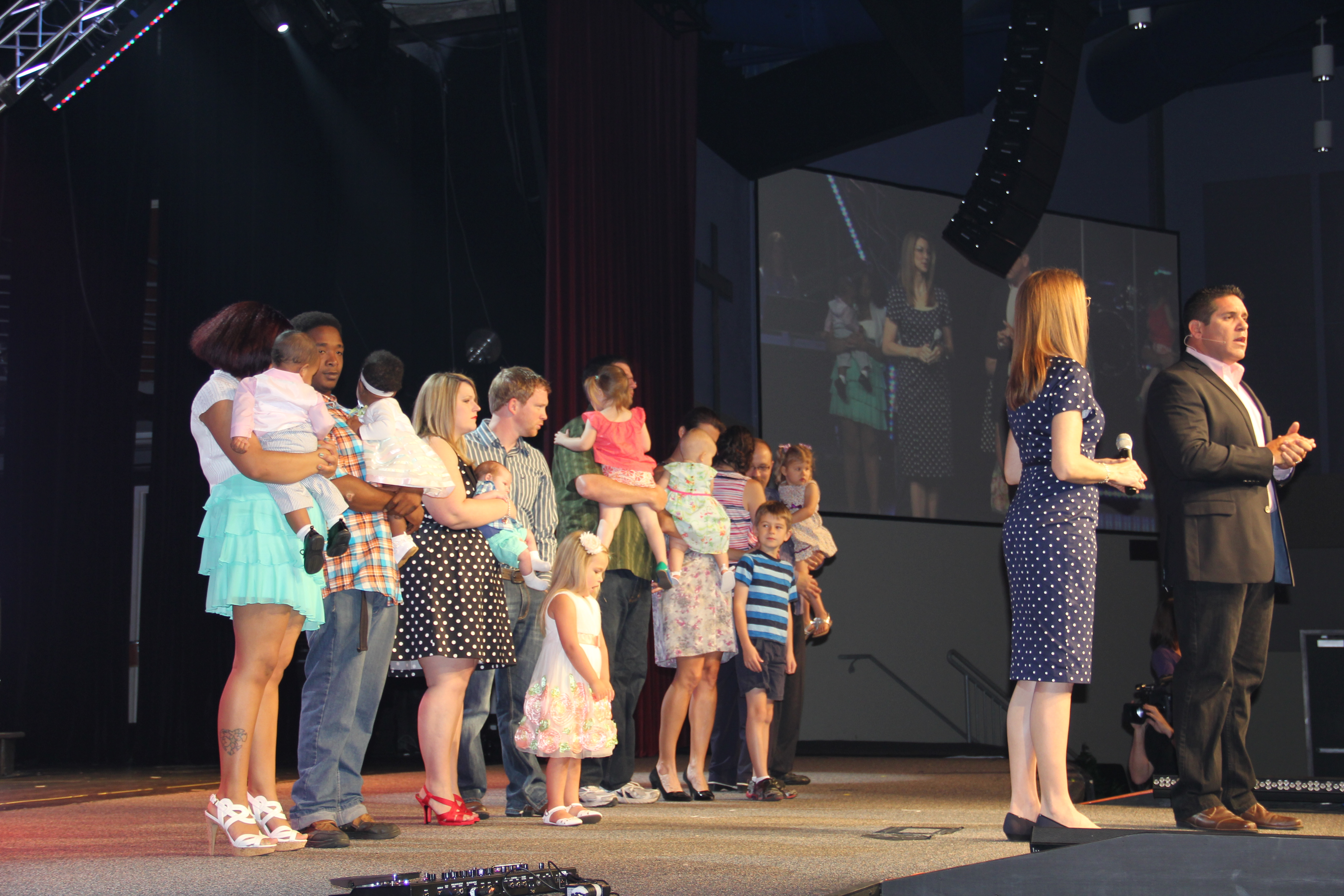
Child dedication at Crossing Church, Tampa, United States.

The form of the presentations may vary by church. The ceremony is usually performed before or after the Worship service of Sunday. When the parents have come forward with the child, the pastor presents it to the congregation, or asks the parents to do so. Most often, the pastor asks parents to say orally their commitment to raising the child in the Christian faith. This public commitment is followed by one or more prayers and a blessing by the pastor, often after the latter has taken the child into his arms. The purpose of the presentation is to express the recognition of parents and the church of the divine gift of birth and the responsibility of parents that results from it.

=== Practice by denomination ===
==== Baptist Churches ====
Many Baptist Churches contain rites for child dedication, in which parents commit to raise their children "in the fear and nurture of the Lord."

==== Methodist Churches ====
Many Methodist denominations, such as the Free Methodist Church and Allegheny Wesleyan Methodist Connection, practice infant baptism for families who desire it for their children, but provide a rite for child dedication for those who have a preference for credobaptism only after their child has made a personal acceptance of Jesus as their saviour.

== Woman's Christian Temperance Union ==
The Woman's Christian Temperance Union (WCTU) conducts a White Ribbon Recruit (WRR) ceremony, in which babies are dedicated to the cause of temperance through a white ribbon being tied to their wrists, with their adult sponsors pledging to help the child live a life free from alcohol and other drugs.

== See also ==
- Churching of women
