= Karin Johannesson =

Swedish bishop

The Right reverend Karin Johannesson
- Bishop of Uppsala
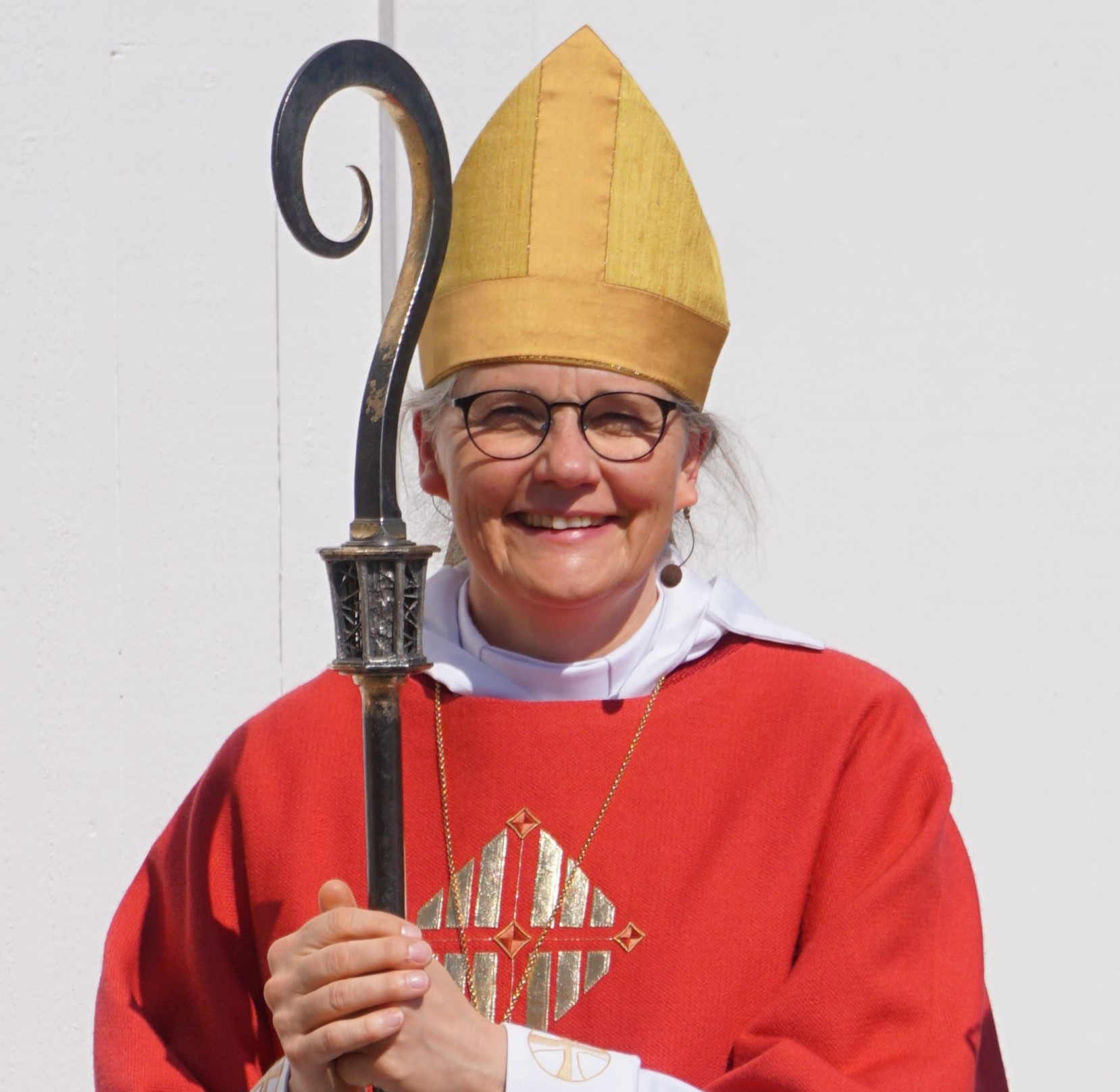
- Church: Church of Sweden
- Archdiocese: Uppsala
- In office: 2019–present
- Predecessor: Ragnar Persenius

Orders
- Ordination: 2010 by Esbjörn Hagberg
- Consecration: 3 March 2019 by Antje Jackelén

Personal details
- Born: 8 December 1970 (age 55) Filipstad, Värmland County, Sweden
- Denomination: Lutheran
- Education: Uppsala University
- Motto: Kristus förkunnar vi (We proclaim Christ)
- Coat of arms

Karin Maria Elisabet Johannesson (born 8 December 1970) is a Swedish prelate who is the current Bishop of Uppsala.

== Biography ==
Johannesson was born in Filipstad, Värmland County, Sweden on 8 December 1970 and was educated at the public school in Filipstad. She graduated with a Bachelor of Theology in 1994, and a bachelor's degree in 1996 from Uppsala University. She earned her PhD in theology and obtained a doctorate there in 2002. She was ordained priest in 2010 in the Diocese of Karlstad by Bishop Esbjörn Hagberg. Johannesson was accepted as an associate professor of religious philosophy at Uppsala University in 2015. On 3 March 2019 she was consecrated as Bishop of Uppsala by Antje Jackelén, Archbishop of Uppsala and Primate.

== Bibliography (publications in English) ==
Johannesson, K. (2007). God pro Nobis. On Non-Metaphysical Realism and the Philosophy of Religion. Studies in Philosophical Theology, vol. 37. Leuven: Peeters. ISBN 978-90-429-1856-6

Johannesson, K. (2013). "Concept if God in Contemporary Philosophy of Religion". In Encyclopedia of Sciences and Religions. ISBN 9781402082658

Johannesson, K. (2014) “Non-Metaphysical Realism. A Dummett-Inspired Implementation of Putnam’s Internal Realism”. European Journal for Philosophy of Religion, vol. 6. ISSN 1689-8311.

Johannesson, K. (2014) “Lutheran Spiritual Theology in a Post-Christian Society”. In Justification in a Post-Christian Society, Carl-Henric Grenholm & Göran Gunner (eds.). Church of Sweden Research Series, vol. 8. Eugene, Oregon: Pickwick Publications.ISBN 978-1-62564-889-1

Johannesson, K. (2016) ”The Holy Spirit and Lutheran Spirituality in the Twenty-First Century”. Seminary Ridge Review. ISSN 1526-0674.

Johannesson, K. (2023). Thérèse and Martin. Carmel and the Reformation in a New Light. Church of Sweden Research Series, vol. 21. Eugene, Oregon: Pickwick Publications. ISBN 978-1-6667-4619-8

Johannesson, K. (2023). "The bishop as mystagogue, prioress, and leader of the choir. Exploring the nature of episcopal authority in the Church of Sweden". International Journal for the Study of the Christian Church, vol. 23. doi:10.1080/1474225X.2023.2211313

Johannesson, K. (2024). "Graceful Ascesis, Christ and the Cross. Carmelite Teachers and Lutheran Doctrine in Today's Western World". One in Christ, vol. 56. ISSN: 0030-252X.
