= Ragnar Persenius =

Swedish former bishop (born 1952)

The Right Reverend Ragnar Persenius
- Bishop of Uppsala
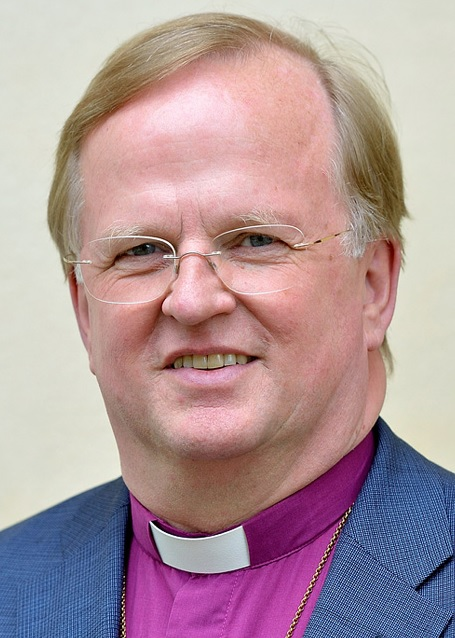
- Persenius in 2013
- Church: Church of Sweden
- Archdiocese: Uppsala
- Elected: 2000
- In office: 2000–2019
- Predecessor: Tord Harlin
- Successor: Karin Johannesson

Orders
- Ordination: 1973
- Consecration: 2000

Personal details
- Born: June 27, 1952 (age 74) Uppsala, Sweden
- Denomination: Lutheran
- Parents: Walter Persenius & Ingrid Svensson
- Spouse: Ingrid Persenius
- Children: 2
- Motto: Dispensatores gratiae dei (Trustee of God's Grace)
- Coat of arms

Per Ragnar Theodor Persenius (born 27 June 1952) was the Bishop of Uppsala from 2000 till his retirement in 2019. He previously headed the Church of Sweden's Department of Theology and Ecumenism.

== Biography ==
The son of Walter Persenius, pastor of Ullånger, he was born in Uppsala and grew up in Jämtland and Härjedalen. After attending Fjellstedtska School in Uppsala, he studied law, philosophy and theology, receiving a doctorate from Lund University in 1988.

Ordained in 1973, he first served as parish priest of Bro (1973–1976) before becoming educational advisor for the Diocese of Uppsala (1977–1980). Other appointments have included Parish Priest of Norrstrand, Karlstad, Church Secretary for Uppsala, the Church of Sweden's director for theological affairs, and head of its theology and ecumenism department (1993–1998). Before his ordination as bishop, he headed the Stora Sköndal Foundation in Stockholm.

Persenius lives with his wife Ingrid in a house near Uppsala Cathedral. He has a daughter, Susanna, but his son Martin died after a lengthy illness in 2007, causing him severe grief but reinforcing his faith. He came second in the elections for Archbishop of Uppsala in 2006 but is encouraging wider participation of candidates for the next elections in spring 2014. He likes to relax at his summer house in Söderhamn where he can paint, build and shovel snow.

== Published works ==
- Ragnar Persenius (2012). Längtan möter närvaro (in Swedish). Verbum. ISBN 978-91-526-3539-1.
- Ragnar Persenius (2000). Nådens budbärare: om den sakramentala folkkyrkan (in Swedish). Verbum. ISBN 978-91-526-2751-8.
- Ragnar Persenius (1987). Kyrkans identitet: en studie i kyrkotänkandets profilering inom Svenska kyrkan i ekumeniskt perspektiv, 1937-1952 (in Swedish). Verbum. ISBN 978-91-526-1503-4.
