= Jöns Gerekesson =

Danish religious leader

- Bishop of Skálholt
- Church: Roman Catholic
- Archdiocese: Skálholt
- In office: 1408–1421 (Uppsala); 1426–1433 (Skálholt)
- Predecessor: Henrik Karlsson (Uppsala); Árni Ólafsson (Skálholt)
- Successor: Johan Håkansson (Uppsala); Jón Vilhjálmsson Craxton (Skálholt)

Personal details
- Born: Denmark
- Died: 18 August 1433 Iceland
- Parents: Gereke Jensen Lodehat

The last name is a patronymic, not a family name; this person is properly referred to by the given name Jöns.

Jöns Gerekesson (Latin: Johannes Gerechini; Old Norse: Jón Gerreksson; c. 1380 – 1433) was a controversial archbishop of Uppsala in Sweden from 1408 to 1421, and the bishop of Skálholt in Iceland from 1426 to 1433 until he was murdered by being tied to a rock and drowned.

== Biography ==
It is not known when Jöns Gerekesson was born. His uncle, Peder Jensen Lodehat, was Bishop of Roskilde, Denmark and Chancellor to the Scandinavian queen, Margareta. Jöns studied at the University of Paris, graduating in 1401, and the University of Prague, where he graduated in 1404. He then worked as a canon in Aarhus before he became chancellor to the Scandinavian King Erik of Pomerania. On the death of the archbishop Henrik Karlsson (1408), the King appointed Jöns to take his place, despite protests from the cathedral chapter. Jöns was of Danish descent and had no connection to Uppsala. He held parties with female company, and lived a life of luxury and abundance.

He took a young woman from Stockholm as a mistress who bore him two children. Finally, the chapter complained to Pope Martin V and, after an investigation, in 1421 the Pope dismissed him from office. In 1426 he entered the duties of bishop of Skálholt, Iceland, and was formally ordained in 1430. Three years after being ordained, he was murdered. According to a later entry in an Icelandic annal, this was done by two Icelandic chieftains, Þorvarðr Loptsson and Teitur Gunnlaugsson. Their motive was partly revenge for acts of violence done to them by the bishop's retainers who had robbed them and subsequently taken them as prisoners to Skálholt where they were forced to perform menial labour which was an intense humiliation for men of their standing.

Another act that played a role in the killing was vengeance for the shooting of Ívar Vigfússon hólmur during the burning of Kirkjuból farm. The burning was itself an act of vengeance on Ívar's sister Margrét Vigfúsdóttir (ca. 1406–1486) who had refused to marry the bishop's illegitimate son Mangús. This so enraged Magnús that he set out with his men to try and burn her alive in her farmhouse at Kirkjuból. However Margrét escaped and promised to marry whoever avenged her brother. Although Þorvarðr had acted to avenge violence done to himself by the bishop's retainers, he had also avenged Ívar even if it was by killing Mangús' father the Bishop rather than Magnús himself who had fled the country. Margrét considered the killing a sufficient act of vengeance, honoured her promise and married Þorvarðr.

Ívar and Margrét's father was Vigfús Ívarsson Hólm who for many years had been the representative (hirðstjóri) of the Danish king in the region. Jöns had thus made bitter enemies of several high ranking Icelanders for no immediately discernible reason other than a desire to use his office to enrich himself as quickly as possible. Using secular or ecclesiastical offices for self enrichment was not in itself an unusual thing to do at the time and certainly not an offence that warranted killing Jöns any more than his transgressions in Sweden had been. Had Jöns not gone out of his way to humiliate and mistreat powerful local chieftains he would probably be remembered simply as a corrupt bishop.

== See also ==
- List of Skálholt bishops

== Sources ==
- Kyrkohistoriskt Personlexikon, by Carl Henrik Martling
- Nordisk familjebok (in Swedish)

Preceded by Árni Ólafsson	Bishop of Skálholt; 1426–1433	Succeeded by Jón Vilhjálmsson Craxton
