= Archdiocese of Uppsala =

Church of Sweden archdiocese

Archdiocese of Uppsala Archidioecesis Upsaliensis Uppsala ärkestift
- Arms of the archdiocese of Uppsala

- Flag

Location
- Country: Sweden
- Deaneries: 11 kontrakt
- Coordinates: 59°51′29″N 17°38′00″E

Statistics
- Parishes: 82
- Congregations: 136

Information
- Denomination: Church of Sweden
- Established: 11th century
- Cathedral: Uppsala Cathedral

Current leadership
- Bishop: Karin Johannesson
- Metropolitan Archbishop: Martin Modéus
- Bishops emeritus: Antje Jackelén; Anders Wejryd; K. G. Hammar

Map

Website
- svenskakyrkan.se/uppsalastift

The Archdiocese of Uppsala (Swedish: Uppsala ärkestift) is one of the thirteen dioceses of the Church of Sweden and the only one having the status of an archdiocese.

== Lutheran archdiocese ==
Uppsala is the seat of the Lutheran Archbishop of Uppsala. The diocese, which has its centre in the city of Uppsala, covers Uppsala County, Gävleborg County and parts of Stockholm County and Västmanland County. The archdiocese originally also included those parts of Norrland, which were included in the new Diocese of Härnösand when it was founded in 1647 and the City of Stockholm, which was made a diocese of its own in 1942.

As of 2005 the archdiocese consists of 201 parishes (församlingar or [historically] socknar) distributed over 86 pastorats and a smaller number of deaneries.

The archbishop, besides being head of Uppsala diocese, also has a central role in the Church of Sweden on a national level. Since 2022, the position of archbishop is held by Martin Modéus. An additional position as assistant bishop in Uppsala diocese was created in 1990. In 2000 the diocese was divided into two pastoral regions, the smaller part of which is pastored by the archbishop and the greater by the bishop in Uppsala diocese, the position of assistant bishop thus being made a bishop in his own right. This office has been held by Tord Harlin (1990–2000) and Ragnar Persenius (2001–2019), before the incumbent Karin Johannesson.

== Former Catholic archbishopric ==
When Ansgar, the Apostle of the North, went to Sweden in 829, the Swedes were still heathen and the country contained many sacrificial groves and temples for the worship of Germanic pagan idols. One of the most celebrated of the latter was the temple at Uppsala in what is now called Old Uppsala, the centre of idolatrous worship not only for Sweden but for all Scandinavia. Even after Christianity had spread through Sweden, heathen sacrifices were still maintained at Uppsala. The "Bishops' Chronicle", written by Adam of Bremen in the years 1072–76, says, "The Swedes have a well-known heathen temple called Upsala", and "Every ninth year, moreover, a great feast is celebrated at Upsala, which is observed in common by all the provinces of Sweden. None is permitted to avoid participation in the feast ... More horrible than any punishment is that even those who have become Christians must purchase exemption from participation in the feast ... The sacrifices are made thus: Nine heads are offered for every living creature of the male sex. By the blood of these the gods are appeased. The bodies are hung up in a grove not far from the temple. Dogs and horses may be seen hanging close by human beings; a Christian told me he had seen seventy-two bodies hanging together."

An episcopal see was established at Old Uppsala. One of the bishops was Henry, who took part in the Crusade to Finland led by king Eric IX of Sweden and suffered martyrdom there in 1157. The bishops of Sweden were first suffragans of the Archdiocese of Hamburg-Bremen, of which see Ansgar was archbishop when he died. Afterwards the Swedish bishops were suffragans of the Archbishop of Lund in Denmark, then Primate of Scandinavia.

In 1152 Cardinal Nicholas of Albano, later Pope Adrian IV, visited Sweden and held a provincial synod at Linköping. He had been commissioned to establish an independent Church province in Sweden, but the matter was deferred, as the Swedes could not agree upon the see of the archbishop. In 1164 Pope Alexander III established a separate ecclesiastical province of Sweden with the see at Uppsala. The suffragans were the Bishops of Skara, Linköping, Strängnäs and Västerås; at a later date the diocese of Växjö, as well as the diocese of Åbo in neighbouring Finland (which came to be ruled by the Swedish crown) were added.

The first Archbishop of Uppsala was Stephen, a Cistercian monk from the celebrated Alvastra Abbey. Cardinal William of Sabina came as papal legate to Sweden during the archiepiscopate of Jarler, a Dominican friar (1235–55). The legate had been commissioned, among other things, to establish cathedral chapters wherever such were lacking, and to grant them the exclusive right of electing the bishops. Another important matter which the legate had been ordered to carry out was the enforcement of the law of clerical celibacy. At a provincial synod held at Skänninge in 1248 under the presidency of the cardinal, the rules as to celibacy were made more severe. The pious and energetic Archbishop Jarler and his successor Laurentius (1257–67), a Franciscan, constantly strove to elevate the clergy and to enforce the law of celibacy. A century later Bridget (d. 1373), laboured zealously for the enforcement of the same law.

A new era arose in the history of the archdiocese when Archbishop Folke (1274–77) transferred the see from Old Uppsala to Aros, a town nearby on the Fyris which was given the name of Uppsala. This change was approved by the pope, the king and the bishops. The relics of the national saint, Eric, were also transferred to the new see. The cathedral of Uppsala, the most important church of Sweden and the largest in Scandinavia, was built by the French architect Etienne de Bonnuille in 1287. It was a masterpiece of the Gothic style, and is a monument of what Catholic art and Catholic self-sacrifice were able to create under the leadership of zealous archbishops and prelates.

The labours of the archbishops extended in all directions. Some were zealous pastors of their flocks, such as Jarler and others; some were distinguished canonists, such as Birger Gregersson (1367–83) and Olof Larsson (1435-8); others were statesmen, such as Jöns Bengtsson Oxenstierna (d. 1467), or capable administrators, such as Jacob Ulfsson Örnfot, who was distinguished as a prince of the Church, royal councillor, patron of art and learning, founder of the University of Uppsala and an efficient helper in the introduction of printing into Sweden. He died in the Carthusian monastery of Mariefred (Mary's Peace) in 1522. There were also scholars, such as Johannes Magnus (died 1544), who wrote the "Historia de omnibus Gothorum sueonumque regibus" and the "Historia metropolitanæ ecclesiæ Upsaliensis", and his brother Olaus Magnus (d. 1588), who wrote the "Historia de gentibus septentrionalibus" and who was the last Archbishop of Upsala.

The archbishops and secular clergy found active co-workers among the regular clergy. Among the orders represented in Sweden were the Benedictines, Cistercians, Dominicans, Franciscans, Brigittines (with the mother-house at Vadstena Abbey) and Carthusians. The monks and friars laboured in things spiritual and were also the teachers of the people in agriculture and gardening. Still greater credit is due the members of the orders, both men and women, for their services in the intellectual training of the people of Sweden. A Swedish Protestant investigator, Carl Silfverstolpe, wrote: "The monks were almost the sole bond of union in the Middle Ages between the civilization of the north and that of southern Europe, and it can be claimed that the active relations between our monasteries and those in southern lands were the arteries through which the higher civilization reached our country."

== See also ==
- Diocese of Sigtuna

== Sources and references ==
(incomplete)

- CatholicHierarchy- Sweden (only current diocese: Stockholm)
- GigaCatholic- Sweden
