= Skaufalabálkur =

Old Icelandic beast epic

Skaufalabálkur is a Middle Icelandic beast epic, the only surviving one from the Middle Ages. Its title may be translated 'The Lay of Shaggy-Tail' or 'The Poem of Sheaf-Tail'.

The title character is an old fox and the poem describes his final hunting trip in a mock heroic style. After killing a sheep, the fox is chased by a man and a dog. He escapes but is mortally wounded. In his den, he relates the story of his life before dying. Skaufalabálkur is a satire of the fornaldarsögur (legendary sagas). It is written in alliterative fornyrðislag metre. In the final stanza, it is referred to as barngælur (children's verses). The longest part of the poem, over half its total length, is the ævikviða, the dying hero's autobiographical poem.

There are contradictory authorial attributions of Skaufalabálkur. It is attributed in various sources to Einar fóstri, Sigurður fóstri or Svartur Þórðarson. Sources generally agree that the author also wrote Skíðaríma. This is supported by linguistic analysis, which also suggests that the same author wrote Bjarkarímur. It is now generally understood that the poet was in the employ of Björn Þorleifsson and his wife Ólöf Loftsdóttir at Skarð in the middle of the 15th century, although the sources exhibit some confusion between Björn and his grandfather, Björn Einarsson Jórsalafari.

Skaufalabálkur is known from two manuscripts. The earlier is the Hólsbók (shelfmark AM 603), a parchment manuscript from around 1530. The later, Rask 87, is a paper manuscript from the early 18th century, which may not be an independent witness to the text. The end of the poem in the Hólsbók was lost, probably when the manuscript was removed for safekeeping during the British bombardment of Copenhagen in 1807.

== Bibliography ==
- Amory, Frederic (1975). "Skaufalabalkur, its Author, and its Sources". Scandinavian Studies. 47 (3): 293–310. JSTOR 40917527.
- Deskis, Susan E. (1988). "The Fox and the Hero: Skaufalabálkur in Its Native Milieu". Reinardus: Yearbook of the International Reynard Society. 1 (1): 61–71. doi:10.1075/rein.1.09des.
- Hagtingius, Tobias (1978). "Skaufhalabálkur, the Song of Shaggy Tail". Marche Romane. 28: 69–88.
- Stocks, Grayson Del Faro (2017). Gods of the Shadows: Skauphalabólkur and the Icelandic Fox (Masters thesis). University of Iceland.
- Þorgeirsson, Haukur; Sayers, William (2023). "The Fox as a Dying Hero: An Edition and Translation of the Late Medieval Icelandic Poem Skaufalabálkur". Scandinavian-Canadian Studies. 30: 1–19. doi:10.29173/scancan239.
