= Vatnsfjarðar-Kristín Björnsdóttir =

Icelandic noblewoman (c. 1374–1458)

Kristín Björnsdóttir
- Born: 1374
- Died: 1458 (aged 83–84)
- Other name: Vatnsfjarðar-Kristín
- Spouse(s): Jón Guttormsson (1392–1403), Þorleifur Árnason (1405–1433)
- Children: Einar Þorleifsson, Björn Þorleifsson, Árni Þorleifsson, Helga (the elder) Þorleifsdóttir, Solveig Þorleifsdóttir, Helga (the younger) Þorleifsdóttir, Guðný Þorleifsdóttir
- Parent(s): Björn Einarsson Jórsalafari, Solveig Þorsteinsdóttir

Kristín Björnsdóttir (c. 1374–1458), often called Vatnsfjarðar-Kristín, was an Icelandic noblewoman in the 14th and 15th centuries and one of the richest people in Iceland during her day.

== Family ==
Kristín was the daughter of Björn Einarsson Jórsalafari and his wife Solveig Þorsteinsdóttir who lived in Vatnsfjörður in Ísafjarðardjúp. It is alleged, probably wrongly, that she had one brother, Þorleifur who had apparently been in peak health, while Kristín was sickly and confined to bed for long periods of time from a young age. Þorleifur drowned in Melgraseyri as an adult and, supposedly, when his corpse was brought home to Vatnsfjörður, Kristín shot up out of bed and was completely healthy from that point on, living to an old age. After her parents died, Kristín inherited all her family's wealth including dozens of plots of land spread widely throughout the Westfjords and several other assets. Many of the properties had provided access to fishing, driftwood and other resources. Kristín was considered a force to be reckoned with and very generous.

=== Marriages ===
Kristín married twice. Her first husband, Jón, whom she married in 1392, was the brother of Loftur Guttormsson and later died in the Black Plague. They lived in Hvammur in Dalir and had a son who was also named Jón who died when he was a teenager; Kirstín inherited a lot of wealth from him. She later married Þorleifur Árnason, a sýslumaður with many holdings in northern Iceland, such as the manors Auðbrekka in Hörgárdalur, Glaumbær in Skagafjörður, and many other properties in Húnaþing. She lived in Vatnsfjörður after he died, but spent her final years in Æðey. She was typically known by Vatnsfjörður although she never owned land there. Her mother Solveig gave Kristín's son Björn property there in 1433.

=== Children ===
Kristín and Þorleifur's children, five of whom married Loftur Guttormsson's children, were:

- Einar Þorleifsson, a seneschal
- Björn Þorleifsson, seneschal of Skarð and husband to Ólöf Loftsdóttir
- Árni of Glaumbær who married Soffía Loftsdóttir
- Helga the elder who married Guðmundur Arason ríki ("the rich") in Reykhólar; mother of Solveig Guðmundsdóttir
- Solveig Þorleifsdóttir, a housewife in Víðidalstunga and Breiðabólsstaður, wife of Ormur Loftsson
- Helga the younger, a housewife in Holtastaðir in Langadalur, wife of Skúli Loftsson
- Guðný, wife of Eiríkur Loftsson slógnefur of Grund in Eyjafjörður
