= Björn Einarsson =

Björn Einarsson may refer to:

- Björn Einarsson Jórsalafari (died 1415), Icelandic travel writer
- Björn Einarsson (bandy) (Born 1978), Swedish bandy player
