= History of Icelandic =

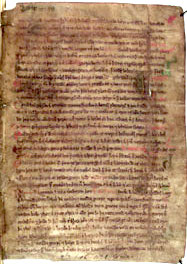
A page from the Landnámabók

The history of the Icelandic language began in the 9th century when the settlement of Iceland, mostly by Norwegians, brought a dialect of Old Norse to the island.

The oldest preserved texts in Icelandic were written around 1100, the oldest single text being Íslendingabók followed by Landnámabók. Some of the poetry, such as the Eddas, that were written down a little later nevertheless contain older language because poetic language was kept in memory unchanged over sometimes a remarkably long time. The most famous of these, written in Iceland from the 12th century onward, are without doubt the Icelandic Sagas, the historical writings of Snorri Sturluson, and the Poetic Edda.

The language of the era of the sagas is called Old Icelandic, a dialect of (Western) Old Norse, the common Scandinavian language of the Viking Age. The Danish rule of Iceland from 1380 to 1918 had little effect on the evolution of Icelandic, which remained in daily use among the general population: Danish was not used for official communications.

Though Icelandic is considered more archaic than other living Germanic languages, especially in its morphology and other grammatical aspects, as well as in its lexicon, the language has nevertheless been subject to some important changes. The pronunciation, for instance, changed considerably between the 12th and 16th centuries, especially that of vowels.

Nevertheless, written Icelandic has changed relatively little since the 13th century. As a result of this, and of the similarity between the modern and ancient grammar, modern speakers can still understand, more or less, the original sagas and Eddas that were written some 800 years ago. This ability is sometimes mildly overstated by Icelanders themselves, most of whom actually read the Sagas with updated modern spelling and footnotes—though otherwise intact.

== The language of the Norwegian settlers ==
Most of the original settlers of Iceland came from Western Norway, bringing with them the western dialect of Old Norse. Due to its geographic isolation and consequent lack of influence from other stratum languages, the development of the language was entirely independent. However, it would be wrong to suggest that the language that was brought to Iceland was completely homogeneous; even though most of the settlers were from western Norway, there were a number from other parts of the country and also from other Scandinavian countries. Therefore, the language that grew up in Iceland was influenced by all of the Norwegian dialects of the time. The close intermingling of the people of the island, especially at the Alþingi (the general meeting that took place at the beginning of each summer at Þingvellir) contributed to even out the differences between the various dialects: traits common to all dialects were reinforced, while the most marked differences gradually disappeared. Although it is not known exactly how the language developed, modern Icelandic has evolved less than other Scandinavian languages. The unique development of Icelandic, which eventually resulted in its complete separation from Norwegian and the other Scandinavian languages, began with the landnám or first settlement. Icelandic has lost all trace of the tonal nature of early Scandinavian languages, traces of which are noticeable in modern Norwegian and especially Swedish. Research has been carried out to identify certain traits of the language, for example the so-called preaspiration, but the results were inconclusive. Icelandic shares such characteristics with two other languages: Faroese and the Swedish spoken in Finland.

== The Scandinavian period (550–1050) ==
The period from 550 to 1050 is called the Scandinavian or "Common Nordic" period. During this time, a notably unified common language was spoken throughout Scandinavia. The key position of Denmark as the focal point of the whole area meant that the language was often simply called "Danish" (dǫnsk tunga). Even though the first hints of individual future developments were already identifiable in different parts of the vast region, there were no problems with mutual intelligibility.

With regard to the dǫnsk tunga spoken in Iceland, there are no written documents from this period. Ancient Scandinavian runes were certainly widely known but were never used to write on papyrus (except Codex Runicus) or skin. Few runic inscriptions have been found and nearly all are dated after 1200.

== Ancient Scandinavian or Norse (1050–1350) ==
The period from 1050 to 1350 is known as Old Scandinavian, Old Nordic, or Norse. There are numerous manuscripts and documents dating from this period, which allows researchers to characterize Icelandic from this period accurately.

All of the documents use the Latin alphabet, which was introduced to Iceland in the 12th century. Laws were transcribed onto vellum for the first time in 1117–1118. The first manuscripts among those still in our possession date back to the second half of the 12th century. Sometime in the latter half of the 12th century the First Grammatical Treatise (Fyrsta Málfrœðiritgerðin) was composed, a highly original description of the language unique in Europe at the time. The treatise was concerned with the sounds of the language; it described the internal workings of the phonological system in much the same way as modern linguistic methodology. The manuscript, today kept in Reykjavík at the Handritastofnun Íslands ('Manuscript Institute of Iceland') is a later copy of the original text. Three other grammatical treaties were composed in the following decades.

Although the oldest manuscripts date back to around 1150, they show structures that were in use from around 900. This is particularly true of the ancient epic poetry, which, due to its metric structure and oral tradition, conserved notably archaic forms. Between 1050 and 1350 Icelandic began to develop independently from other Scandinavian and Germanic languages; it is particularly conservative in its inflectional morphology and notably homogeneous across the country. From the manuscripts it has not been possible to determine whether dialects ever existed in Iceland; all indications suggest that from the outset the language has maintained an extraordinary level of homogeneity.

Around 1300, the Danish language saw a very rapid evolution in both its phonology and its morphology. Given that changes to a spoken language are often only recorded later in the written language, it is probable that in spoken Danish these changes occurred around 1250 and perhaps even earlier. The rapid evolution of Danish (a simplification comparable to that seen between Old English and Middle English) gave rise to a marked difference between the north and south of Scandinavia. In 1350 Danish assumed characteristics that are still seen in the language today.

Norwegian and Swedish developed more slowly, but show equally notable differences from Icelandic, which is always more conservative and has maintained even to this day many common Scandinavian features.

In Norwegian a kind of vocalic harmony developed, in which a syllable after a stressed syllable with a high vowel ([i], [u]) exhibited only a high vowel (systir 'sister', cf. Icelandic systir), while a syllable after a stressed syllable with a mid vowel ([e], [o]) showed only a mid vowel (broþer "brother", cf. Icelandic bróðir). Such innovation was only accepted in eastern Norwegian and in Swedish (Mod. Norwegian, Swedish bro[de]r), while in Icelandic there is no trace of it.

With regard to consonants, Continental Scandinavian languages and most other Germanic languages lost the series of fricatives /θ, ð/, which were retained only in Icelandic and English (which shows here a notably archaic phonological trait). They were replaced with the corresponding dentals /t, d/ (Norwegian, Swedish tung "heavy" smed "smith", cf Icelandic þungr, smiðr (modern Icelandic þungur, smiður).

Icelandic is the only Germanic language to have conserved the word-initial consonant sequences ⟨hl, hr, hn⟩, at least from a graphic point of view (their pronunciation is in part modified by the desonorization of the second consonantal element): Icelandic hljóð, hrafn, hneta, cf English loud, raven, nut, Swedish ljud, ramn (toponymic only), nöt, German Laut, Rabe, Nuss.

Again along with English, Icelandic is unusual among Germanic languages to have conserved, if only at a local level, the pronunciation [xw] of the word-initial consonantal cluster ⟨hv⟩: Icelandic hvað, hvalur [ˈxwaːð, ˈxwaːlʏr], more commonly [ˈkʰvað, ˈkʰvaːlʏr]. In English what, whale, the ⟨wh⟩ represents /ʍ/ only in certain dialects. The other Germanic languages have consonantized the cluster: German was, Wal-fisch [v-], Dutch wat, wal-vis, Swedish vad, val[fisk]. Until the early years of the 20th century Swedish maintained the orthography in words such as hvad, hvalfisk, which is purely historical. In Danish one writes but does not pronounce [hv-]: hvad, hval-fisk [ˈvæːð, ˈvælfisɡ̊], while in Nynorsk, in some cases, one writes and pronounces [kv-] (kva), exactly as is usual in modern Icelandic (southern dialect and literary). There are also indications that ⟨h⟩ was originally pronounced [x].

An important vocalic development, also from a morphological standpoint, was the disappearance of word-final -r with the addition of epenthetic /ʏ/, written as ⟨u⟩: Old Icelandic akr, gestr, merkr, þú gefr became Modern Icelandic akur, gestur, merkur, þú gefur.

In the old language the verbs forming past tense with the dental suffix (corresponding to -d in English) were apart in the first and third person, ending with -a in the first person but -i in the third person. The first person took the form of the third person and are now identical. This is the only alteration in person inflection from the old language, here in stark contrast to the other Scandinavian languages where they vanished completely and halved in Faroese.

=== "Classical Old Icelandic" ===
In the field of textual scholarship, Classical Old Icelandic refers to a normalized version of written Icelandic based on the language present in the Old Icelandic Homily Book (c. 1200). This standard of normalization was developed by Ludvig Wimmer in 1877, and is widely used by publishers of editions of medieval texts today, such as Íslenzk fornrit, though other standards also exist. The purpose of the standard is to make the text more legible to the modern reader by removing variation and inconsistencies in original manuscripts, since the medieval language had no standard orthography. Classical Old Icelandic can also be used as a standardized form of the language for new learners.

== Middle Icelandic (1350–1550) ==
The current spelling of the language is unchanged from about 1300. In discussing the development of the language it is usually most convenient to divide it into two sections where the changes prior to the current spelling are outlined in the former and later changes in another. In the period from 1350 to 1550, coinciding with the total loss of independence and Danish rule, the difference between Norwegian and Icelandic grew even larger. Norway also fell to the Danish Crown, and Danish became its official language, which led to the formation of a hybrid Dano-Norwegian language, the basis of the modern Bokmål (successfully "re-Norwegianized" only in the 20th century). Only in western Norway (whence came the original settlers of Iceland) were the dialects kept relatively pure and free from Danish influence, so much so that in the second half of the 19th century the linguist Ivar Aasen created an authentic Norwegian idiom on the basis of them, first called landsmål "national language" and later nynorsk or "neo-Norwegian", which obtained immediate recognition as an official language of the state and is now particularly used in Western Norway. All the continental Scandinavian languages evolved in this period from more synthetic to more analytic languages, and with the Reformation begin to assume a modern character. However Icelandic in this period shows a dichotomy. On the one hand it retained, practically unaltered, its rich inflectional morphology; on the other it underwent a phonological reorganization comparable in its scope to the development from Middle English to Modern English. To cite only the most important changes:

- In the vowel system the long vowels /aː, eː, ɛː, oː/ became diphthongs, and the quality of /iː, uː/ changed. Already in the 1200s the vowels -a -o & -u before -lf, -lm, -ln, lp, become longer (they become double wovels or become unstressed), the -f in turn softens to -v (yet to be accounted for in obligatory spelling); (elf) alfr-álfur, (half) halfr -hálfur, (wolf) úlfr - úlfur, (hill) holmr - hólmur. In the 15th and 16th centuries the vowels /y, yː/ lost their rounding and merged with /i, iː/. New diphthongs were formed, often under the influence of preceding or following consonants and, in general, the pronunciation of short vowels became less tense: they are now very lax. Orthography changed: the letters ⟨œ⟩ and ⟨ǫ⟩ were replaced by ⟨æ⟩ and ⟨ö⟩: Old Icelandic bøkr, lǫndom became Modern Icelandic bækur, löndum. The vowel letter ⟨o⟩ in many morphemes (probably already pronounced [ʏ] in the early period) changed to ⟨u⟩: londom, vér gefom, þeir ero > löndum, við gefum, þeir eru. However the pronunciation of unaccented vowels remained very clear, compared to what happened in the other Scandinavian and Germanic languages, a factor that played an important role in the conservation of some forms.
- The digraph ⟨au⟩, which in Old Icelandic signified the same thing as it does in Spanish or German ([au], similar to the ⟨ow⟩ in English "how"), changed to [œy], which is similar to German ⟨eu⟩ ([ɔʏ]), but starting with [œ] (i.e. Icelandic ⟨ö⟩) instead of [ɔ] (i.e. Icelandic ⟨o⟩).
- The consonant system underwent even more profound transformations. Phenomena such as palatalization appeared through contact, forming consonant phonemes that were probably previously absent. The most obvious change was the formation of unvoiced consonants: unvoiced consonants became aspirated, while voiced consonants lost their vibration while retaining their articulation. Another very notable phenomenon is preaspiration, in which certain consonant clusters are preceded by a complete closure of the vocal cords followed a light aspiration. Other consonant clusters developed an unvoiced dental element (prestopping). Neither phenomenon is written, which reflects the fact that they are (still) merely phonetic (i. e., are not used to distinguish meanings) and have not (yet) become phonological (but this is a common phenomenon in many languages of cultures like English, French and Danish). Morphophonetic phenomena have also developed, some of them denoted by the graphemes (gef þú > gefðu etc.)

Despite this phonetic 'earthquake', some very ancient and fundamental characteristics were retained, like the conservation of word-final unaccented vowels [i, u, a], elsewhere reduced to an indistinct schwa [ə]; as stated, this is probably the principal cause of the morphological conservation.

== Modern Icelandic ==
Around 1550, with the Lutheran Reformation, the introduction of printing and the consequent translation of the Bible, modern Icelandic was definitively formed. Compared to other Scandinavian and Germanic languages (with the partial exception of Faroese and German), Icelandic certainly remained at an earlier evolutionary stage in terms of its morphology, but this should not imply that the language did not change; the phonological developments of the language from the ancient to the modern language are enormous. A conservative writing system, rich inflectional morphology and a lexicon that is resistant to loanwords (instead preferring neologisms formed from native material) obscures the true nature of modern Icelandic, which is a modern language like any other; Russian, Polish and Hungarian, as examples, have a morphological system at least as complex as that of Icelandic, and Hungarian, moreover, behaves exactly like Icelandic in terms of its acceptance of most loanwords. As is often said of Icelandic people, they have no difficulty in reading works of medieval literature, but to speak to their ancestors they would probably need an interpreter. The most consistent changes have been that to the vowel system, which followed the segmental phonological quantity in the 16th century or perhaps as early as the 14th century, and the consequent development of diphthongs. In the consonant system there have also been notable changes, for example the desonorization of plosives, the rise of a correlative sonorant for nasals and liquids (pre-stopping) and preaspiration.

The modern Icelandic alphabet has developed from a standard established in the 19th century primarily by the Danish linguist Rasmus Rask. It is ultimately based heavily on an orthographic standard created in the early 12th century in a mysterious document known as The First Grammatical Treatise by an anonymous author who has later been referred to as the 'First Grammarian'. The later Rasmus Rask standard was basically a re-enactment of the old treatise, with some changes to fit concurrent Germanic conventions, such as the exclusive use of k rather than c. Various old features, like ð, had actually not seen much use in the later centuries, so Rask's standard constituted a major change in practice. Later 20th century changes include most notably the adoption of é, which had previously been written as je (reflecting the modern pronunciation), and the abolition of z in 1973.

=== Linguistic purism ===
During the 18th century, the Icelandic authorities implemented a stringent policy of linguistic purism. Under this policy, some writers and terminologists were put in charge of the creation of new vocabulary to adapt the Icelandic language to the evolution of new concepts, without resorting to borrowed neologisms as in many other languages. A few old words that had fallen into disuse were updated to fit in with the modern language, and neologisms were created from Old Norse roots. For example, the word rafmagn ("electricity") literally means "amber power" – a calque of the Greek elektron ("amber"); similarly the word sími ("telephone") originally meant "wire", and tölva ("computer") combines tala ("digit"; "number") and völva ("female fortuneteller").

== Foreign influences on Icelandic ==
=== Toponyms ===
Even though the vast majority of Icelandic toponyms are native and clearly interpretable (for example Ísa-fjörður "ice fjord", Flat-ey "flat island", Gull-foss "golden waterfall", Vatna-jökull "water glacier", Reykja-vík "bay of smoke", Blanda "the mixed (river)" (which is formed by the confluence of different rivers)) there are some that up to now have resisted any plausible interpretation, even in the light of the Celtic languages. For example, Esja (a mountain on Kjalarnes), Ferstikla (a farm near Hvalfjörður), Vigur (an island in Ísafjarðardjúp), Ölfus (an area of Árnessýsla, traversed by the river Hvíta-Ölfusá), Tintron (a volcanic crater in Lyngdalsheiði), Kjós (the area that gives its name to Kjósarsýsla), Bóla (a farm in Skagafjörður) and Hekla (a famous Icelandic volcano). Such toponyms pose numerous problems, but the main one can be stated in a very simple question: if they are neither Icelandic nor Celtic, which language do they come from? Perhaps they have been taken from a language (or languages) of unknown ethnicity, or perhaps (and this is a fascinating though highly improbable hypothesis) these names are a sign that Iceland was already inhabited not only before the landnám, but even preceding the arrival of the first Irish hermits. But who were these people? Some scholars, such as Árni Óla, have concerned themselves with the question, attempting to demonstrate this hypothesis, which would force a complete rewrite of Icelandic history. Others have asserted that since Icelandic is an imported language, such names could in reality be traced back to some unknown substrate of Norwegian (comparisons have consequently been made with Northern Sami and other Uralic languages), and have therefore been transplanted to the island by colonists who originated from parts of Norway where such substrate languages would have still been present. Naturally, there have been numerous attempts to explain the names in terms of Icelandic: Kjós, for example, could come from the root of the verb kjósa, and therefore mean "the chosen land"; moreover, there is also the common Norwegian surname Kjus. Bóla could be simply ból "dwelling, habitation", from the root of the verb búa "inhabit", present in many names of farms such as Aðal-ból "main farm".

=== Danish influence ===
The efforts of the government in Copenhagen to make Danish the official language of Iceland have left in their wake many Danish terms in official documents, but they have little lasting success. The rural population remained faithful to their own ancestral language, while Danish borrowings were used only by a restricted class of ageing educated people who were heavily influenced by Danish culture and lived only in Reykjavík. So when the battle for the purification of Icelandic from all Danicisms began in the 19th century, the groundwork had already been laid. The purification campaign was such a success that Danish borrowings were almost completely eliminated. Only a few terms by now stable in the spoken and administrative language survive, like ske "happen" (cf. Danish ske, corresponding to German ge-schehen), fordæma "pass sentence", (cf. Danish fordømme), the adverbs kannske (more commonly kannski) and máske "perhaps, maybe" (cf. Danish kanske, måske, lit. "can happen") and some nouns like blýantur "pencil, crayon", fangelsi "prison" and frímerki "postage stamp" (cf. Danish blyant, fængsel, frimærke).

=== Gaelic influences ===
These influences are very slight and most notable in simple Gaelic names that have been more common in Iceland than elsewhere in Scandinavia over the centuries, Njáll – Niall, Brjánn – Brian, Kaðlín – Caitlín, Patrekur – Padraig, Konall – Conall, Trostan – Triostan, Kormákur – Cormac.

=== Influences of other languages ===
Influences of other languages are relatively insignificant. Certainly, many terms of Latin origin are present in Icelandic, but these date back to the common Germanic period and are present in all the other Germanic languages. For example, kaupa "to buy" < Latin caupō, pappír "paper" (German Papier, English paper < Latin papyrus) and keisari "emperor" (German Kaiser, Swedish kejsare < Latin Caesar).

Latin borrowings dating back to the introduction of Christianity include kredda "creed, dogma" (< Latin credo) and predika "prophesy, preach" (< Latin prædicare; cf. German predigen); more recently the very common náttúra "nature", persóna "person" (originally Etruscan, one of the few remaining words in use of that language) and partur "part". With regard to modern languages, Icelandic has been influenced (in recent times quite heavily) only by English, particularly in the technical lexis and by the younger generation. In languages such as Italian, English words are simply borrowed just as they are; in contrast, in Icelandic they are adapted to the local phonetic and morphological system. For example, pönkarar and rokkarar ("punk rockers" and just plain "rockers") who play á parketi diskótekanna "on the parquet of the discothèques".

== See also ==
- Icelandic phonology
- Greenlandic Norse
- Old Norse
- Old Norwegian
- Vowel shift
