= Guta-Sintram Codex =

12th-century illuminated manuscript

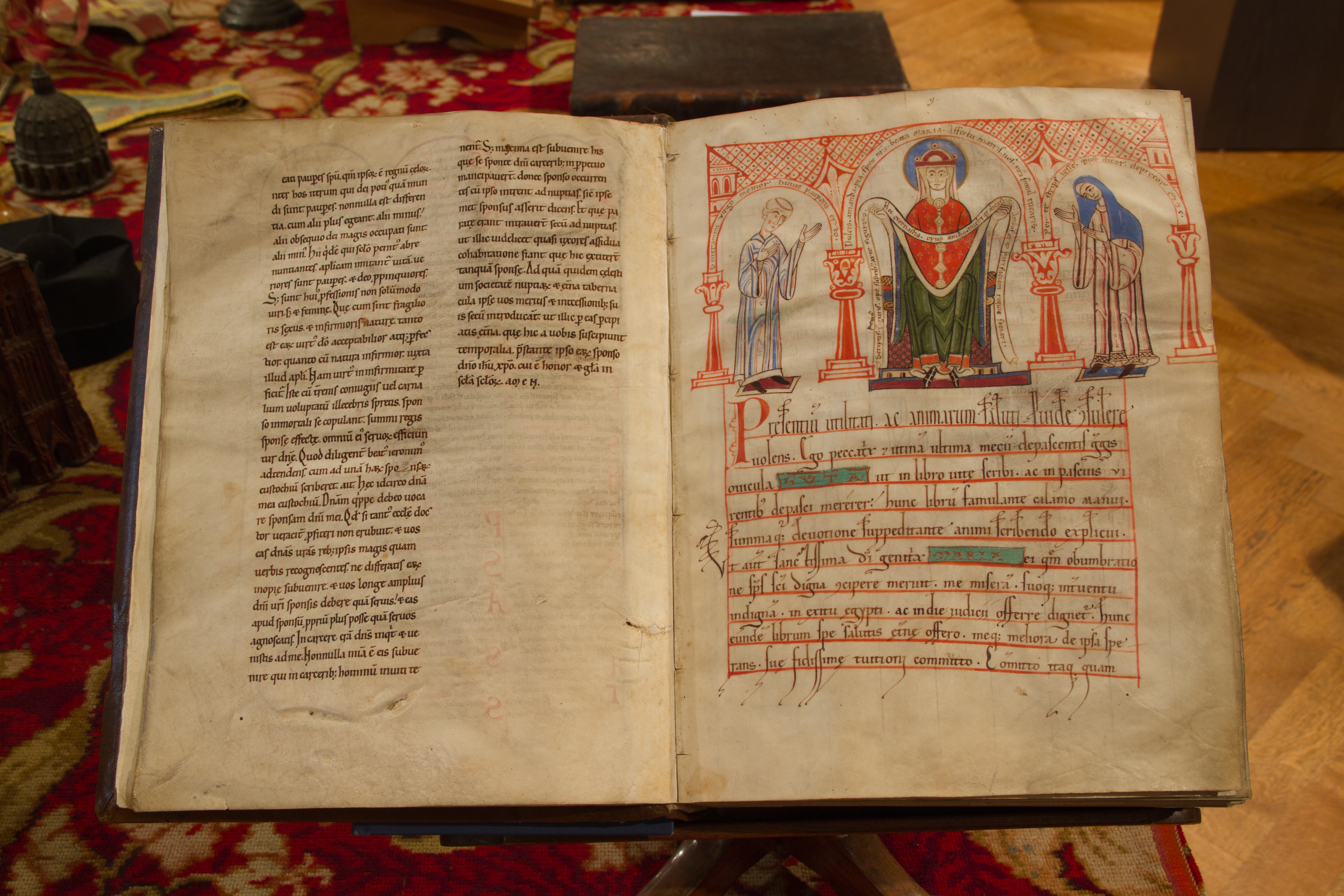
Miniature from the Guta-Sintram Codex depicting Guta and Sintram with the Virgin Mary.

The Guta-Sintram Codex (also known as "Strasbourg, Bibliothèque du Grand séminaire, MS 37") is an illuminated manuscript copied in 12th-century Alsace. The manuscript is well known for its depiction of its scribe and its illuminator. It was produced for the female Augustinian community of Schwartzenthann in 1154. The codex received its name from those of its scribe and illuminator, Guta and Sintram. Guta was a canoness at Schwartzenthann. She identified herself as a scribe multiple times within the manuscript. Sintram was a canon and priest at Marbach and the artist who completed the manuscript's illuminations. The dedicatory miniature depicts the Virgin Mary (centre), Sintram (to her right), and Guta (to her left). This is one of the only known depictions of a female scribe from the Middle Ages.

== Description ==
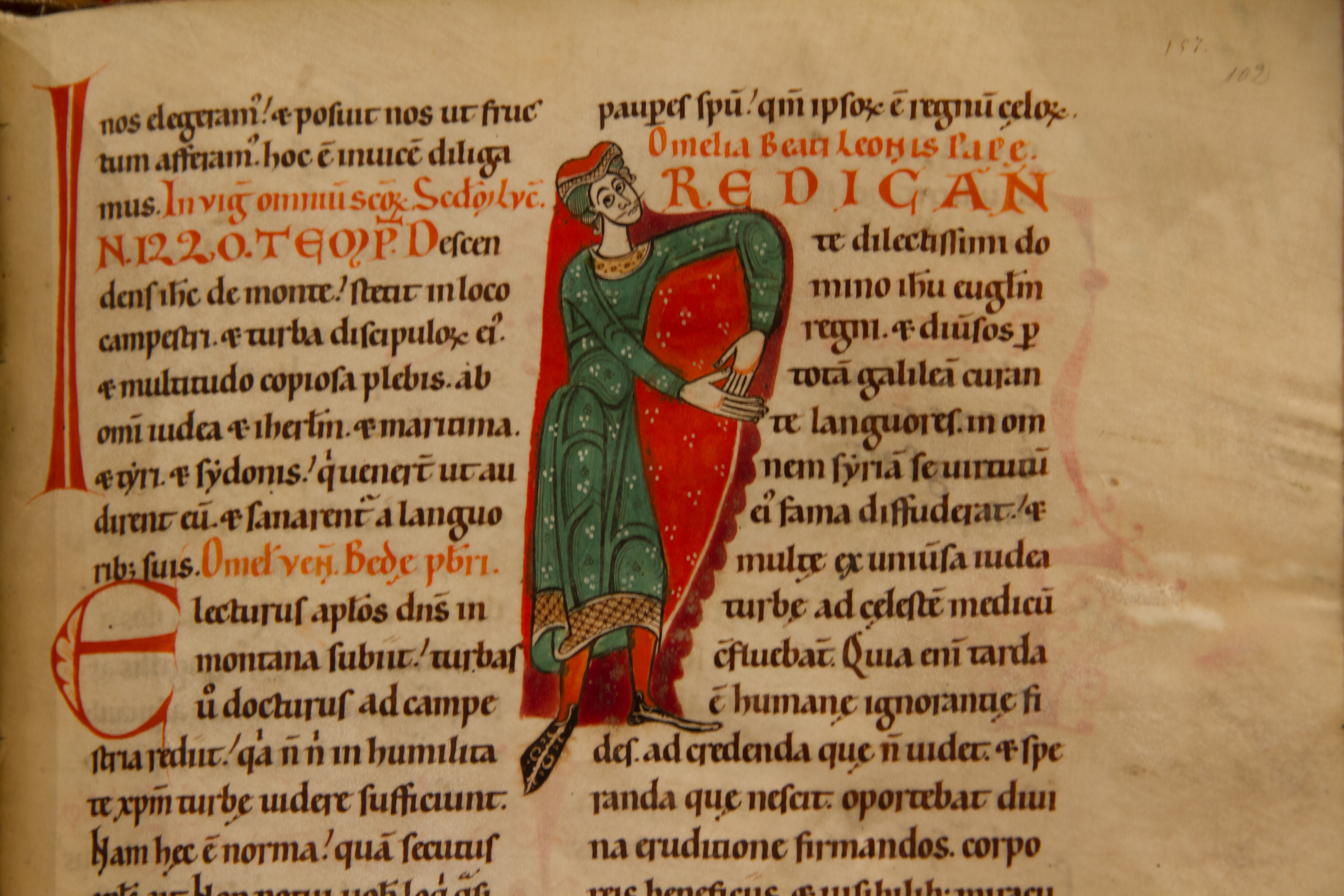
Decorated initial "P" within the homiliary (detail).

The manuscript is written on parchment and decorated in the Romanesque style. It is 356 by 270 mm (14.0 by 10.6 in). The binding is leather and of the seventeenth century (1682). In its current form, the manuscript consists of 163 folios. The texts within the manuscript are written in Latin. The constituent texts of the manuscript include:

- a martyrology/necrology (saints and other deceased, listed in calendrical order): this portion of the manuscript also includes medicinal and dietary advice
- a homiliary
- Augustinian rules

It is interesting to note that many of the texts within this manuscript would have been suited for public reading during the morning meeting in chapter after Prime: the martyrology, the necrology, and the Rule were all to be read on this occasion.

== History ==
The colophon and the dedicatory miniature discussed above document the collaboration between Guta and Sintram in the production of the manuscript, illustrating that men and women could work closely together in medieval scriptoria. In the dedicatory miniature, the Virgin Mary is shown to recognize the collaborative nature of this endeavour: ‘Together, you have adorned this work, which you have dedicated to me, with letters and figures achieved with skill. Together I will make you to share in the same repose’. The manuscript also attests to the close links between Marbach and Schwartzenthann. Marbach was originally founded as a double house, a religious community which housed both men and women, in 1089. Schwartzenthann was then founded in 1124 with nuns from Marbach. The Guta-Sintram codex appears to have been in use at Schwartzenthann up until the end of the fourteenth century, given the names added to the necrology. The manuscript was at Marbach by 1682, when it was rebound there. The precise manner by which the manuscript became part of the holdings of the Bibliothèque du Grand séminaire in Strasbourg is not known. This presumably took place after Marbach was secularized in 1786 and/or after it was demolished in 1790.
