= Old Norwegian Homily Book =

Collection of Old West Norse sermons

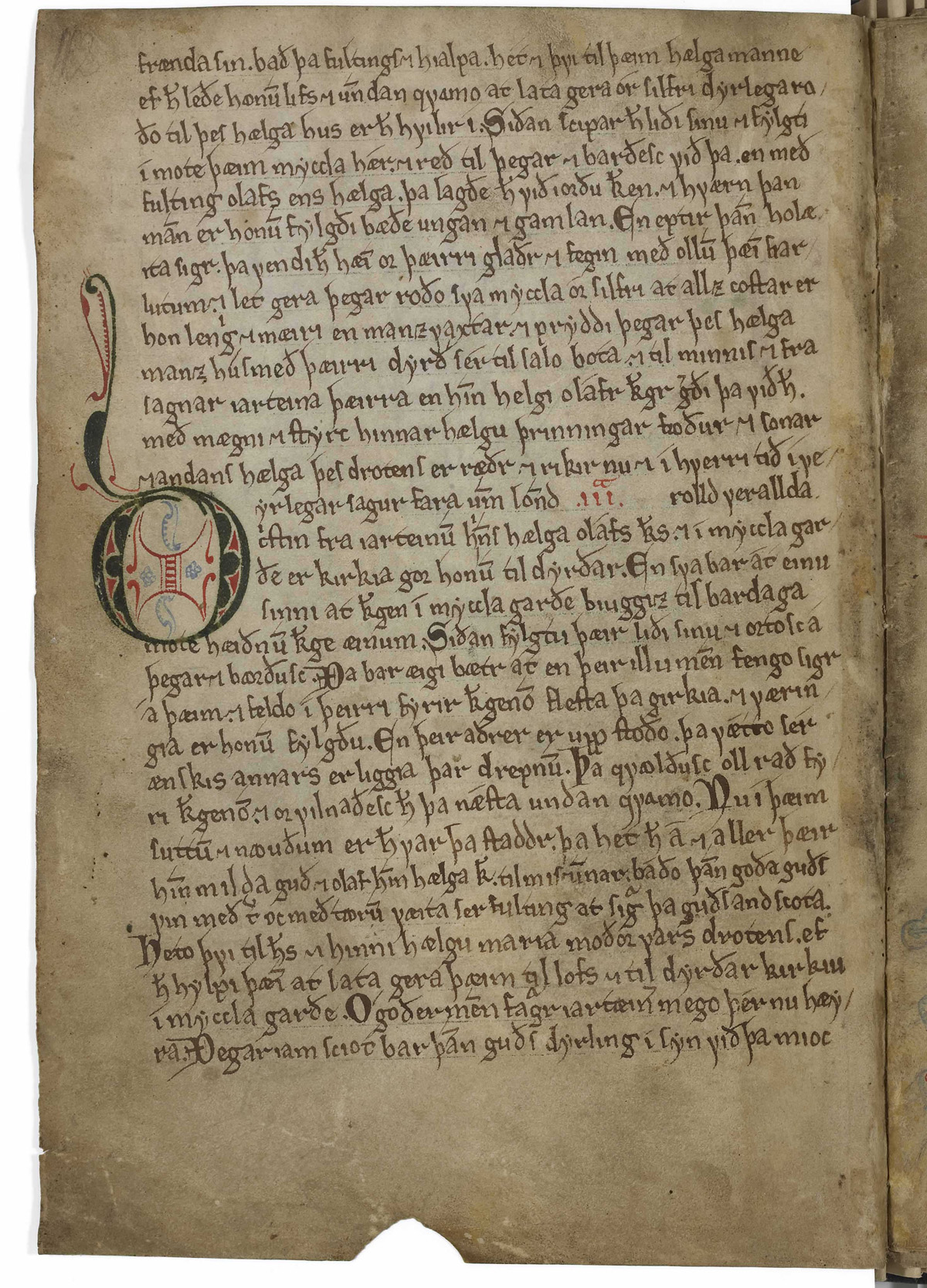
Old Norwegian Homily Book.

The Old Norwegian Homily Book (AM 619 4to) is one of two main collections of Old West Norse sermons. The manuscript was written around 1200, contemporary with the other principal collection of sermons, the Old Icelandic Homily Book; together they represent some of the earliest Old West Norse prose. The two homily books have 11 texts in common, all of which are based on earlier exemplars. Two of these texts, the 'Stave-church Homily' and a St. Michael’s Day sermon, are also found in one of the oldest Icelandic manuscript fragments, AM 237a fol., which was written around 1150.

Linguistic features suggest that the manuscript was written in Western Norway. The Benedictine monasteries of Sancti Albani at Selja and Munkalíf in Bergen, and the Augustinian house of Jónskirkja, also in Bergen, have been proposed as possible candidates for producing the manuscript. The latest publication on the Norwegian homily book, however, argues that it belongs to a group of Old Norwegian and Latin books which were presumably not intended for a Benedictine community, and that it most likely was written in the town of Bergen itself, either at Jónskirkja or the Cathedral Chapter.

The core of the Old Norwegian Homily Book is a series of homilies ordered according to the church year, but it also contains material which is not homiletic in character, such as a complete translation of Alcuin’s De virtutibus et vitiis, as well as commentaries on the Lord’s Prayer and the service of the mass. For this reason, it is better considered a homiletic hand-book rather than a homiliary. Further, despite its name, the ‘homilies’ it contains are closer in character to the definition of sermons.

Its style is simple, and similar to that of the Íslendingasögur, unlike later religious prose which makes use of Latinate syntax and vocabulary.

== See also ==
- Old Icelandic Homily Book
