= Soffía Loftsdóttir =

15th-century Icelandic noblewoman

- Born: 1418
- Died: 1482 (aged 63–64)
- Spouse(s): Árni Þorleifsson (1434–1440); Bjarni Ívarsson (?–1473)
- Children: Þorleifur Árnason, Ormur Bjarnason
- Parent(s): Loftur Guttormsson and Ingibjörg Pálsdóttir
- Relatives: Ólöf Loftsdóttir (sister), Eiríkur Loftsson slógnefur (brother), Ormur Loftsson (half-brother), Skúli Loftsson (half-brother)

Soffía Loftsdóttir (c. 1418–1482) was an Icelandic noblewoman in the 15th century, the youngest daughter of the knight Loftur Guttormsson the rich and his wife Ingibjörg Pálsdóttir. She was a full sister of Ólöf Loftsdóttir.

== Family ==
Loftur Guttormsson married off five of his children to the children of Þorleifur Árnason (the sýslumaður of Auðbrekka in Hörgárdalur, of Glaumbær in Skagafjörður, and of Vatnsfjörður (Ísafjarðardjúpi)) and his wife Vatnsfjarðar-Kristín Björnsdóttir. Ormur Loftsson and Skúli, the sons of Loftur and his mistress Kristín Oddsdóttir, married Solveig Þorleifsdóttir and Helgi Þorleifsdóttir, respectively. Ólöf Loftsdóttir married the seneschal Björn ríki Þorleifsson, Guðný Þorleifsdóttir married Eiríkur Loftsson slógnefur, and Soffía married Árni Þorleifsson in 1434. She was likely very young at the time.

Soffía and Árni had a son named Þorleifur, named after his grandfather, who was born in 1437. Árni died in 1440 and Soffía later married Bjarni Ívarsson who was the secret son of Ívar hólmur Vigfússon who Jón Gerreksson's boys burned in the Kirkjuból farm in Miðnes in 1432. They had one son who they named Ormur. Bjarni died in 1473 and Soffía probably died shortly after while Ormur was still young. Margrét Vigfúsdóttir, Bjarni's aunt and Soffía's sister-in-law (the widow of her brother Þorvarður Loftsson), took him in and became his guardian. His guardianship and the matter of Soffía's inheritance later became a dispute between Margrét and Þorleifur's sons, Árni and Teitur, who went on to be a lawyer. They wanted their uncle Ormur's funds and the inheritance from their grandmother Soffía.
