= Ludvig Wimmer =

Danish linguist and runologist

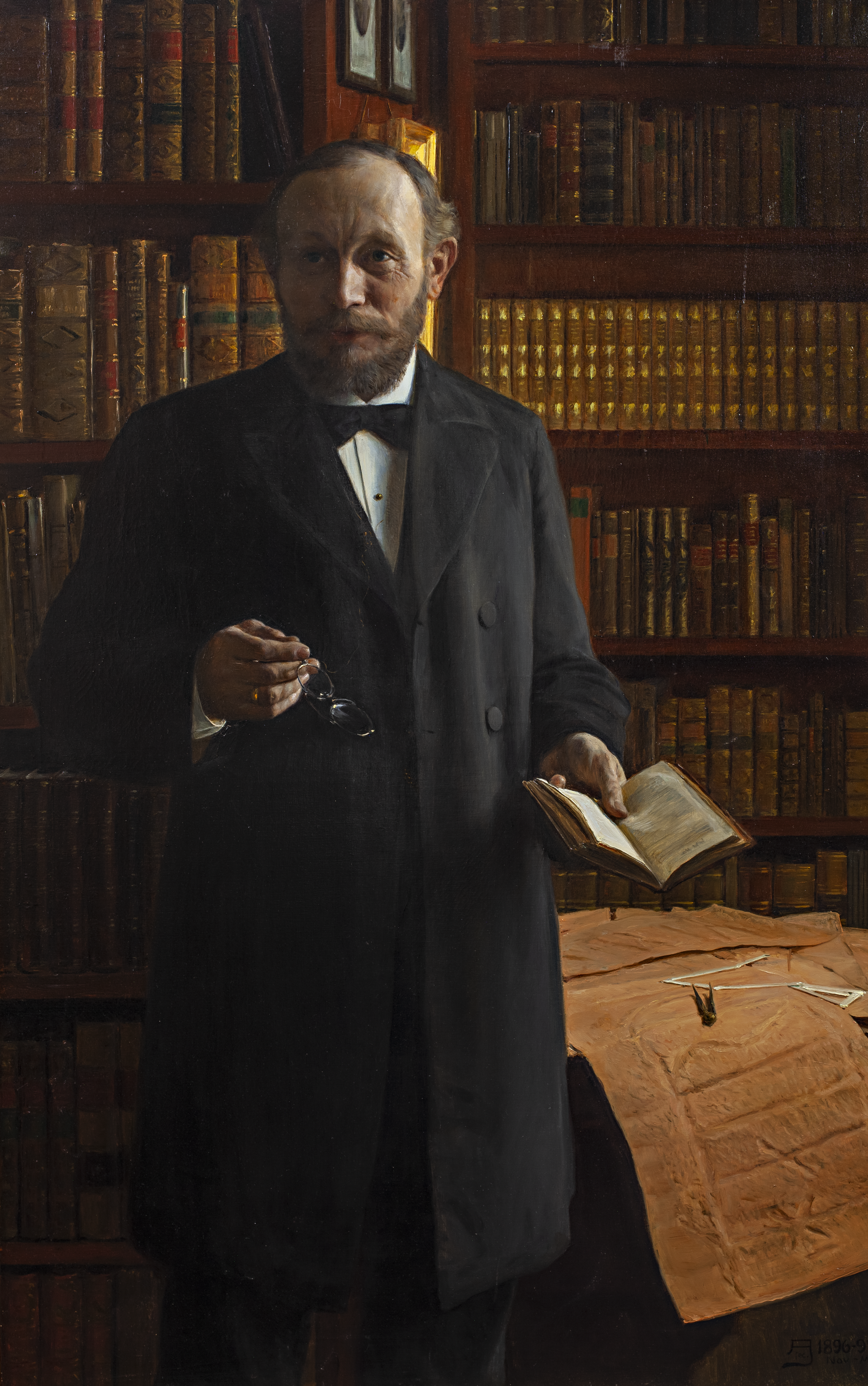
- Born: 7 February 1839; Ringkøbing
- Died: 29 April 1920 (aged 81); Copenhagen
- Resting place: Bispebjerg Cemetery
- Occupation: Linguist, philologist
- Employer: University of Copenhagen
- Awards: Dannebrogordenens Hæderstegn (1892); Medal of Merit in Gold (1905); Grand Cross of the Order of the Dannebrog (1910); honorary doctor of the Leipzig University (1909); honorary doctorate of the University of Oslo (1911)
- Position held: rector (1894–1895)

Ludvig Frands Adalbert Wimmer (7 February 1839, Ringkøbing – 29 April 1920, Copenhagen) was a Danish linguist and runologist. He was the first modern runic scholar, publishing his work Runeskriftens oprindelse og udvikling i Norden in 1874. He proved that all runic alphabets went back to one basic futhark of 24 signs, which was known and used by all the Germanic tribes.

In the introduction to the second edition of his work Oldnordisk læsebog (1877), Wimmer discussed the issue of the normalisation of Old Icelandic and suggested a standard based on the language in the Old Icelandic Homily Book (c. 1200). This standard has been very influential and is the most used standard of normalisation today.
