= Arngerðareyri =

Historic site in Iceland

Kastalinn
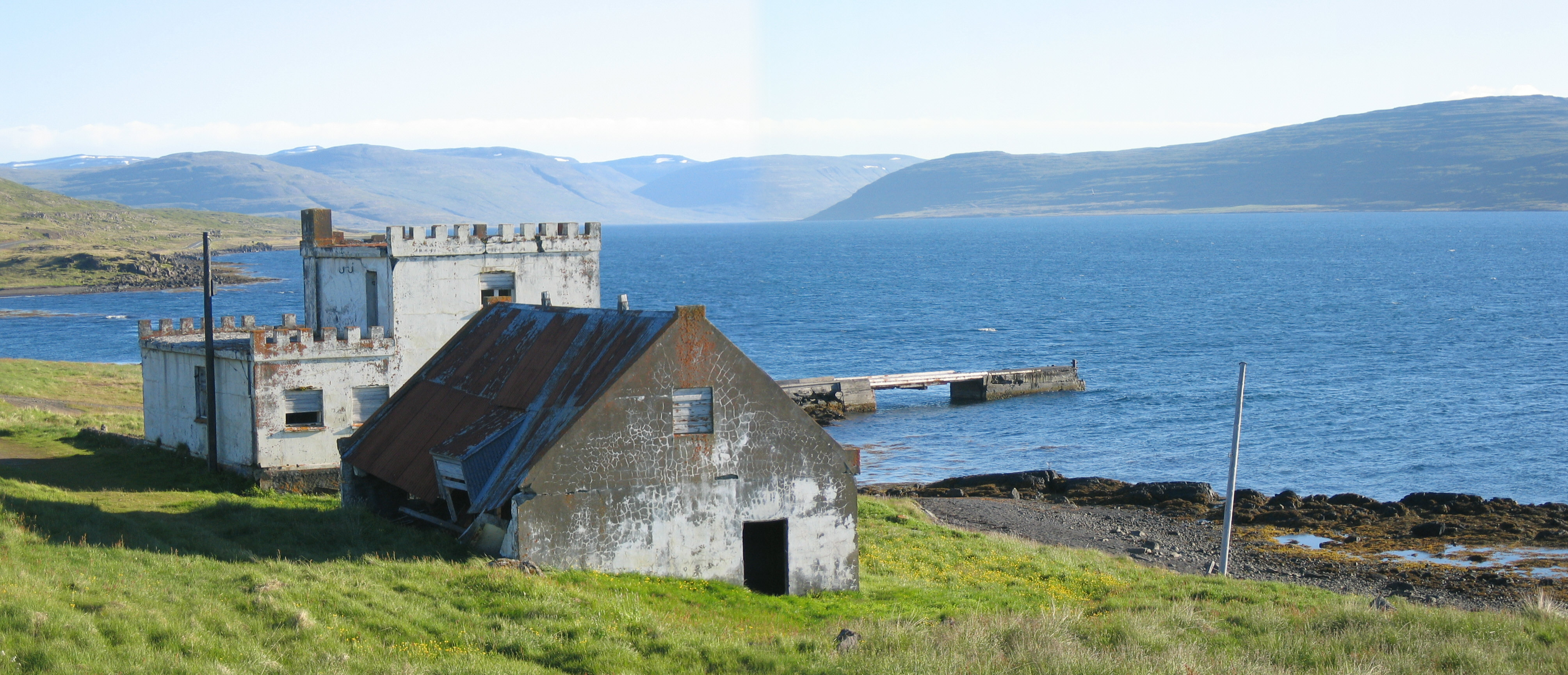
- Interactive map of the Kastalinn area

General information
- Location: Ísafjörður, Ísafjarðardjúp, Iceland
- Coordinates: 65.8868°N 22.3777°W
- Opened: 1929

Technical details
- Floor count: 3

Design and construction
- Architect: Jóhann Kristjánsson

Arngerðareyri (Icelandic pronunciation: [ˈa(r)tn̥ˌcɛrðarˌeiːrɪ]) is a location at the mouth of the fjord of Ísafjörður at the bottom of Ísafjarðardjúp in the Westfjords of Iceland and the former place of farm and trading post.

== History ==
Trading began in Arngerðareyri around 1884, owned by Ásgeirsverslun, a major merchant in Ísafjörður, and managed by Ásgeir Guðmundsson, a farmer in Arngerðareyri. During the 20th century, the ferry Fagranes sailed from Arngerðareyri to Ísafjörður while there were no or bad roads around Ísafjörður.

== Kastalinn ==
The former farm house that still stands is a stately stone house in the style of a castle, and is commonly known as Kastalinn. It was originally built for Sigurð Þórðarson, the trading company manager of the Kaupfélag Nauteyrarhrepps, in 1929. The building had six bedrooms, running water, a balcony, a water toilet, tiles decorated the floor and marble that was specially ordered from Italy for the stairs. The house was mostly abandoned in 1966, but has been slowly renovated since being acquired by new owners in 2012.
