= Borgarey =

Small island in the Westfjords region of Iceland

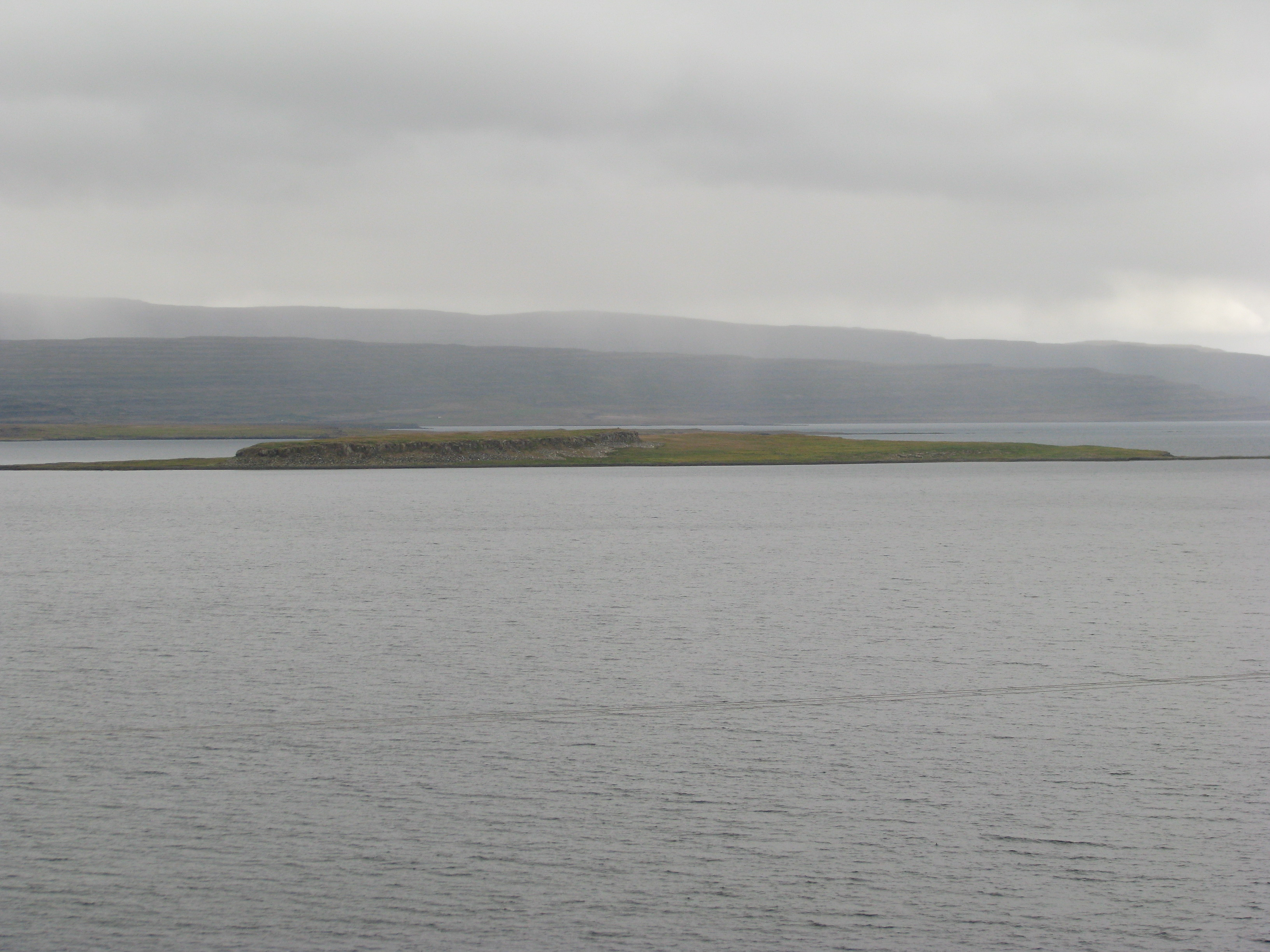

- Location within Iceland

Geography
- Location: Ísafjarðardjúp
- Coordinates: 65°58′N 22°27′W
- Area: 0.8 km^{2} (0.31 sq mi)

Administration
- Iceland
- Constituency: Northwest
- Region: Vestfirðir

Demographics
- Languages: Icelandic
- Ethnic groups: Icelanders

Additional information
- Time zone: WET (UTC+0)

Borgarey (Icelandic pronunciation: [ˈpɔrkarˌeiː]) is a small, uninhabited island in the Westfjords in the north-west of Iceland. It is the innermost and smallest island of Ísafjarðardjúp, smaller than both Æðey and Vigur. Human settlement is limited, inter alia, by the lack of fresh water. The island is the property of the church in Vatnsfjörður; thus since there is no separation of church and state, it is public property. Nobody lives on the island, but in summer the owners sail over to it and collect eiderdown.

The area is very approximately 200 acres or 80 hectares.

The -ey signifies a small island, while -Borgar is the genitive singular of Borg (cognate to Burg etc.) which originally signified a hill. (Medieval forts tended to be built on hills.)
