= Solveig Guðmundsdóttir =

15th-century Icelandic landowner

- Born: c. 1430
- Died: c. 1501
- Known for: Ongoing inheritance dispute
- Spouse: Bjarni Þórarinson the Icelander (married 1470–1481)
- Parent(s): Guðmundur Arason ríki, Helga Þorleifsdóttir
- Relatives: Andrés Guðmundsson (half-brother), Vatnsfjarðar-Kristín Björnsdóttir (grandmother), Björn Þorleifsson and Einar Þorleifsson (uncles)

Solveig Guðmundsdóttir (c. 1430–1501) was an Icelandic noblewoman in the 14th century. She was the only child of Guðmundur Arason ríki ("the rich") of Reykhólar and his wife Helga Þorleifsdóttir, the daughter of Vatnsfjarðar-Kristín Björnsdóttir. Guðmundur and Helga were the wealthiest couple in the country in their day, and Solveig should have inherited it, but she spent most of her life trying to get her inheritance from her mother's relatives.

== Upbringing ==
In 1446, Solveig's father Guðmundur was sentenced as an outlaw for dubious charges at the behest of his brothers-in-law Björn Þorleifsson and Einar Þorleifsson, who both became seneschals. He had a total of 177 properties and 6 manors where he managed large ranches, and all of his possessions were supposed to go to the king and heirs. He left the country and supposedly died shortly thereafter. His wife Helga had passed away some time ago and Solveig was likely a teenager at the time. Björn and Einar forcibly seized his assets and collected income from them, and Björn bought part of the king's share for a low price. Solveig, their niece, did not receive her share, nor did she receive her inheritance due to her from her mother.

Little is known about Solveig in the nearly two decades afterwards. She did not have powerful allies whom she trusted to go up against her relatives. Einar died in 1453 and, leaving only Björn the seneschal to contend with, the most powerful man in the country.

== Origin of the inheritance issues ==
Solveig had a younger half-brother, Andrés Guðmundsson, Guðmundur's son with another woman. In 1465, Andrés reached adulthood and became his sister's assistant along with Loftur Ormsson the Icelander, the farmer and knight of Staðarhóll in Saurbær, but Loftur's mother Solveig was the sister of Helga, Björn, and Einar. Solveig gave Loftur the authority to retrieve her possessions from Björn with Loftur getting half. He took some estates that Guðmundur had managed but he was not able to handle Björn nor his sons, Þorleifur or Einar, after the English killed Björn in Rif in 1467.

A year or two later, Solveig went to Norway—as did Loftur and Andrés—perhaps with the intention of seeking aid from the king in the dispute. However, Loftur returned home in 1470, reconciled with Þorleifur Björnsson, and stopped supporting Solveig.

== Marriage ==
Solveig stayed in Norway and, that same spring, married Bjarni Þórarinson the Icelander, who was called a "good man" but seemed to have been an aggressive bully, and he took on his wife's issues. They stayed abroad and, in 1478, finally succeeded getting an audience with King Christian I of Denmark. On November 25 that year, the king issued instructions to the seneschal Didrik Pining and the Bishop of Skálholt Magnús Eyjólfsson to divide Guðmundur Arason's possessions three ways among the king himself, Björn Þorleifsson's heirs, and Solveig and Bjarni. They returned home with this letter from the king in 1479 and did not wait for the assets to be divided, but immediately took over some of Guðmundur's properties; Bjarni may have employed violence and pillaging. Then, Þorleifur Björnsson arrested Bjarni around the new year of 1479–1480, and had him detained in Reykhólar for a time. Solveig sought aid from the lawyer Hrafn Brandsson, her relative, who reached a temporary agreement resulting in Bjarni's release.

The possessions were divided into three parts at the Alþingi in 1480 by 12 men who were named to the task, and portion to Solveig was very economically favorable, being multiple times larger than the others. Amonther other things, she received Reykhólar where she settled down more than 30 years after she had been driven from it. Björn Þorleifsson's sons were not content with the way the inheritance was divided and, in the summer, Þorleifur sailed to the king to try to get him to annul the decision. However, he made no progress there, and King Christian died the spring after and Þorleifur then went back to Norway, where he turned to the Norwegian state council, which was exercising authority for the king's regent in Norway and Iceland until the new king was crowned. He got the council to annul the decision and obtained control of the inheritance until the estate was divided again. In addition, he was made seneschal over all of Iceland for three years.

== The Death of Bjarni ==
Þorleifur, however, did not come to Iceland until 1482. While his brother Einar had gotten mixed up in a clash with Solveig's husband Bjarni, which ended such that, on December 3, 1481, Einar had gained custody of Bjarni, as he was located in Brjánslækur in Barðaströnd, and had him executed.

When Þorleifur returned home, he again settled in Reykhólar, and Solveig called upon her half-brother Andrés who was the sýslumaður in Fell in Kollafjörður. Around wintertime, Andrés settled in a fort in Reykhólar that Þorleifur had someone construct there, and Þorleifur gained control of him early in January and, as a result, they reconciled and Andrés renounced all claim to Guðmundur's property.

== Inheritance after 55 years ==
Nothing more is known about Solveig for the next 18 years, but it is likely that she stayed with her brother. There were no incidents with the inheritance issues and, afterwards, when Þorleifur and his brother Einar were both dead, Andrés took up the case again and negotiated with Björn, Þorleifur's son, and received various properties.

Solveig did not have a role in these negotiations until the 1501 Alþingi, 55 years after her father was sentenced as an outlaw, where she was awarded her mother's inheritance, but by then she had given her nephews, Guðmundur and Ari, her próventa (money given to a person or organization in exchange for care in old age) and therefore they were the ones who received the inheritance. She was then in her 70s and likely died shortly after.
