= Solveig Björnsdóttir =

Icelandic noblewoman (c. 1450–1495)

- Born: c. 1450
- Died: 1495
- Spouse: Páll Jónsson
- Partner: Jón Þorláksson
- Children: Eight, including Þorleifur Pálsson
- Parent(s): Ólöf Loftsdóttir, Björn Þorleifsson
- Relatives: Þorleifur Björnsson (brother), Árni Björnsson (brother), Einar Björnsson (brother)
- Family: Skarðverjar

Solveig Björnsdóttir (c. 1450–1495) was an Icelandic noblewoman. She was from the Skarðverjar family and was the daughter of Ólöf Loftsdóttir and the seneschal Björn Þorleifsson.

Solveig grew up with her parents in Skarð in Skagaströnd and lived for many years in Hóll in Bolungarvík with Jón Þorláksson who was appointed as her steward. They were not allowed to marry but they had six children together. Jón was a productive writer, considered the best in the western region and, allegedly, when he died, three of his fingers on his right hand—the ones he used to hold a pen—did not stiffen. The shaft of his pen was placed between his fingers and he wrote: "Gratia plena, Dominus tecum", referencing Ave Maria.

After Jón died, Solveig married the lawyer Páll Jónsson and became his second wife. They lived in Skarð and had two sons, one of whom died young. They were third cousins and needed papal approval to be able to wed. However, the bishop of Skalholt Magnús Eyjólfsson did not want to acknowledge their marriage as valid and, after Solveig died in 1495 and Páll was killed the next year, many disputes began about whether their sons should be considered legitimate heirs. These disputes about inheritance rights had come up before; the children of Solveig's brother Þorleifur and his wife, who were also third cousins, and had gotten papal approval for their marriage. Ultimately, Solveig and Þáll's son, Þorleifur Pálsson, inherited the assets from Skarð.
