= Skutulsfjörður =

Fjord in Iceland

Coordinates: 66°04′45″N 23°06′10″W

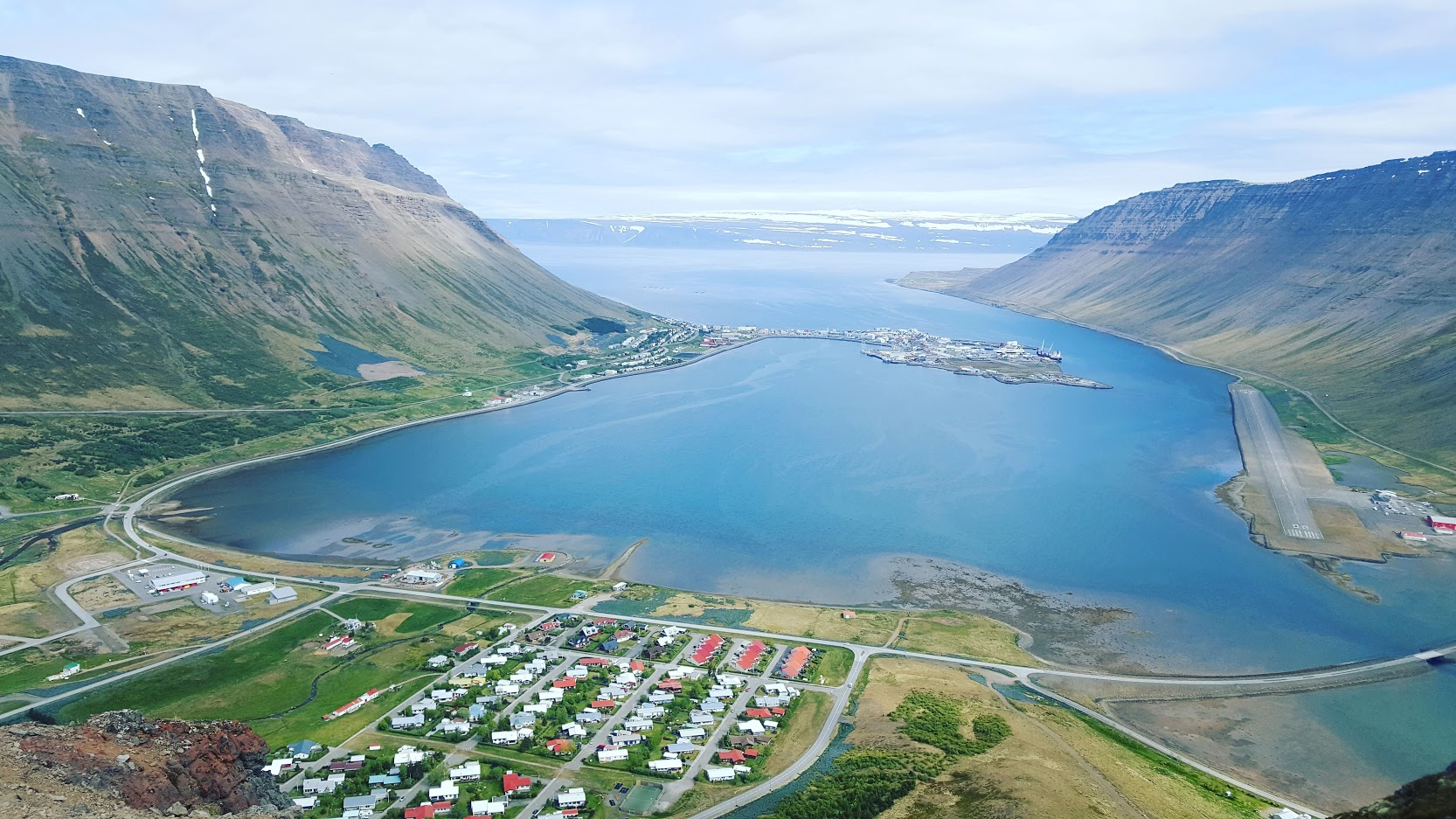
View of Skutulsfjörður from the top of Kubbi

Skutulsfjörður is the westernmost fjord branching off the major Icelandic fjord of Ísafjarðardjúp. The town of Ísafjörður is located in the fjord. Two main valleys enter from Skutulsfjörður, Engidalur and Tungudalur, separated by the mountain Kubbi. On the far north side of Engidalur is the Ísafjörður cemetery. The river Langá flows through Engidalur. In Tungudalur, the town's golf course and ski area. There is a golf course and ski area in Tungudal, but from it the Vestfjarðagöng tunnel is dug across to Botnsdalur in Súgandafjörður and Breiðdalur in Önundarfjörður. Dagverðardalur or Dögurðardalur, as it was named in Gísla saga, runs up from Tungudal, but from there the main road used to run south across Breiðadalur and Botnsheiði. Furthermore, Seljalandsdalur lies up from Skutulsfjörður, but it used to be the main ski area of Ísfjörður.

The mountain located above the main part of the town is called Hlíðarfjall. About 4/5 up there is a shelf called Gleiðarhjalli. The mountain opposite the town is called Ernir. On Ernir, there are two massive depressions, often called "troll seats", named Naustahvilft and Kirkjubólshvilft, with the former being a popular hiking trail.

In 1994, an avalanche fell in the fjord and destroyed the ski area located in Seljalandsdalur and the summer houses in Tungudalur.

In ancient writings, the fjord was called Skutilsfjörður. According to a Landnáma, Helgi Hrólfsson, Helgi magri's cousin in Akureyri, gave the fjord its name.

== Photos ==
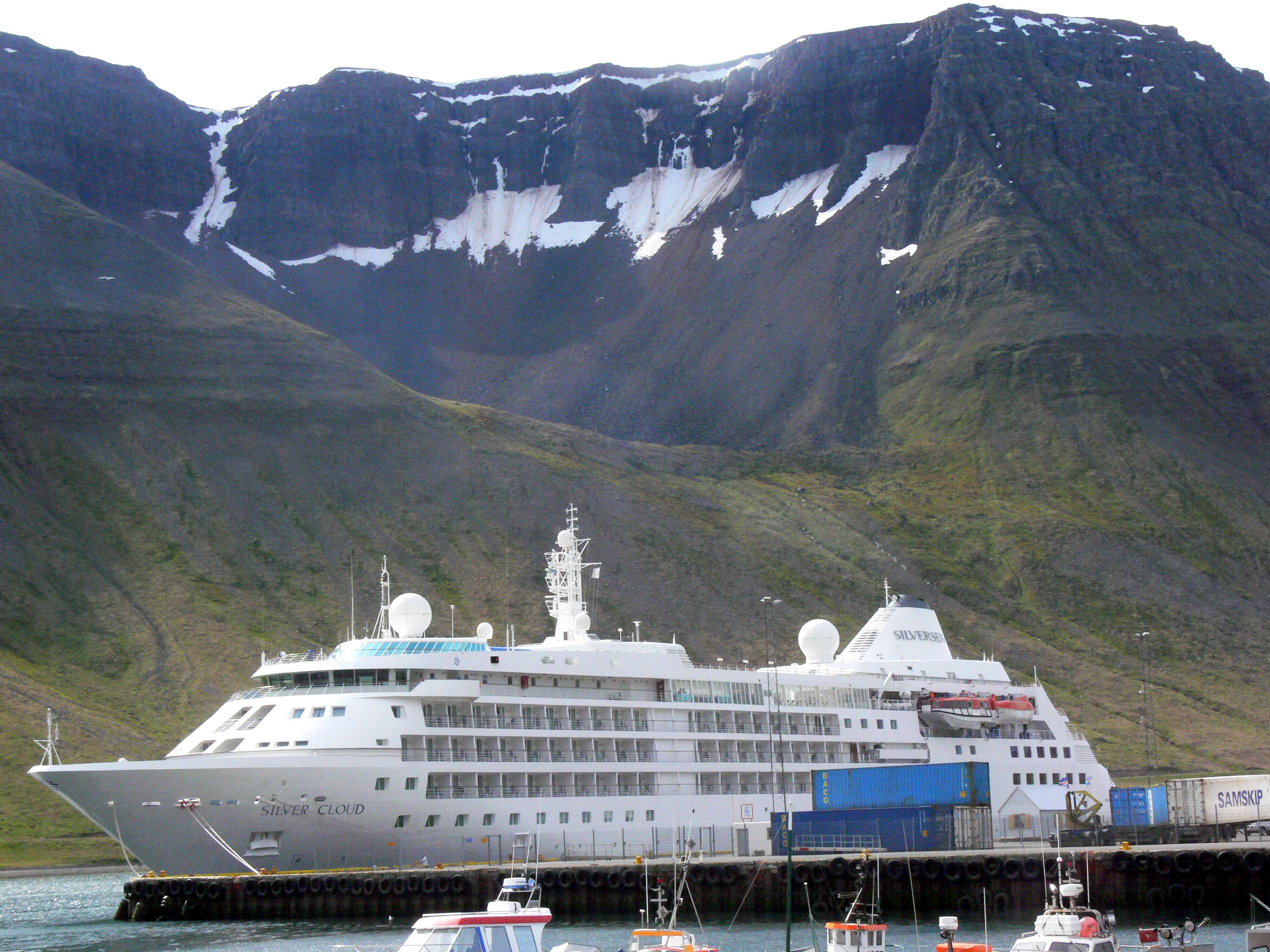

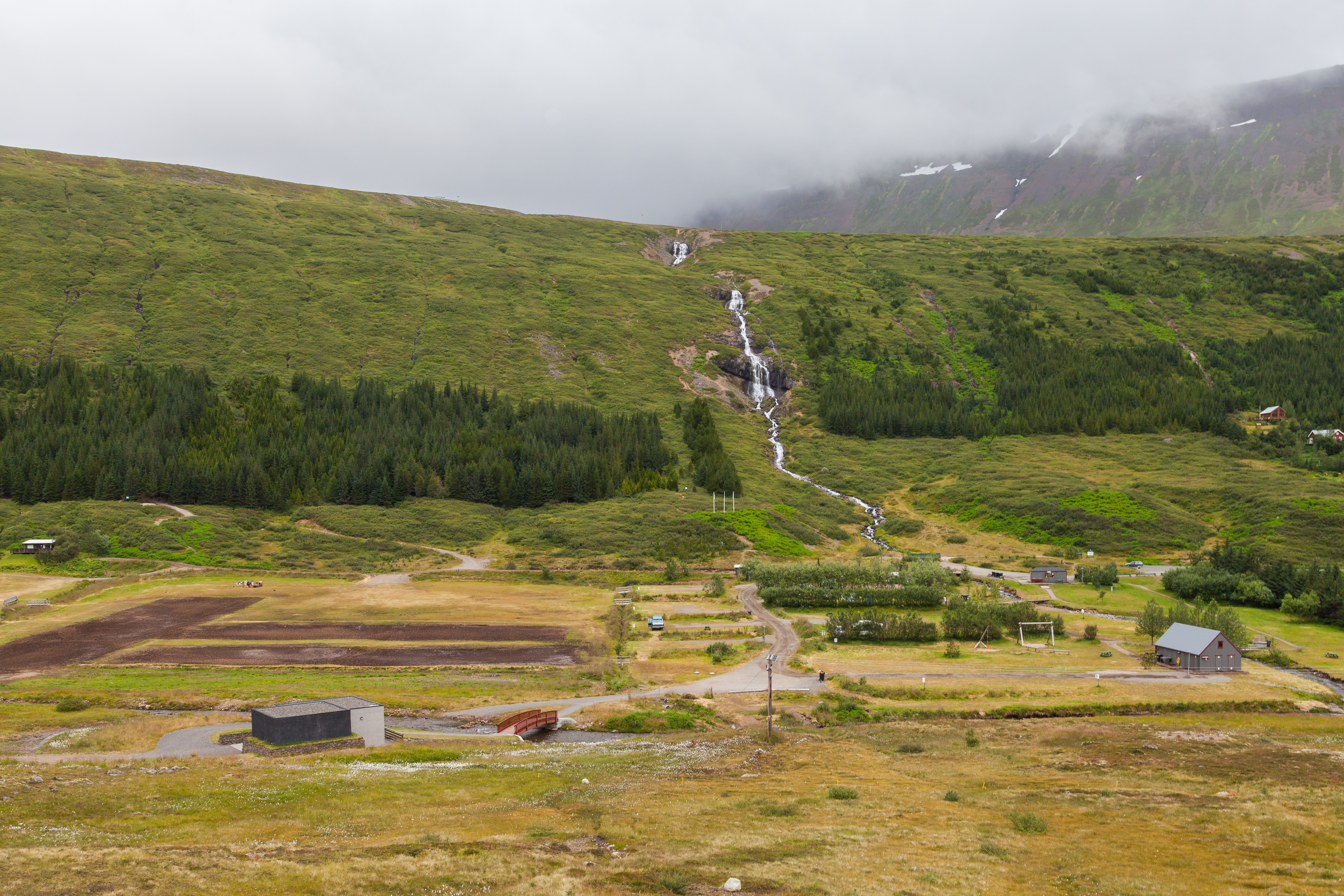

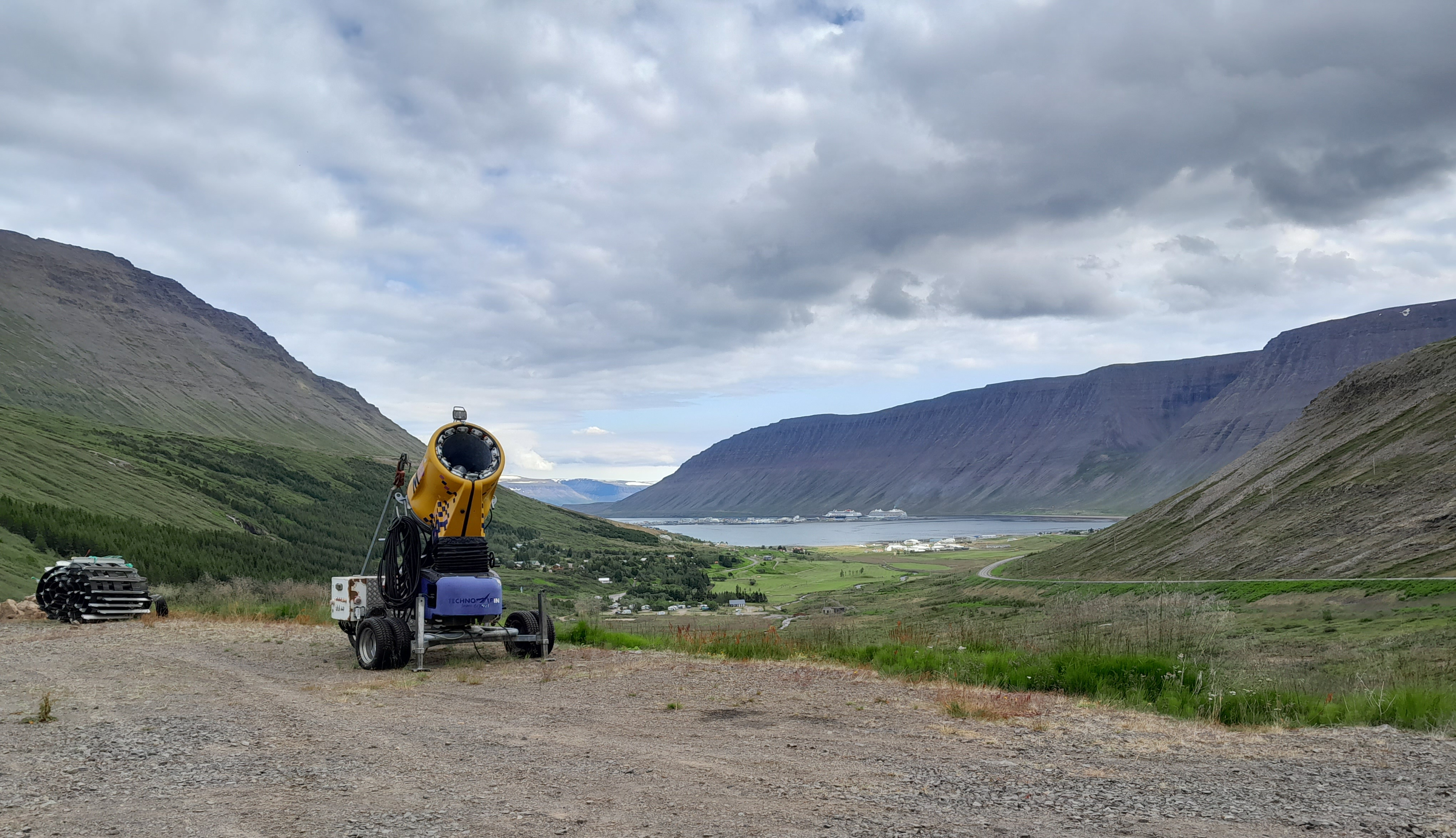

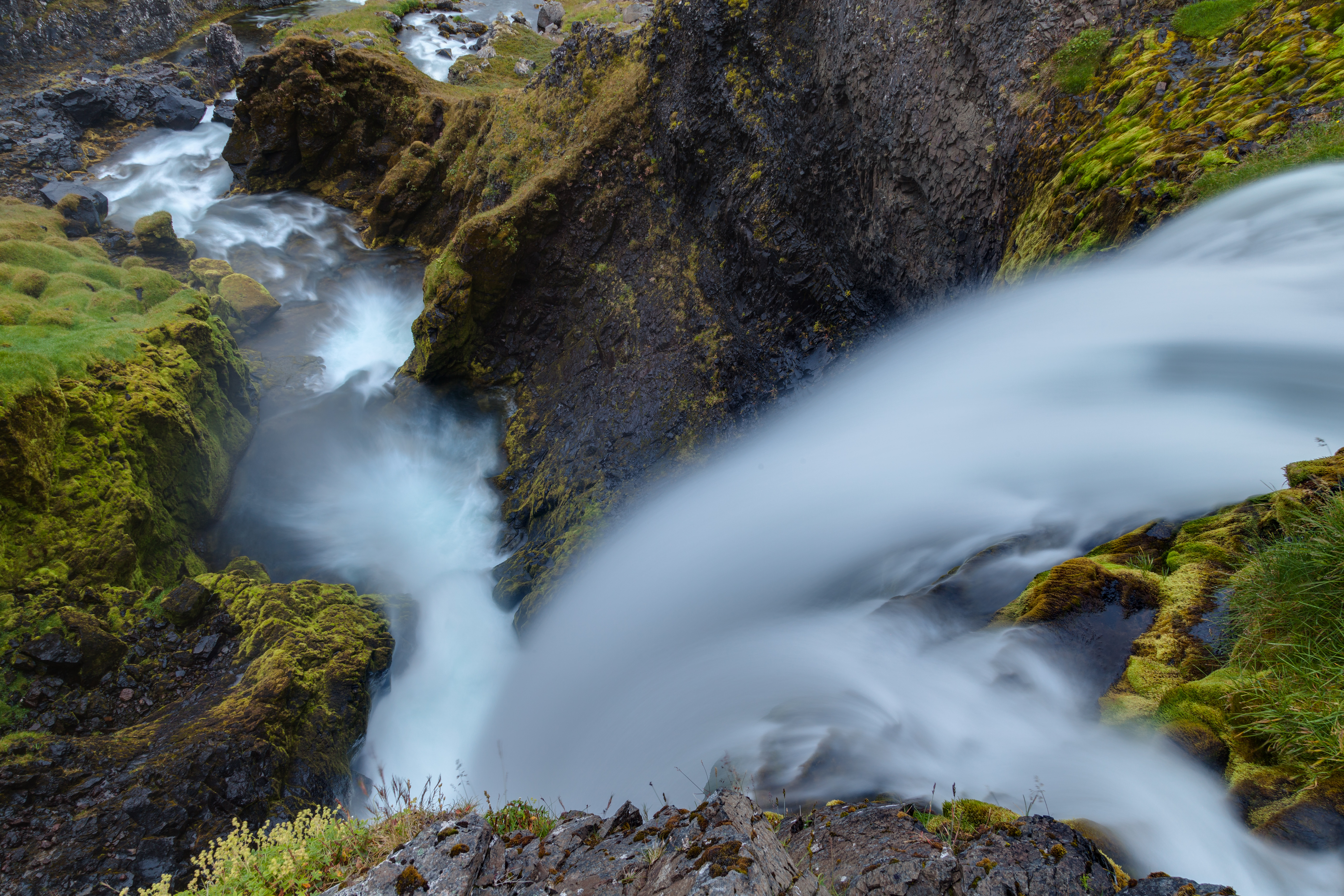

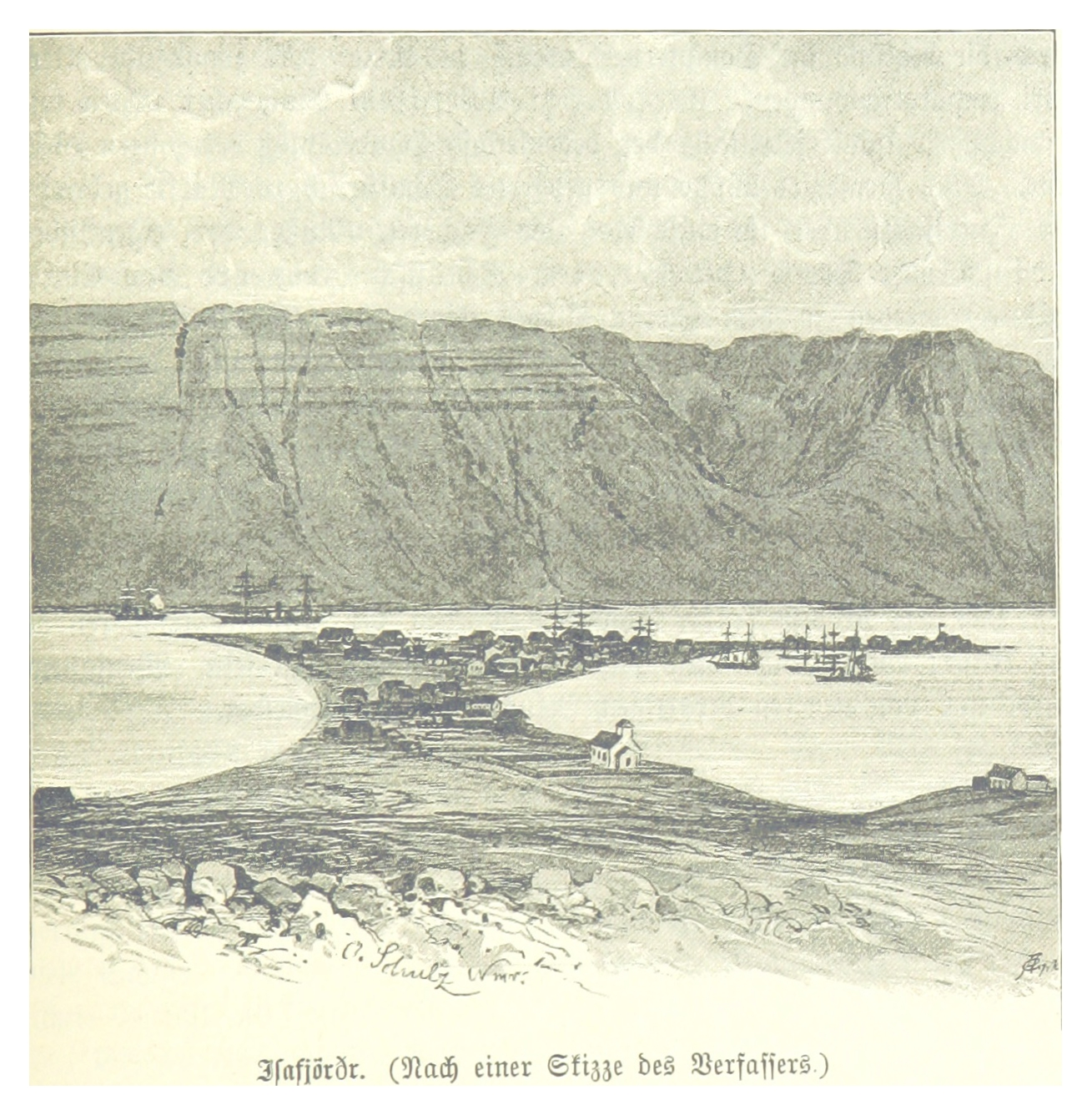
