= Hjaðningavíg =

Germanic heroic legend

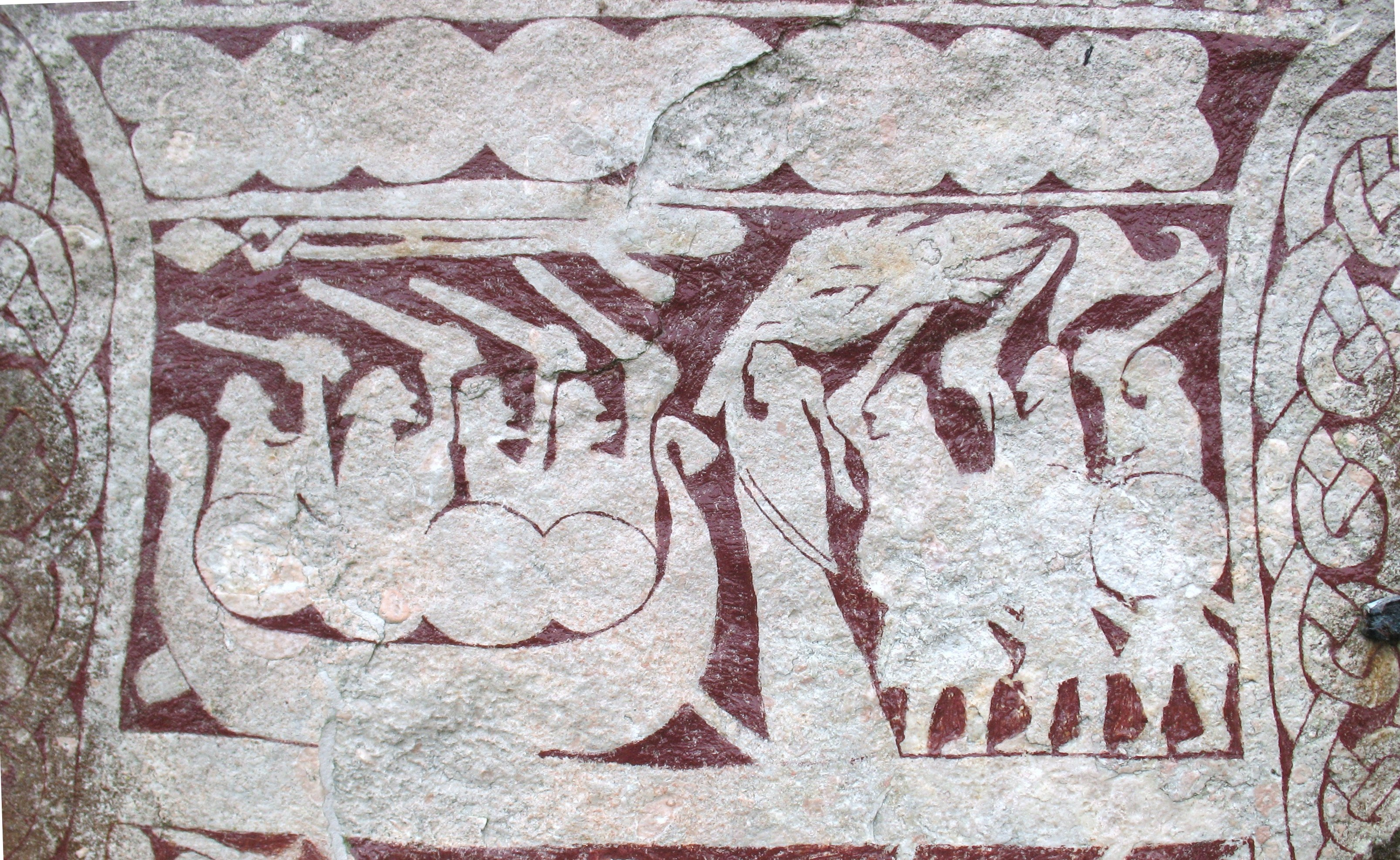
A detail from the Stora Hammars I stone, an image stone on Gotland

Hjaðningavíg (the 'battle of the Heodenings'), the legend of Heðinn and Hǫgni or the Saga of Hild is a Germanic heroic legend about a never-ending battle which is documented in Sörla þáttr, Ragnarsdrápa, Gesta Danorum, Skíðaríma and in Skáldskaparmál. It is also held to appear on the image stone at Stora Hammar on Gotland (see illustration). Moreover, it is alluded to in the Old English poems Deor and Widsið, and in the Old Norse Háttalykill inn forni, and a version of it survived down to the 18th century in the traditional Norn language ballad "Hildina". An altered version of the saga is found in the Middle High German poem Kudrun, as a prologue to the story of Kudrun herself. Yet another version is found in the Old Yiddish Dukus Horant.

Like the names Heðinn (O.E. Heoden) and Hǫgni (O.E. Hagena), the legend is believed to have continental Germanic origins.

== Edda and Ragnarsdrápa ==
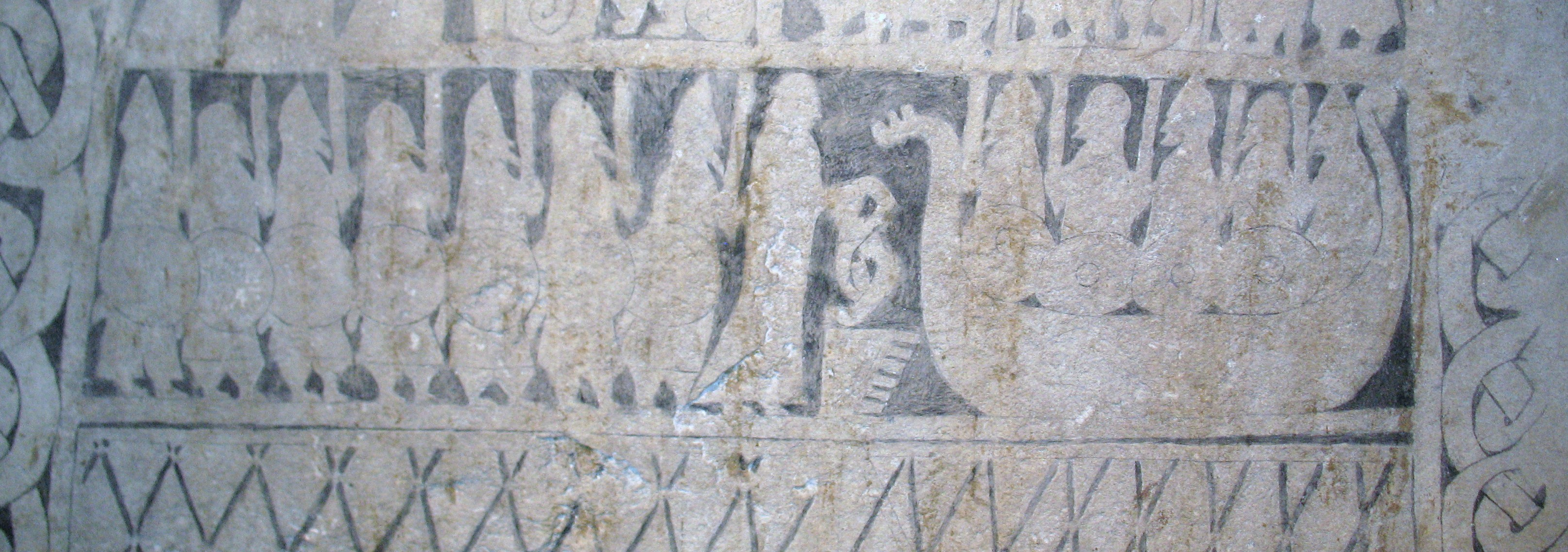
A detail from the Smiss (I) stone, an image stone on Gotland

In the Skáldskaparmál and in Ragnarsdrápa, it is related that once when Hǫgni was away, his daughter Hildr was kidnapped by a prince named Heðinn, the son of Hjarrandi (O.E. Heorrenda). When Hǫgni came back, he immediately started to search for her. In the older poem Ragnarsdrápa, Hǫgni finally found her and the island where Heðinn waited with his army. This island is explained as the island of Hoy in Orkney by Snorri Sturluson in Skáldskaparmál.

Hildr welcomed her father and offered him peace and a necklace on behalf of Heðinn. However, Hǫgni had already unsheathed his sword Dáinsleif, which gave wounds that never healed and like Tyrfing always killed a man once it had been unsheathed. A battle ensued and they fought all day and many died. In the evening Heðinn and Hǫgni returned to their camps, but Hildr stayed on the battle-field. She resurrected them with incantations and the fallen soldiers started to fight anew, and this went on until Ragnarök.

== Sörla þáttr ==
Sörla þáttr is a short story in Flateyjarbok, a collection of tales about Norwegian kings written by two Christian priests in the 15th century, owned by a family from Flatey island. Sörla þáttr is about King Olaf I of Norway (Olaf Tryggvason), who was the first to encourage Christianity in Norway and Iceland.

The story borrowed parts of Heimskringla, parts of the poem Lokasenna (of Gefjon sleeping with a boy for a necklace), parts of the Húsdrápa poem (of Loki stealing Brisingamen), and the eternal battle Hjaðningavíg. In the end of the story, the arrival of Christianity dissolves the old curse that traditionally was to endure until Ragnarök.

== Skíðaríma ==
In Skíðaríma, the war threatens to destroy Valhalla itself, and so Odin sends Thor to fetch Skíði, a pathetic beggar, so that he can stop the war. Skíði manages to stop the fight by asking to marry Hildr and she consents.

== Gesta Danorum ==
Saxo Grammaticus relates that Hithinus was the prince of a Norwegian tribe and a small man. Hithinus fell in love with Hilda, the daughter of Höginus, a strongly built Jutish chieftain. Hithinus and Hilda had in fact been so impressed with each other's reputation that they had fallen in love before meeting.

In spring, Hithinus and Höginus went pillaging together, and Höginus betrothed his daughter to Hithinus promising each other that they would avenge one another if anything happened.

However, evil tongues spread the rumour that Hithinus had touched Hilda before the betrothal. Höginus believed the false rumour and attacked Hithinus, but Höginus was beaten and returned to Jutland.

King Frotho of Denmark tried to mediate, but had to decide that the matter be settled in a holmgang. During the combat Hithinus was seriously wounded, and started losing blood. Höginus decided to have mercy on Hithinus, because among the old Scandinavians it was considered shameful to kill someone who was weaker, and so Hithinus was taken home by his men.

For of old it was accounted shameful to deprive of his life one who was ungrown or a weakling; so closely did the antique bravery of champions take heed of all that could incline them to modesty. So Hedin, with the help of his men, was taken back to his ship, saved by the kindness of his foe.

After seven years, the two men started to fight again but both died from their wounds. But, Hilda loved both so much, so that she used spells to conjure up the dead each night, and so the battle went on and on.

== Deor ==
The battle is alluded to in the Old English 10th century poem Deor. The poet explains that he served the Heodenings (people of Heðinn) until Heorrenda a more skilled poet replaced him:

Þæt ic bi me sylfum secgan wille, þæt ic hwile wæs Heodeninga scop, dryhtne dyre. Me wæs Deor noma. Ahte ic fela wintra folgað tilne, holdne hlaford, oþþæt Heorrenda nu, leoðcræftig monn, londryht geþah, þæt me eorla hleo ær gesealde. Þæs ofereode, þisses swa mæg.	I wish to say this about myself: That for a time I was the Heodenings' poet, dear to my lord – my name was "Deor". For many years I had a profitable position, a loyal lord until now that Heorrenda, the man skilled in song, has received the estate which the warriors' guardian had given to me. That went by, so can this.

The Heodenings and Heorrenda are probably mentioned in Deor to add a level of irony or humour. Being eternal, the tragedy of the Heodenings would not "go by".

== Anglo-Latin ==
Text and illustration from Bodley 614

An Anglo-Latin version of the legend, anonymized, Christianized and generally reduced to a folktale, is found in the manuscript Oxford, Bodleian Library, Bodley 614, at folio 49v, appended to a copy of De rebus in Oriente mirabilibus:

In Asia quoque duo germani fratres esse referuntur qui ob iuges lites et dissensiones inter se motas ab utroque parente maledicti se ipsos iugiter pugnando afficiunt. quibus forte uulneratis puella quedam soror eorum aquam de proximo quodam fonte hauriens plagis illorum infundit et sanantur. Ab hora uero nona sabbati quiescunt atque ut fratres se amplectuntur et sic in pace morantur, iurantes ad inuicem ulterius nil mali se moturos. Sed prima hora secunde ferie arma resumentes in se omnibus misera fata portendunt, sorore eorum illis pugnantibus flente.
In Asia also there are said to be two brothers who, having been cursed by both their parents because of the constant quarrels and disagreements that they carried on with each other, perpetually go on fighting. When they chance to be wounded, a girl, a sister of theirs, draws water from a neighbouring spring, pours it on their wounds, and they are healed. From the ninth hour of Saturday they rest, embrace each other as brothers, and remain at peace, swearing that they will never again hurt one another; but at the first hour of Monday they take up arms again and threaten each other with all manner of evil, while their sister weeps at their fighting.

== Sources ==
- Online publication of Gesta Danorum
- Henrikson, Alf: Stora mytologiska uppslagsboken.
- A translation of Sörla þáttr in English
- A translation of the legend from Skáldskaparmál
