= Björn Einarsson (bandy) =

Swedish bandy player

Björn Einarsson (born 19 June 1978) is a Swedish bandy player who currently plays for Vetlanda BK as forward. Björn has scored over 100 goals in the Allsvenskan.

Björn has only played for two clubs:

Clubs	Years
Vetlanda BK	1994–1997
Hammarby IF Bandy	1997–2002
Vetlanda BK	2002–
