= Ásgeirsverslun =

Icelandic fishing company

- Company type: Merchant, fishing and shipping company
- Founded: 1852 in Ísafjörður, Iceland
- Founder: Ásgeir Ásgeirsson
- Defunct: 30 November 1918
- Headquarters: Ísafjörður, Iceland

Ásgeirsverslun (Icelandic pronunciation: [ˈausˌceir̥sˌvɛ(r̥)stlʏn], lit. 'Ásgeir's store') was a major merchant and fishing company located in Ísafjörður in Iceland. The company was the largest trading company in Iceland at the time, operating several large fishing vessels and branches for trade and fish reception in many parts of Westfjords. The company is named after a father and son, both named Ásgeir. Árni Jónsson factor was the manager from 1877 to 1910.

== History ==
In 1889, the company had the first telephone line laid in Iceland, and it reached from the Faktorshús in Neðstikaupstaður up to their store located at Aðalstræti 15 in Ísafjörður. Three years later, another telephone line was laid between the towns of Ísafjörður and Hnífsdalur.

In 1894, Ásgeirverslun bought the first transatlantic ship owned by Icelanders and named it Ásgeir Ásgeirsson. The ship sailed between Ísafjörður and Europe. It exported salted fish to Spain and returned with products from Copenhagen.

In 1912, Ásgeir Jr. died suddenly in Copenhagen, and in 1915 his mother, Sigríður, died. Despite the company's success, their heirs decided at a meeting in March 1918 to shut down the company and sell all its assets. In the end, the Hinar sameinuðu íslensku verslanir bought most of the properties and Ásgeirsverslun officially ceased operations on 30 November 1918.
