= Ólöf Loftsdóttir =

Icelandic noblewoman (1410–1479)

- Ólöf Ríka
- Born: c. 1410
- Died: 1479
- Spouse: Björn Þorleifsson
- Children: Þorleifur Björnsson, Árni Björnsson, Einar Björnsson, Solveig Björnsdóttir
- Parent(s): Loftur Guttormsson, Ingibjörg Pálsdóttir
- Relatives: Soffía Loftsdóttir (sister), Eiríkur Loftsson slógnefur (brother), Ormur Loftsson (half-brother), Skúli Loftsson (half-brother)

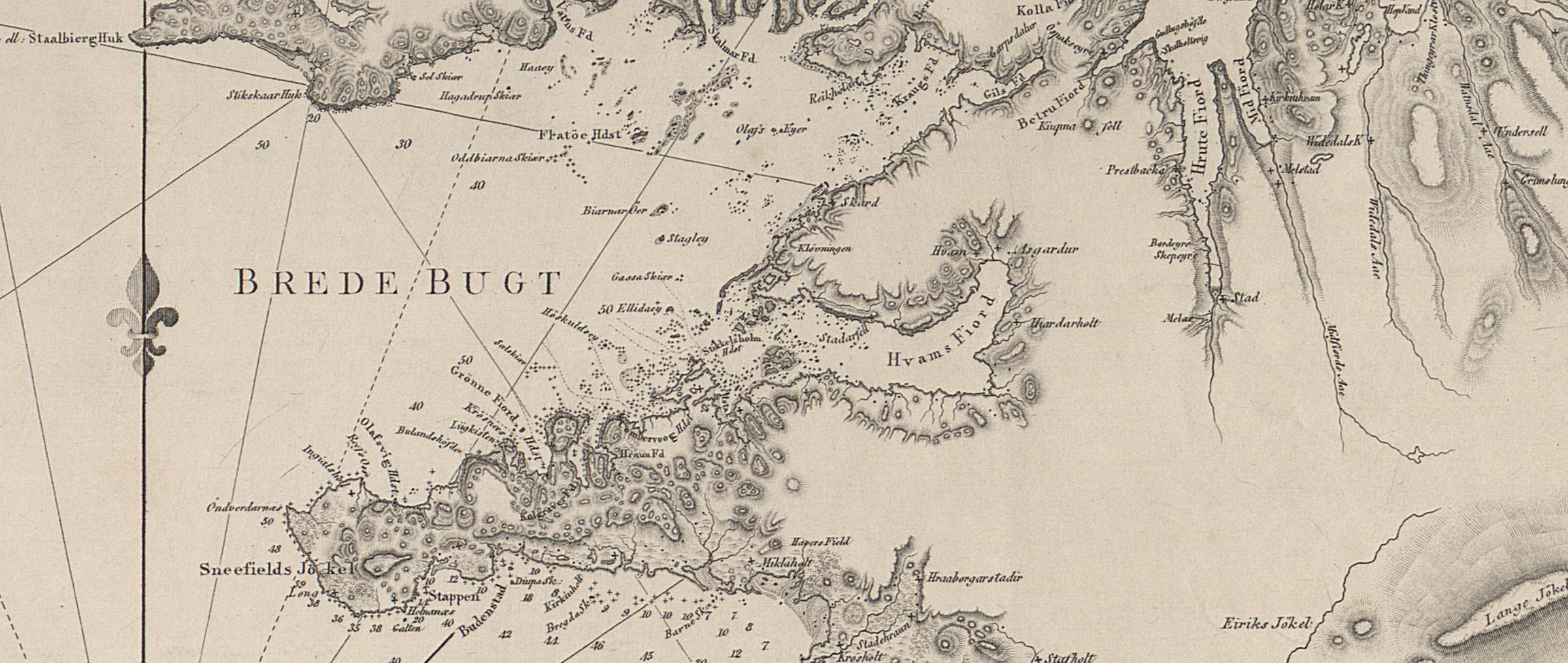
Location of Skarð

Ólöf ríka ("the rich") Loftsdóttir (c. 1410–1479) was an Icelandic noblewoman. She was the daughter of Loftur ríki Guttormsson and Ingibjörg Pálsdóttir and married to Björn Þorleifsson hirðstjóri. She resided at Skarð in Skarðsströnd and is most known for her role in combating the English who came to Iceland.

== Family ==
Ólöf was from the Skarðverjar family and lived in Skarð in Skarðsströnd. Her parents, Loftur ríki ("the rich") Guttormsson and his wife Ingibjörg Pálsdóttir, pampered her throughout her upbringing.

Ólöf married Björn Þorleifsson, the son of the Vatnsfjörður sýslumaður Þorleifur Árnason and his wife Vatnsfjarðar-Kristín Björnsdóttir. They lived in Skarð and were the richest couple in Iceland with many properties and a lot of liquid funds. Their wealth included a large number of copper pots and other household objects that they rented out, which yielded a good income.

Some sources say that Ólöf had had two children in wedlock as well as one out of wedlock with Sigvaldur langalíf "the long-lived" Gunnarson, but these claims are unfounded. Ólöf and Björn's children were:

- Þorleifur Björnsson, seneschal of Reykjólar
- Árni Björnsson who allegedly fell in battle against Christian I
- Einar Björnsson, a young man in Skarð who also died abroad
- Solveig Björnsdóttir of Skarð, who had a lot of children with her first husband Jón Þorláksson, but later married Páll Jónsson, the sýslumaður of Skarð.

== Kidnapping ==
In 1455, the couple was robbed and abducted by Scottish pirates outside Orkney and imprisoned in Scotland. They were released by a ransom paid by the Danish monarch King Christian I and Björn was then made seneschal (hirðstjóri) overseeing all of Iceland with the task of hindering English trade in Iceland. When Ólöf and Björn returned home, the couple issued a feud with the British traders working in Iceland, taking their men around the country, driving off the English, and confiscating their funds. In 1467, there was a battle between Björn and his men against the English in Rif, Snæfellsnes where the English had a market, which ended with Björn and some of his men being killed and his son being taken captive. Ólöf is alleged to have said "we should not mourn Björn the farmer, we should gather the troops".

Ólöf bought Þorleifur's freedom and then, with the help of her son, began to wage war on the English who had come to their country. She allegedly took many Englishmen captive and bound and transported them to her home in Skarð where she put them to work doing hard labor, building walls in particular, before she beheaded all 50 of them.

Ólöf died in 1479. She reportedly had asked god to make her death memorable. When she died, a big hurricane broke and it was named Ólafarbylur (Ólaf's storm).

== See also ==
- List of kidnappings before 1900
- Lists of solved missing person cases
