= Old Icelandic Homily Book =

The Old Icelandic Homily Book (Stock. Perg. 4to no. 15), also known as the Stockholm Homily Book, is one of two main collections of Old West Norse sermons; the other being the Old Norwegian Homily Book (AM 619 4to), with which it shares eleven texts. Written in around 1200, and both based on earlier exemplars, together they represent some of the oldest examples of Old West Norse prose.

The Old Icelandic Homily Book (OIHB) contains 62 texts and parts of texts, 50 of which are homilies. For this reason it is better considered a homiletic hand-book rather than a homiliary. Further, the ‘homilies’ it contains, as with most Old Norse homilies, conform more closely to the definition of sermons. The other texts are wide-ranging and include excerpts from Stephanus saga, a translation of part of pseudo-Ambrose’s Acta Sancti Sebastiani, and a fragment of a text dealing with musical theory, amongst others.

== History ==
Nothing of the history of the OIHB is known for certain until 1682 when it was bought by Jón Eggertsson for the Swedish College of Antiquities. In 1789, it was moved, along with the other manuscripts of the college, to the Royal Library of Sweden.

The manuscript has been variously dated between the end of the 12th century and the middle of the 13th century, but it is now generally accepted that it was written ‘around 1200’. Both the handwriting and orthography confirm that the manuscript was written in Iceland.

== Description of the manuscript ==
The manuscript is written on 102 leaves of parchment, bound in a sealskin cover, which folds over in a flap at the front. Both the front cover and the flap have a number of signs carved into them, most of which can be identified as runes. The back cover has three signs which appear to be in Gothic script.

The text is predominantly in Carolingian minuscule script with insular thorn and wynn, written in brown ink. There are a number of headings in red ink and occasionally the first word of a sermon has been filled in with red ink. There are numerous marginal entries; some contemporary with the manuscript and others dating from the 16th – 19th centuries.

There are a number of very early alterations to the manuscript which appear to date from a controversy between Theodor Wisén, the text's first editor, and Ludvig Larsson, who published a study which contained nearly 2000 corrections of Wisén’s edition. Lindblad (1975) concluded that in almost 1200 instances Larsson’s readings were correct and in around 150 cases, his readings were incorrect. But in the majority of the instances where Larsson’s readings seem to be incorrect, there have been alterations to the text: identified as very young by the “shape of additions, ink and the quality of pen used”.

Page 77v has three drawings: two lions engraved by dry-point and an ink drawing of a man pointing with his hand. The clearest lion is of Romanesque-type and has been dated to the first part of the 13th century.

There has been much debate concerning the number of hands involved in the writing of the manuscript, with opinions ranging from 1 to 14. The two most recent studies quoted by de Leeuw van Weenen, Rode (1974) and Westlund (1974) place the number of hands at 14 and 12 respectively. De Leeuw van Weenen states that she is drawn to there being only one hand involved. Stefán Karlsson similarly holds this view.

== Contents ==
The OIHB is principally distinct from the Old Norwegian Homily Book (ONHB) in that unlike the latter it is not arranged according to the church year. The source material for the OIHB has been traced to a number of the Church Fathers, though a full study of the sources has yet to be carried out. However, the OIHB also made use of material available in other homiliaries. For example, it contains a close translation of a sermon included in the “Pembroke-type homilary”: a Carolingian preacher’s anthology.

The style of the OIHB is closer to that of the Íslendingasögur than the Latinate vocabulary and syntax of later Old West Norse religious prose. It makes use of abrupt changes in tense and from indirect to direct speech, particularly in paraphrases of the gospels. It occasionally uses “native proverbs and everyday similitudes” which contribute to its simple, practical style. However, rhetorical devices are sometimes used to achieve a high style and some sentences can be scanned as verse.

Of the 11 sermons in the OIHB and ONHB have in common, two are found in what is possibly the oldest Icelandic manuscript fragment, AM 237a fol: dated to 1150. These texts are the ‘Stave-church Homily’ and a sermon for St. Michael’s Day. Indrebø has shown that the 11 sermons in common are copies of copies, at least. Similarly, he concluded that AM 237a fol is a copy of a copy, and was itself probably a remnant of a homiliary itself. This implies that at least some material in the manuscript belongs to before 1150.

As well as sermons found in the ONHB and AM 237a fol, some sermons feature in other Old Norse manuscripts such as Hauksbók.

== See also ==
- Old Norwegian Homily Book
