= Flatey =

Flatey may refer to either of two islands in Iceland:

- Flatey, Breiðafjörður
- Flatey, Skjálfandi

== See also ==
- Flateyjarbók, one of the most important medieval Icelandic manuscripts
