= Björn Einarsson Jórsalafari =

14-century Icelandic trader and government agent

Björn (or Bjørn) Einarsson (c. 1350 – 1415), called Jórsalfari (Jerusalem-farer), was a traveller, trader, pilgrim and government agent from Iceland.

== Family ==
Björn was a native of Hvalfjörður. He lived at his estate at Vatnsfjord. His wife's name was Solveig. Jón lærði Guðmundsson records that the author of the Skaufalabálkur and Skíðaríma was Björn's poet, Einar fóstri. This identification is a result of confusion between Björn and his grandson and namesake, Björn Þorleifsson. Skaufalabálkur was written by a poet in the service of the latter, although Einar fóstri may still be the author of Skíðaríma.

== Greenland travels ==
In 1384 or 1385, Björn led a fleet of four ships that was driven off course by a storm while on the way from Norway to Iceland. He spent the next two winters in Greenland (1385–1387). The Greenlanders made him a tax collector (syslu) in Eiriksfjord, where he received 260 cured legs of mutton. The other crews probably received taxes in kind at other fjords. They seemingly ate the meat themselves.

In the summer of 1386 or 1387, Björn returned to Hvalfjord. In the summer of 1388, he sailed to Bergen and sold the goods from Greenland. He wintered in Bergen in 1388–1389. In May 1389 he and his crews were prosecuted by the syslemann of Bergen on three charges: that there trip to Greenland was planned; that they lacked royal permission to trade in Greenland; and that they had bought the crown's goods without permission. The legal basis of the first charge is not clear, but the court accepted that they had not intended to go to Greenland to trade. The second charge was probably based on an ordinance forbidding trade outside of towns. The crew produced witnesses who testified that the thing of Gardar had passed a resolution forbidding foreigners to buy food without also buying other products. On the third charge, Bjorn testified that his offer to bring the legs of mutton to Bergen had been refused by the local ombudsmann. The judges acquitted them all charges. A report on the case was sent to Queen Margaret I.

Björn's travels to Greenland are known through his Reisubók (travel book), a diary that is now lost. It is preserved only in excerpts quoted by Björn Jónsson á Skarðsá (1574–1655) in his Grænlands annal. The Byskupsannálar, written in the early 17th century by Síra Jón Egilsson, corroborates certain details from the Reisubók. The Reisubók contains valuable information beyond Björn's travels. According to the Reisubók, an old priest was administering the diocese of Gardar in 1385 since the death of the bishop in 1378.

== Later travels ==
Björn made more extensive travels later in life, but they are not recorded in his Reisubók. In 1405, he made out his will and went on a pilgrimage to Santiago de Compostela for the sake of his soul. According to the Lögmannsannáll, which describes him as a bóndi (wealthy farmer), he was laid up sick in Santiago for a month in 1406. He returned to Iceland through France and England. He made a pilgrim's stop in Canterbury. Between 1405 and 1411, Björn made three pilgrimages to Rome and four to Jerusalem, whence the nickname Jórsalfari.

Björn died in 1415.

== Bibliography ==
- Amory, Frederic (1975). "Skaufalabalkur, its Author, and its Sources". Scandinavian Studies. 47 (3): 293–310. JSTOR 40917527.
- Barreiro, Santiago (2020). "Pilgrims from the Land of Sagas: Jacobean Devotion in Medieval Iceland" (PDF). Journal of Medieval Iberian Studies. 12 (1): 1–15. doi:10.1080/17546559.2019.1705373.
- Nedkvitne, Arnved (2019). Norse Greenland: Viking Peasants in the Arctic. Routledge.
- Seaver, Kirsten A. (1996). The Frozen Echo: Greenland and the Exploration of North America, ca. A.D 1000–1500. Stanford University Press.
- Þorgeirsson, Haukur; Sayers, William (2023). "The Fox as a Dying Hero: An Edition and Translation of the Late Medieval Icelandic Poem Skaufalabálkur". Scandinavian-Canadian Studies. 30: 1–19. doi:10.29173/scancan239.
- Westrem, Scott D. (2000). "Iceland". In John Block Friedman; Kristen Mossler Figg (eds.). Trade, Travel and Exploration in the Middle Ages: An Encyclopedia. Routledge. pp. 271–274.
