= Solveig Þorleifsdóttir =

15th-century Icelandic noblewoman

- Born: 1415
- Died: 1479 (aged 63–64)
- Spouse: Ormur Loftsson (1434–1446)
- Partner: Sigmund Steinþórsson
- Children: Einar Ormsson, Loftur Ormsson Íslendingur, Jón Sigmundsson, Ásgrimur Sigmundsson, Bergljót Sigmundsdóttir, Ástríður Sigmundsdóttir, Guðrún Sigmundsdóttir
- Parent(s): Þorleifur Árnason, Vatnsfjarðar-Kristín Björnsdóttir
- Relatives: Einar Þorleifsson (brother), Björn Þorleifsson (brother), Árni Þorleifsson, Helga (the elder) Þorleifsdóttir (sister), Helga (the younger) Þorleifsdóttir (sister), Guðný Þorleifsdóttir (sister)

Solveig Þorleifsdóttir (c. 1415–1479) was an Icelandic noblewoman during the 15th century and the daughter of Þorleifur Árnasson of Auðbrekka and his wife Vatnsfjarðar-Kristín Björnsdóttir. She had five children and was excommunicated from the Catholic church in 1474.

== Family ==
Solveig married the seneschal Ormur Loftsson, son of Loftur Guttormsson ríka ("the rich") on October 17, 1434. They lived in Víðidalstunga and had two sons: Einar and Loftur Ormsson Íslendingur ("the Icelander"). It is not certain when Ormur died, although it was probably around 1446. There are sources stating that he had traveled abroad that year directly against Solveig's wishes. She had said that he would be responsible for whatever came from it—and she began to be romantically involved with Sigmundur Steinþórsson, priest of Miklibær in Blönduhlíð while Ormur was gone. Solveig became Reverend Sigmundur's mistress, possibly while Ormur was still alive.

Solveig and Sigmundur's children were:

- Jón Sigmundsson, a lawyer
- Ásgrimur, who was killed at his brother Jón's wedding in Víðidalstunga in 1483
- Bergljót, a housewife in Reykir in Miðfjörður
- Ástríður, wife of Pétur Trúels Tómasson (also known as Pétur skytta)
- Guðrún

== Excommunication ==
Sigmundur was involved in a difficult dispute with Bishop Ólafur Rögnvaldsson and with his successor at Miklibær, Reverend Jón Broddason. Solveig played a role in the situation, and she is considered to have encouraged Reverend Sigmundur in his dispute with Jón. As a result, she was excommunicated on December 20, 1474. The accusations against her included attacking a certain priest when he tried to read out a letter to the church in Flatatunga where Solveig and Sigmundur lived and taking the letter from him. In a letter by Reverend Jón Broddason about the incident, he writes that Solveig was headstrong, obstinate, and malevolent, which led to her defiance of the excommunication.
