= Ísafjarðardjúp =

Fjord in the Westfjords, Iceland

Coordinates: 66°10′N 23°00′W

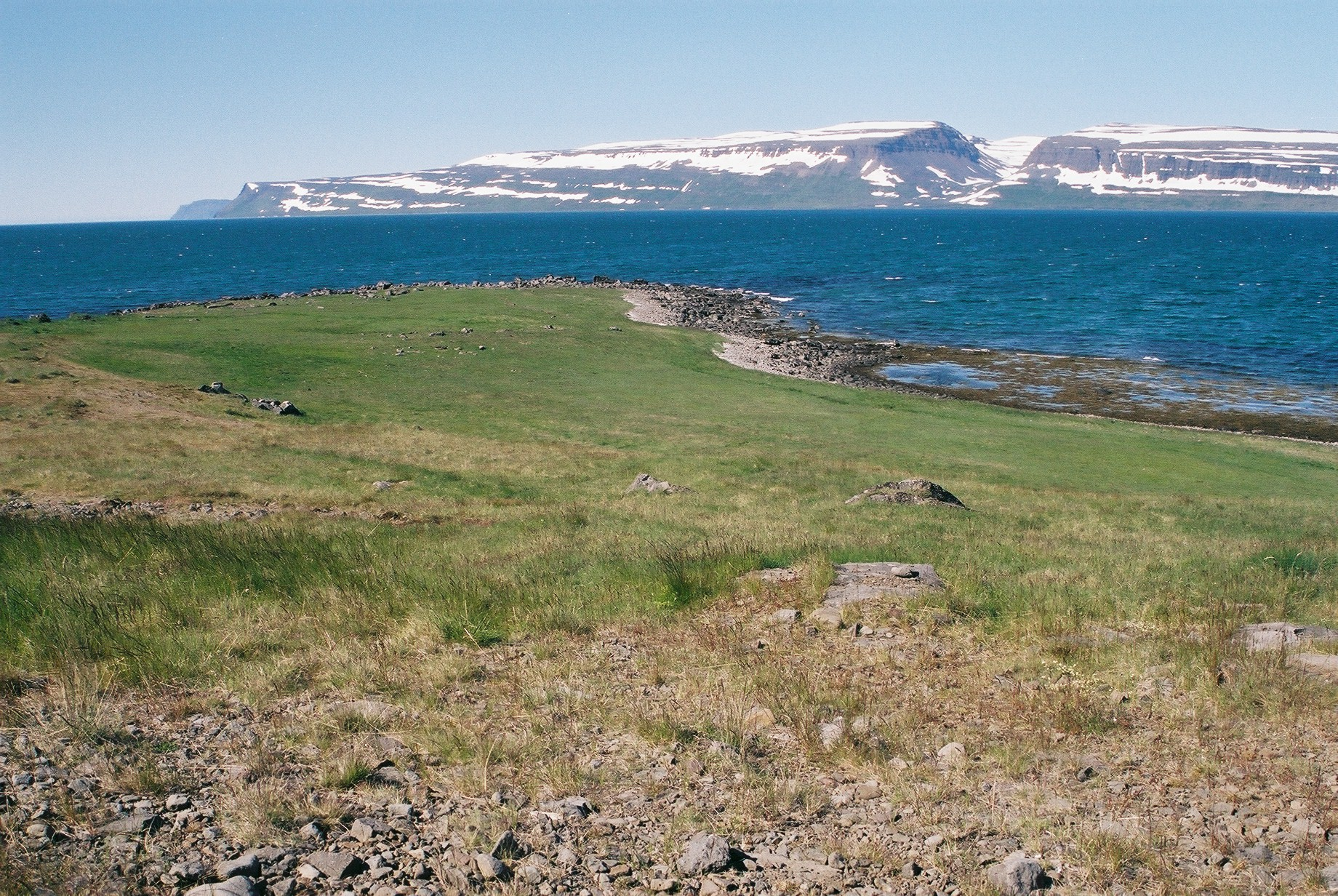
View over Ísafjarðardjúp to Snæfjallaströnd

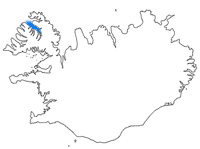
Location of Ísafjarðardjúp in Iceland

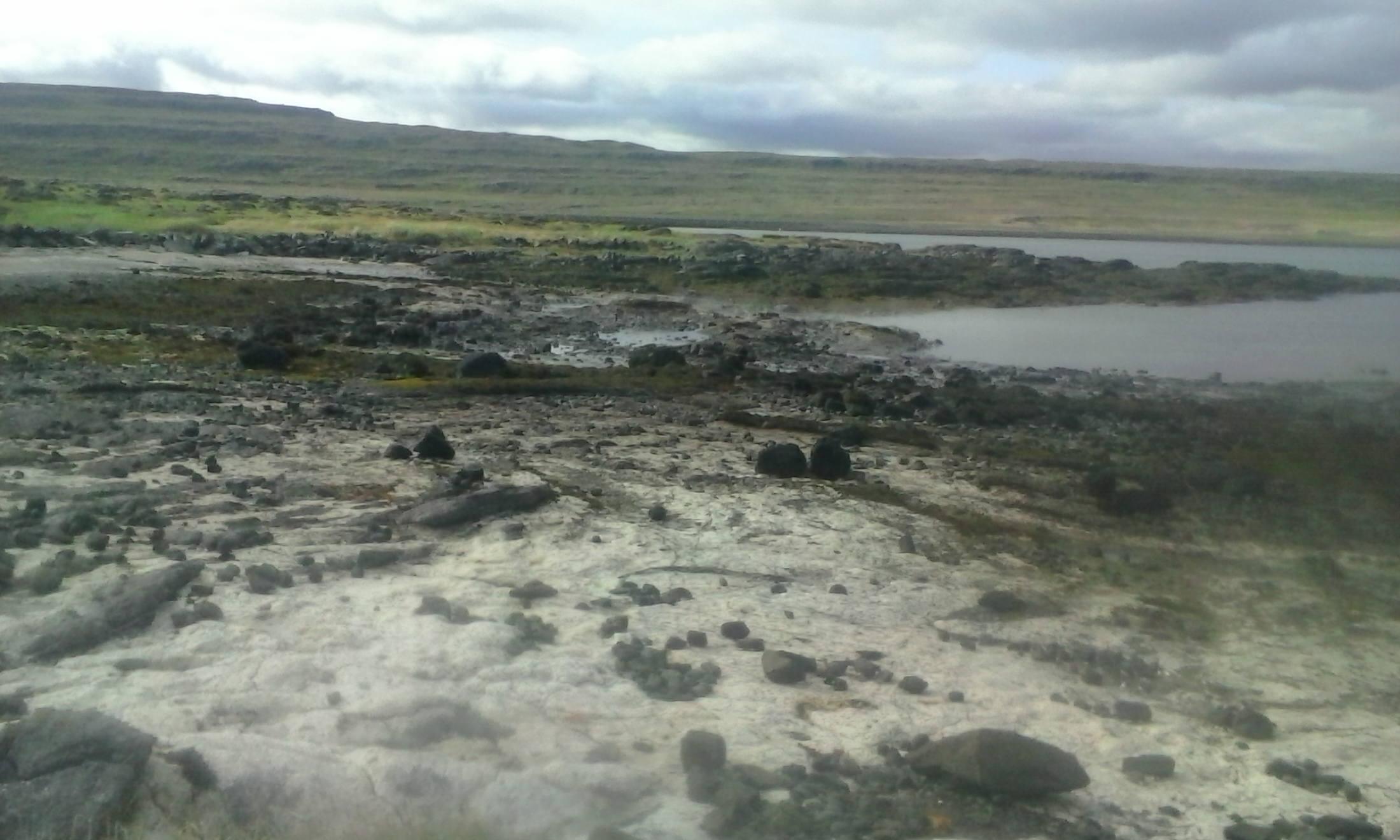
Reykjanes, Ísafjarðardjúp

Ísafjarðardjúp, main fjords, islands, mountains and villages

Ísafjarðardjúp (Icelandic pronunciation: [ˈiːsaˌfjarðarˌtjuːp]) is a large fjord in the Westfjords region of Iceland. Its name translates to Depth of the fjord of sea ice. Originally named simply Ísafjörður, the semantic run around happened through the -Deep meaning the inner parts of the fjord being reapplied throughout the innsea. It has even been suggested that this is nonsensical and should be reversed. The fjord was named simultaneously with the island by Raven-Floke as he viewed it from a mountain from the south.

Ísafjörður, capital of the Westfjords region, is situated close to the mouth of Ísafjarðardjúp in Skutulsfjörður. Other major settlements in Ísafjarðardjúp are Bolungarvík, Hnífsdalur and Súðavík.

The north-eastern coast is fairly straight with the only inlet being Kaldalón, but the southern side has fjords extending well into the land: Skutulsfjörður, Álftafjörður, Seyðisfjörður, Hestfjörður, Skötufjörður, Mjóifjörður, Reykjafjörður and Ísafjörður.

Three islands lie in Ísafjarðardjúp: Borgarey, Æðey and Vigur. Borgarey is the smallest with no inhabitants and Æðey the largest. On both Æðey and Vigur there is one farmstead.

On the peninsula of Reykjanes, there are hot springs and hydrothermal alteration.

In the bottom of the fjord lies the former trading post Arngerðareyri.
