= Skíðaríma =

Skíðaríma (Icelandic pronunciation: [ˈsciːðaˌriːma]) is a humorous Icelandic ríma, of unknown authorship, dated to around 1450–1500.

== Summary ==
The hero is the audacious and inventive beggar Skíði, who was apparently a historic figure from the 12th century. It was also a real event that he had a dream in 1195, and it is this dream that is the matter of Skíðaríma. Skíði dreams that Óðinn sends Þórr to fetch Skíði in order to broker peace between Heðinn and Högni as their incessant war about Hildr threatens to destroy Valhalla. Skíði manages to make peace by asking to marry Hildr and finding her willing.

However, as Skíði could not stop mentioning the word God in front of the Æsir, and finally makes the sign of the cross, Heimdallr struck him in the mouth with the Gjallarhorn. However, some of the Einherjar side with Skíði, whereas others are against him. A great battle ensued with a great many heroic deeds, some of them done by the pathetic beggar himself, until finally Sigurðr the dragon slayer throws him out through the door. Skíði wakes up with a lot of pain in a farm on Iceland.

The depiction of the grovelling, avaricious and impudent beggar is considered to be very funny, and the poem is full of burlesque humour.

== Editions and translations ==
- Maurer, Konrad von (ed.), Die Skída-ríma (Munich: Verlag der k. Akademie, 1869)
- Kvæðasafn eptir íslenzka menn frá miðöldum og síðari öldum. Fyrsta deild: Ljóðmæli nafngreindra höfunda (Hið íslenska bókmentafélag, 1922).
- Finnur Jónsson (ed.), Rímnasafn: Samling af de ældste islandske rimer, Samfund til udgivelse af gammel nordisk litteratur, 35, 2 vols (Copenhagen: Møller and Jørgensen, 1905-22), I:10–40.
- Finnur Jónsson's 1929 Copenhagen edition.
- Theo Homan (ed.), Skíðaríma: An Inquiry into Written and Printed Texts, References and Commentaries, Amsterdamer Publikationen zur Sprache und Literatur, 20 (Amsterdam: Rodopi, 1975) (including an English translation pp. 347–59)
- Text in modern Icelandic spelling at Bragi

== Manuscripts ==
The oldest manuscript of the ríma is Reykjavík, Stofnun Árna Magnússon, Am 1025 4to, copied in 1737 by Jón Þorkelsson Skálholtsrektor.

- Manuscripts listed at Handrit.is
