= Æðey =

Small island in the Westfjords region of Iceland

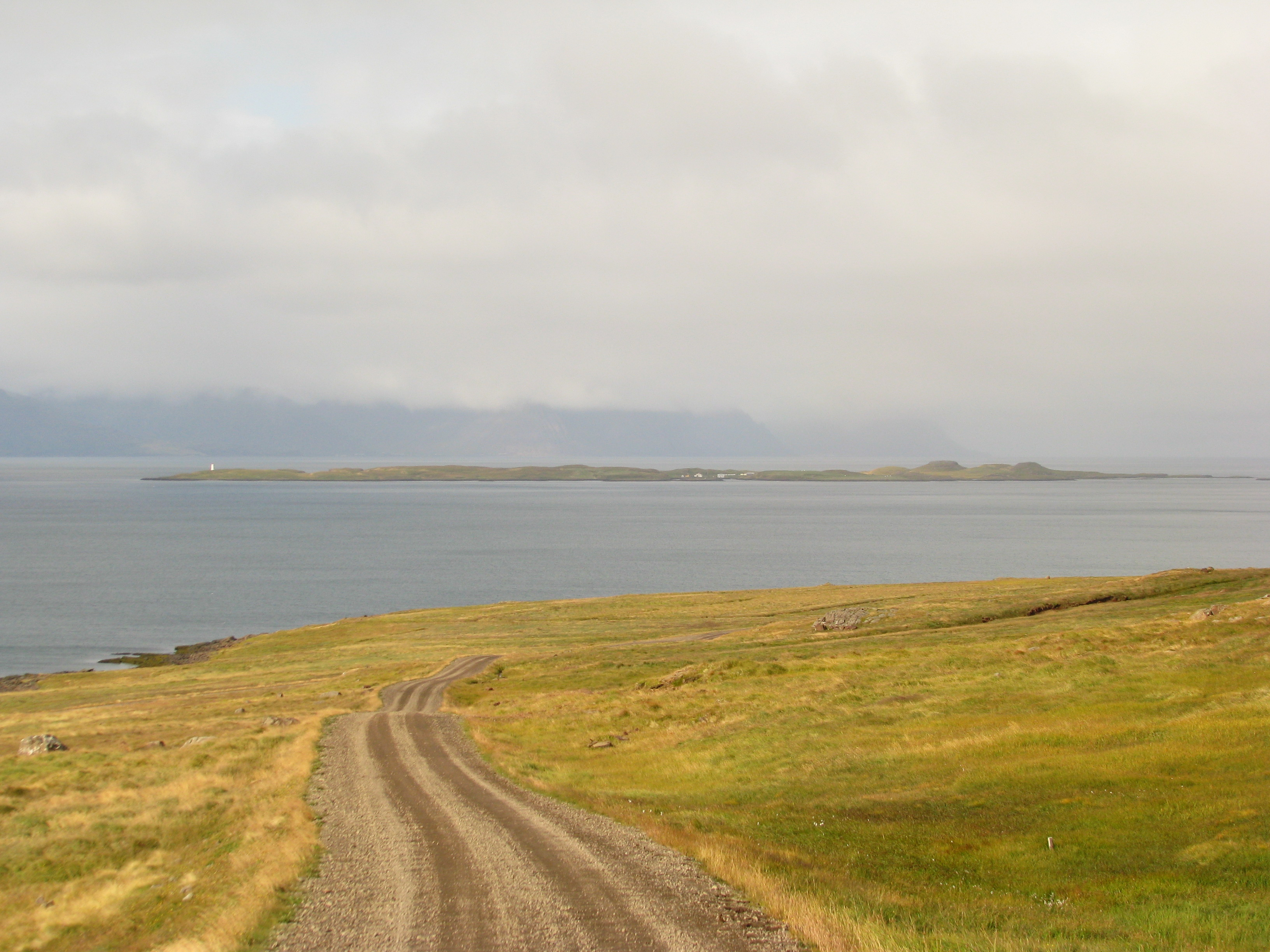
- Æðey in Ísafjarðardjúp

- Location within Iceland

Geography
- Location: Ísafjarðardjúp
- Coordinates: 66.1004°N 22.6617°W
- Area: 1.76 km^{2} (0.68 sq mi)

Administration
- Iceland
- Constituency: Northwest
- Region: Vestfirðir

Demographics
- Languages: Icelandic
- Ethnic groups: Icelanders

Additional information
- Time zone: WET (UTC+0)

Æðey (Icelandic pronunciation: [ˈaiːðˌeiː]; lit. Eider Island) is an island located in the Westfjords region of Iceland. A höfuðból was built in the 19th century with a farm, with descendants of the family going to the house in the summer to maintain the farm. Other structures include a lighthouse and a weather station owned by the Icelandic Meteorological Office.

The island is home to multiple species of birds such as the common eider, with its feathers being harvest by the family that resides on the island. Mammals such as sheep can be found on the island though are often shipped to the mainland to not disturb the eider and puffin population.

== Geography ==
Æðey is the biggest of the four islands located on the biggest bay of the Westfjords, being located in Ísafjarðardjúp. The island is separated by 15 kilometres (9.3 miles) of water away from Ísafjörður. It is 2.2 kilometres (1.4 miles) long and 0.8 kilometres (0.50 miles) wide, with its highest point being 21 metres (69 ft) above sea level. The island is vegetated.

== History ==
In 1615, some Basque whalers were whaling and had crashed in Strandir. Five of the whalers traveled to Æðey and settled there. After the magistrate of Ísafjörður, Ari Magnússon, had found out about the whalers on the island, he ordered a fleet of ships to go to the island. All of the whalers on the island were killed by the forces.

== Structures and demographics ==
A höfuðból (manor house) was built in the 19th century on the island by married couple Guðmundur Rósinkarsson and Guðrún Jónsdóttir. After Rósinkarsson's death in 1906, the couple's children: Ásgeir, Halldór, and Sigríður, inherited the house and ran the farm alongside their mother. As of 2019, the descendants of the family reside in the house every summer to rear cattle, geese and sheep, and harvest eiderdown.

A lighthouse was built on the island in 1944, though it was not active until 1949 due to lighting material shortages during World War II. It is located on the southern tip of the island and measures 13 metres (43 ft) high. There is a weather station on the island owned by the Icelandic Meteorological Office. In 2010, the island had one resident named Ólafur Ragnarson. He was a worker at the weather station and monitored the weather data. The station was made automatic in 2012.

== Fauna ==
The island is home to species of bird such as the common eider, black guillemot, puffins, and breeds of geese. In a survey made by Náttúrustofa Vestfjarða in 2022, they had counted around 667 pairs of the black guillemot. Mammals such as cattle, sheep, and minks can be found on the island. The sheep are often ferried to the mainland during summer for grazing to not interfere with the eiders. A dog named Tása is owned by the family that resides on the island. Marine life such as humpback whales can be found off the shore of the island.
