= Homiliarium =

Set of short scripture explanations

A homiliarium or homiliary is a collection of homilies, or familiar explanations of the Gospels.

== History ==
=== Late Antiquity ===
From a very early time the homilies of the Fathers were in high esteem, and were read in connection with the recitation of the Divine Office (see also Breviary). St. Gregory the Great refers to this custom, and St. Benedict mentions it in his rule, dating it to as early as the sixth century. This was particularly true of the homilies of Pope Leo I, very terse and peculiarly suited to liturgical purposes.

=== Medieval Europe ===
As new feasts were added to the Office, the demand for homilies became greater and by the eighth century, the century of liturgical codification, collections of homilies began to appear. Such a collection was called a homiliarium, or homiliarius (i.e. liber) doctorum. In the early Middle Ages numerous collections of homilies were made for purposes of preaching.

Many homiliaria have survived, and there are medieval references to many others. Mabillon (De Liturgia Gallicana) mentions a very old Gallican homiliarium. A manuscript of the eighth century refers to a homiliarium by Agimundus, a Roman priest. The Venerable Bede compiled one in England. In the episcopal library at Würzburg there is preserved a homiliarium by Bishop Burchard, a companion of St. Boniface. Alanus, Abbot of Farfa (770), compiled a large homiliarium, which must have been often copied, for it has reached us in several manuscripts. In the first half of the ninth century Smaragdus of Saint-Mihiel compiled from the Fathers a book of homilies on the Gospels and Epistles for the whole year. Haymo, a monk of Fulda and disciple of Alcuin, afterwards Bishop of Halberstadt (841), made a collection for Sundays and feasts of the saints. Rabanus Maurus, another pupil of Alcuin, and Eric of Auxerre compiled each a collection of homilies. All these wrote in Latin.

== Homiliarium of Charlemagne ==
Perhaps the most famous homiliarium is that of Paul Warnefrid, better known as Paul the Deacon, a monk of Monte Cassino. It was made by order of Charlemagne.

The purpose of this work is disputed. Johann Lorenz von Mosheim and August Neander, followed by various encyclopedias and many Protestant writers, describe it as compiled in order that the clergy might at least recite to the people the Gospels and Epistles on Sundays and holidays. The Catholic Encyclopedia disagrees, saying that the royal decree clarifies that this particular collection was not made for pulpit use but for the recitation of the Breviary, and that copies were made only for such churches as were wont to recite the Office in choir.

Manuscript copies of this homiliarium are found at Heidelberg, Frankfurt, Darmstadt, Fulda, Gießen and Kassel. The manuscript mentioned by Mabillon, and rediscovered by Ranke, in Karlsruhe, is older than the tenth century Monte Cassino copy. The earliest printed edition is that of Speyer in 1482. In the Cologne edition (sixteenth century) the authorship is ascribed to Alcuin, but the royal decree alluded to leaves no doubt as to the purpose or author; Alcuin may have revised it. As the fifteenth or sixteenth century, this work was in use for homiletic purposes.

== Anglican homiliaria ==
Title page of Cranmer's Book of Homilies.

During the English Reformation, Thomas Cranmer and others saw the need for local congregations to be taught Anglican theology and practice. Since many priests and deacons were still uneducated, semi-literate and tending toward Roman Catholicism in their teachings and activities, it was decided to create a series of homilies to be read out during the church service by the local Priest.

The First book of Homilies contained twelve sermons and was written mainly by Cranmer. They focused strongly upon the character of God and Justification by Faith and were fully published by 1547.

The Second book of Homilies contained twenty-one sermons and was written mainly by Bishop John Jewel, and were fully published by 1571. These were more practical in their application and focused more on living the Christian life.

The reading of the Homilies as part of the church service was supported by Article XXXV of the Thirty-Nine Articles.

== Translations and collections ==
Translations of homilies were frequently ordered by the Catholic Church, and became common. Alfred the Great translated into Anglo-Saxon the homilies of Venerable Bede, and for the clergy the "Regula Pastoralis" of St. Gregory the Great. Ælfric selected and translated into the same language passages from St. Augustine of Hippo, St. Jerome, Bede, St. Gregory, Smaragdus and occasionally from Haymo. His aim was to work the extracts into a whole, and thus present them in an easy and intelligible style. The first German translation of this kind was due to Ottfried of Weißenburg.

Collections of the homilies of the Greek and Latin Church Fathers will be found in Migne's "Patrology". An account of the editions of their works, homilies included, is in Otto Bardenhewer's Patrology. The surviving Irish homilies are found principally in "The Speckled Book" (Leabhar Breac), which is written partly in Latin and partly in Irish. It is largely taken up with homilies and passions, lives of the saints etc. The "Book of Ballymote" contains, amongst miscellaneous subjects, Biblical and hagiological matter; and the "Book of Lismore" contains lives of the saints under the form of homilies.

The binding and illumination of gospels and homiliaria were both elaborate and artistic. They were frequently deposited in a highly wrought casket (Arca Testamenti), which in Ireland was called cumdach (shrine). Emperor Constantine the Great presented a text of the Gospels with costly binding to the church of St. John Lateran; and Queen Theodolinda made a similar presentation to the church at Monza.

== See also ==
- Homiletics
- Postil
