= 1910 New Zealand rugby union tour of Australia =

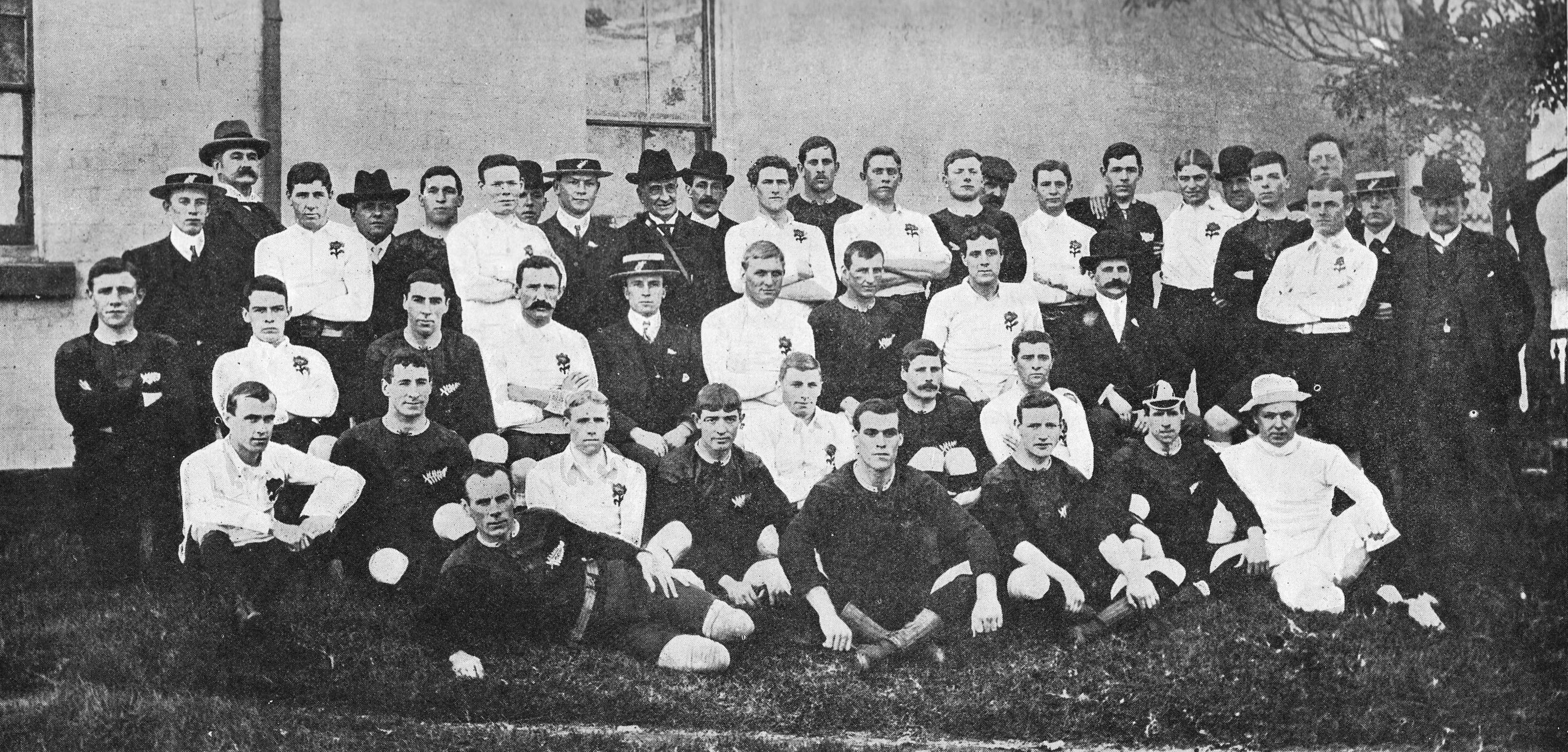
- New Zealand and NSW Waratahs teams posing together in their second match, 15 June
- Manager: V.R.S Meredith
- Tour captain: Fred Roberts
- Top point scorer: Joe O'Leary (21)
- Top try scorer: Harry Paton (6)
Summary
P	W	D	L
Total
8	7	0	1
Test match
3	2	0	1
Opponent
P	W	D	L
Australia
3	2	0	1

Tour chronology
- Previous tour: 1907 Australia
- Next tour: 1913 North America

The 1910 New Zealand tour rugby to Australia was the seventh tour by the New Zealand national team to Australia. Four matches were played against regional sides (all won) along with three Test matches between the two national sides.

New Zealand won the series with two victories to one.

== Touring party ==
- Manager: V.R.S Meredith
- Captain: Fred Roberts

Name	Position	Province
Joe O'Leary	Utility back	Auckland
Paddy Burns	Utility back	Canterbury
James Ryan	Utility back	Wellington
Billy Mitchell	Wing Three-quarter	Canterbury
Frank Mitchinson	Three-quarter	Wellington
Jack Stohr	Three-quarter	Taranaki
Frank Wilson	Wing	Auckland
William Fuller	Fly-half	Canterbury
Simon Mynott	Fly-half	Taranaki
Fred Roberts	Halfback	Wellington
Henry Avery	Wing forward	Wellington
Alf Budd	Loose forward	South Canterbury
Ranji Wilson	Loose forward	Wellington
Sandy Paterson	Loose forward	Otago
Gerald McKellar	Loose forward	Wellington
Fred Ivimey	Loose forward	Otago
Arthur Francis	Loose forward	Auckland
James Maguire	Forward	Auckland
David Evans	Lock	Hawke's Bay
Harry Paton	Lock	Otago
Sam Bligh	Hooker	West Coast
Jimmy Ridland	Hooker	Southland

== Match summary ==
Complete list of matches played by New Zealand in Australia:

Test matches

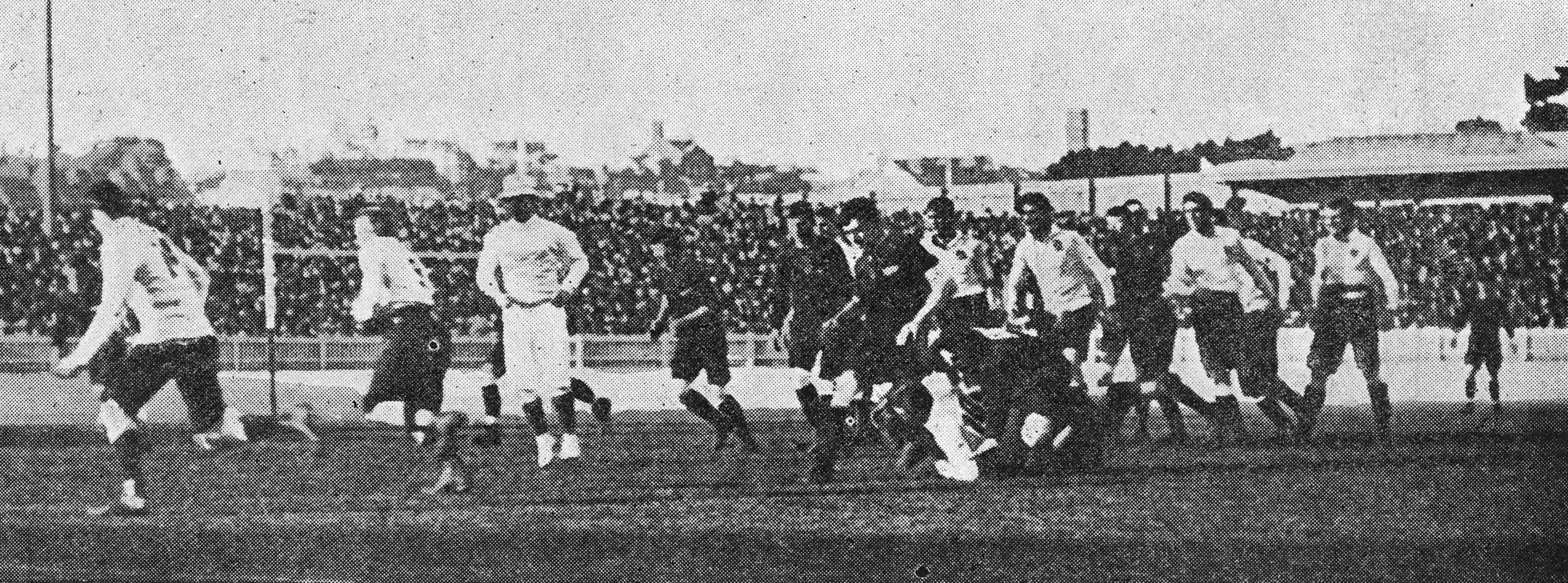
The second match v. the Waratahs in Sydney, 15 June

#	Date	Rival	City	Venue	Score
1	3 Jun	Wellington RU	Wellington	Athletic Park	26–17
2	13 Jun	NSW Waratahs	Sydney	Cricket Ground	21–8
3	15 Jun	NSW Waratahs	Sydney	Cricket Ground	17–11
4	18 Jun	Queensland Reds	Brisbane	Exhibition Ground	19–15
5	22 Jun	Queensland Reds	Brisbane	Exhibition Ground	21–3
6	25 Jun	Australia	Sydney	Cricket Ground	6–0
7	27 Jun	Australia	Sydney	Cricket Ground	0–11
8	2 Jul	Australia	Sydney	Cricket Ground	28–13

Balance
Pl	W	D	L	Ps	Pc
8	7	0	1	138	78

== See also ==
- List of All Blacks tours and series
