= Alf Budd =

Alf Budd may refer to:

- Alf Budd (rugby union, born 1880) (1880–1962), New Zealand rugby union player who played for the All Blacks in 1910
- Alf Budd (rugby union, born 1922) (1922–1989), New Zealand rugby union player who played for the All Blacks in 1946 and 1949
