= Protestant culture =

Cultural practices common to Protestantism

Protestant culture refers to the cultural practices that have developed within Protestantism. Although the founding Protestant Reformation was a religious movement, it also had a strong impact on all other aspects of life: marriage and family, education, the humanities and sciences, the political and social order, the economy, and the arts.

Protestantism has promoted economic growth and entrepreneurship, especially in the period after the Scientific and the Industrial Revolution. Scholars have identified a positive correlation between the rise of Protestantism and human capital formation, work ethic, economic development, the rise of early experimental science, and the development of the state system.

== The role of families, women, and sexual minorities ==
All Protestant churches allow their clergy to marry, in contrast to the Catholic Church. This meant that the families of many members of the Protestant clergy were able to contribute to the development of intellectual elites in their countries from about 1525, when the theologian Martin Luther was married.

Historically, the role of women in church life, the Protestant clergy, and as theologians remained limited. The role of women expanded over time and was closely associated with the movements for universal education and women's suffrage. Political and social movements for suffrage (voting rights) and sobriety (see temperance movement and Prohibition) in the English-speaking world of the late 19th and early 20th centuries were closely associated with Protestant Christian women's organizations.

While particular Protestant churches such as the Methodists involved women as clergy or assistants since the late 1700s, the ordination of women as clergy dates from the 1940s in the Lutheran churches, and from the 1970s in the Anglican Communion. Since about 1990, many more women have assumed senior leadership roles (e.g. as bishops) in several Protestant churches, including the Anglican Communion and the Church of England.

Despite increasing acceptance for female pastors, in 2023, the Southern Baptist Convention—the U.S.'s largest Protestant denomination—voted by an overwhelming majority to restrict the role to men. In doing so, the Convention ejected five congregations with female pastors. To add this rule to the church's constitution, a second vote had to be held in 2024 and reach a two-thirds majority. The measure narrowly failed with 61% voting in favor. This prevented the preliminary ban from being added to the denomination's constitution, but did not change its doctrinal position. Some members felt it was not necessary to add to the constitution, since the denomination has adopted the practice of expelling offending churches. The Convention voted again by a 92% majority to expel a church which had allowed a female pastor to serve women and children congregants.

Since the 1990s Protestant churches have encountered controversy regarding the Church's response to persons of minority sexual orientations. The sometimes divisive nature of these discussions was exemplified by the formation of dissenting groups within the Anglican Communion that rejected reforms that were intended to make the Church more inclusive. In the 21st century, debates over same-sex marriage and the ordination of LGBTQ clergy have led to splits within the United Methodist Church, the Episcopal Church, the Evangelical Lutheran Church, the Presbyterian Church, the American Baptist Church, and the Southern Baptist Convention. While in some cases individual congregations have left (or been ejected from) their denomination, in others, separate denominations have been formed in opposition to church policy.

== Education ==
Since Reformers wanted all members of the church to be able to read and study the Bible and catechisms, support for education at all levels increased over time in Europe, the Americas, and in other parts of the world that were influenced by contact with European educators and missionaries. Compulsory education for both boys and girls was introduced. For example, the Puritans who established Massachusetts Bay Colony in 1628 founded Harvard College only eight years later. About a dozen other American colleges followed in the 18th century, including Yale University (1701). Pennsylvania also became a centre of learning. By initiating translations of the Bible into various national languages, Protestantism supported the development of national literatures.

Some of the first colleges and universities in America, including Harvard, Yale, Princeton, Columbia, Dartmouth, Williams, Bowdoin, Middlebury, and Amherst, all were founded by mainline Protestant denominations.

== Thought and work ethic ==
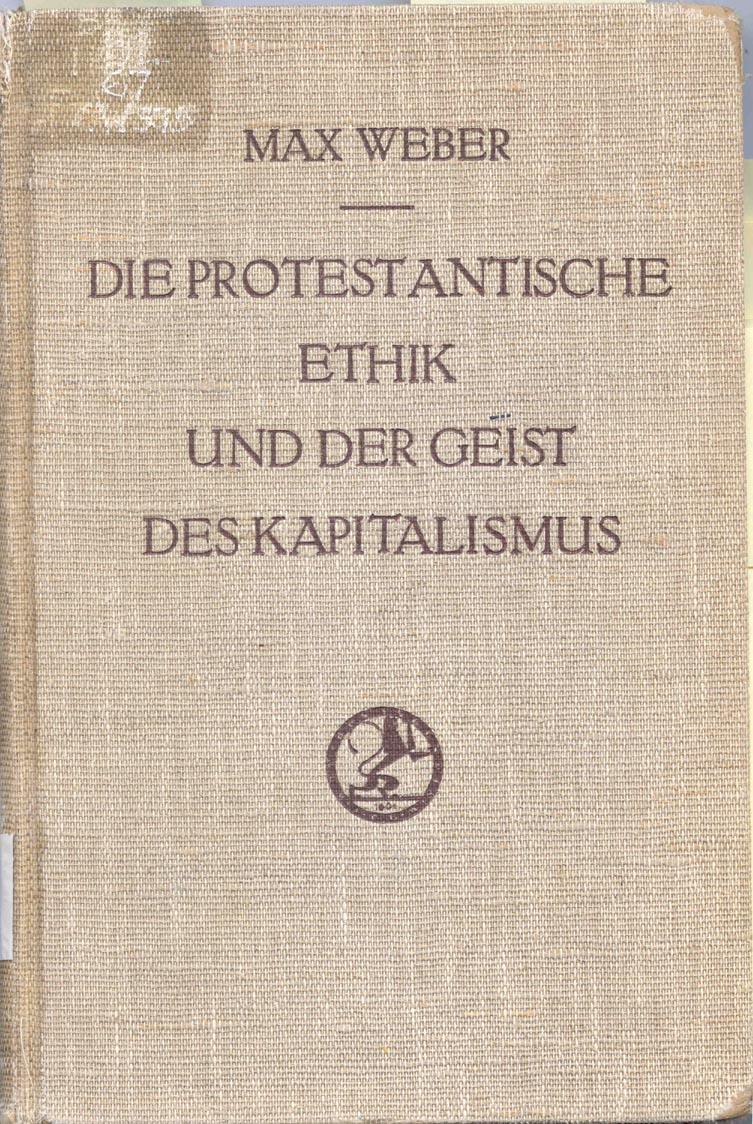
Cover of the original German edition of The Protestant Ethic and the Spirit of Capitalism

The Protestant concept of God and man allows believers to use all their God-given faculties, including the power of reason. That means that Protestant believers are encouraged to explore God's creation and, according to Genesis 2:15, make use of it in a responsible and sustainable way. Thus a cultural climate was created that greatly enhanced the development of the humanities and the sciences. Another consequence of the Protestant understanding of man is that the believers, in gratitude for their election and redemption in Christ, are to follow God's commandments. Industry, frugality, calling, discipline, and a strong sense of responsibility are at the heart of their moral code. In particular, John Calvin rejected luxury. Therefore, craftsmen, industrialists, and other businessmen were able to reinvest the greater part of their profits in the most efficient machinery and the most modern production methods that were based on progress in the sciences and technology. As a result, productivity grew, which led to increased profits and enabled employers to pay higher wages. In this way, the economy, the sciences, and technology reinforced each other. The chance to participate in the economic success of technological inventions was a strong incentive to both inventors and investors. The Protestant work ethic was an important force behind the unplanned and uncoordinated mass action that influenced the development of capitalism and the Industrial Revolution. This idea is also known as the "Protestant ethic thesis."

Some mainline Protestant denominations such as Episcopalians, Presbyterians and Congregationalists tend to be considerably wealthier and better educated than most other Christian denominations in America, having a higher proportion of graduate and post-graduate degrees per capita. Protestants are disproportionately represented in the upper reaches of American business, law and politics, especially the Republican Party. Large numbers of the most wealthy and affluent American families such as the Vanderbilts and Astors, Rockefellers, Du Ponts, Roosevelts, Forbes, Whitneys, Mellons, Morgans and Harrimans are Mainline Protestant families.

According to a 2014 study by the Pew Research Center, Episcopalians ranked as the third most financially successful religious group in the United States, with 35% of Episcopalians living in households with incomes of at least $100,000, while and Presbyterians ranked as the fourth most financially successful religious group in the United States, with 32% of Presbyterians living in households with incomes of at least $100,000. According to the same study there is correlation between education and income, about 59% of American Anglican have a graduate and post-graduate degree, followed by Episcopalians (56%) and Presbyterians (47%).

== Science ==
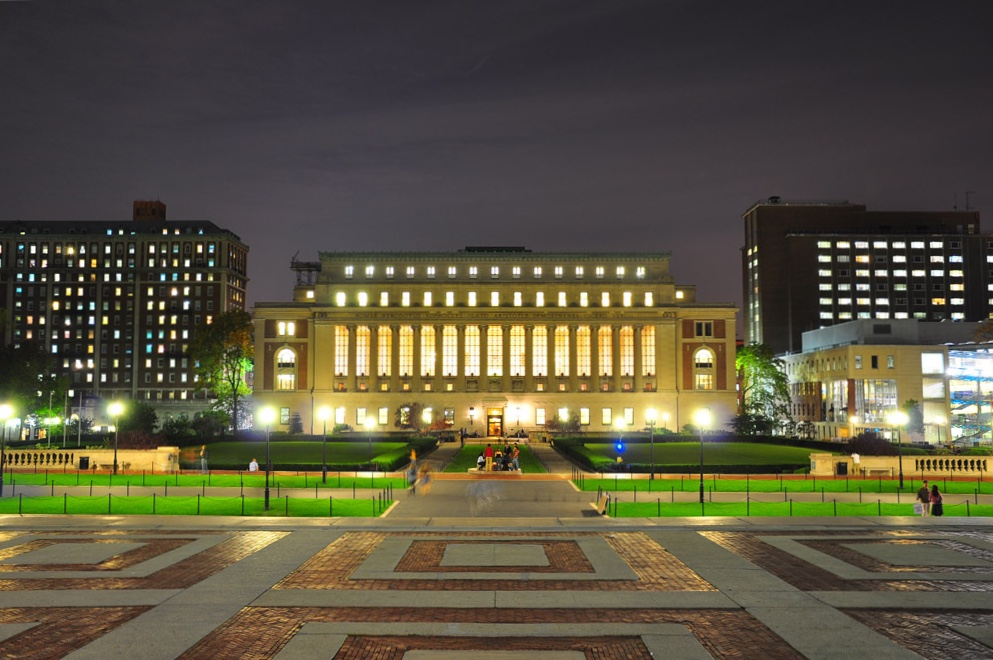
Columbia University was established by the Church of England.

Protestantism had an important influence on science. According to the Merton Thesis, there was a positive correlation between the rise of Puritanism and Protestant Pietism on the one hand and early experimental science on the other. The Merton Thesis has two separate parts: Firstly, it presents a theory that science changes due to an accumulation of observations and improvement in experimental techniques and methodology; secondly, it puts forward the argument that the popularity of science in 17th-century England and the religious demography of the Royal Society (English scientists of that time were predominantly Puritans or other Protestants) can be explained by a correlation between Protestantism and the scientific values. In his theory, Robert K. Merton posited that English Puritanism and German Pietism were responsible for the development of the Scientific Revolution of the 17th and 18th centuries. Merton explained that the connection between religious affiliation and interest in science was the result of a significant synergy between the ascetic Protestant values and those of modern science. Protestant values encouraged scientific research by allowing science to study God's influence on the world and thus providing a religious justification for scientific research.

According to Harriet Zuckerman's review of American Nobel Prize laureates from 1901 to 1972, 72% were of Protestant background. According to Zuckerman, Protestants featured among the American laureates in a slightly greater proportion (72%) than their prevalence within the general population (about 2/3). Overall, Protestants have won a total of 84.2% of all the American Nobel Prizes in Chemistry, 60% in Medicine and 58.6% in Physics between 1901 and 1972.

According to 100 Years of Nobel Prizes (2005), a review of Nobel Prizes awarded between 1901 and 2000, 65.4% of Nobel Prize laureates, have identified Christianity in its various forms as their religious preference (423 prizes). While 32% have identified Protestant in its various forms (208 prize). although Protestant comprise 11.6% to 13% of the world's population.

== Government ==
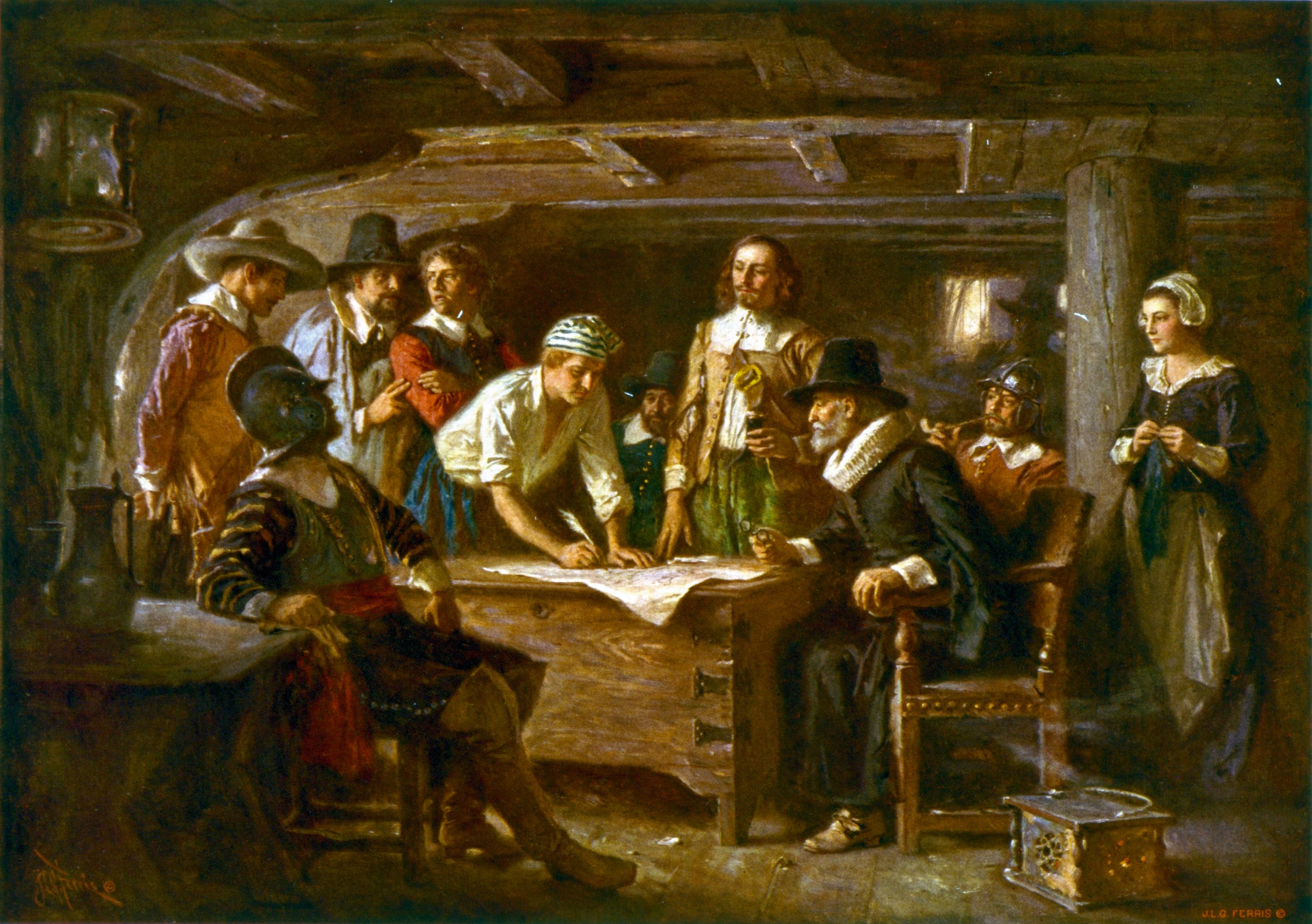
Signing the Mayflower Compact 1620, a painting by Jean Leon Gerome Ferris 1899

In the Middle Ages, the Church and the worldly authorities were closely related. Martin Luther believed that the spiritual and secular worlds were governed by different authorities. This was significantly influenced by the fact that in his time, Lutherans were considered heretics and persecuted under Catholic rule. He believed that "true Christians" (Note: "If the world consisted only of true Christians, neither law nor justice would be needed. True Christians are 'in their very nature' such that they are taught better by the Spirit than by any law... But 'the world and the masses are and always will be un-Christian, even if they are all baptized and Christian in name.' True Christians 'are few and far between.' Thus it is necessary, in order that evil may not triumph, to have law and enforceable order.") obeyed God's will without need for laws, while the secular authorities had no choice but to rule by force, dictated through laws and enforced by violence. Luther's doctrine of the priesthood of all believers upgraded the role of laymen in the church considerably. The members of a congregation had the right to elect a minister and, if necessary, to vote for his dismissal. Calvin strengthened this basically democratic approach by including elected laymen (church elders, presbyters) in his representative church government. The Huguenots added regional synods and a national synod, whose members were elected by the congregations, to Calvin's system of church self-government. This system was taken over by the other Reformed churches.

Politically, John Calvin favoured a mixture of aristocracy and democracy. He appreciated the advantages of democracy: "It is an invaluable gift, if God allows a people to freely elect its own authorities and overlords." Calvin also thought that earthly rulers lose their divine right and must be put down when they rise up against God. To further protect the rights of ordinary people, Calvin suggested separating political powers in a system of checks and balances. Thus, he and his followers resisted political absolutism and paved the way for the rise of modern democracy. 16th century Calvinists and Lutherans developed a theory of resistance called the doctrine of the lesser magistrate which was later employed in the U.S. Declaration of Independence. Under Calvinist leadership, the Netherlands were among the freest countries in Europe in the seventeenth and eighteenth centuries. It granted asylum to philosophers like René Descartes, Baruch Spinoza and Pierre Bayle. Hugo Grotius was able to teach his natural-law theory and a relatively liberal interpretation of the Bible.

Consistent with Calvin's political ideas, Protestants were key in forming both the English and the American democracies. Later, the British imposed their democratic ideals upon their colonies. In the 19th and 20th centuries, the British variety of modern-time democracy, constitutional monarchy, was taken over by Protestant-formed Sweden, Norway, Denmark, and the Netherlands as well as the Catholic countries Belgium and Spain. In North America, Plymouth Colony and Massachusetts Bay Colony practised democratic self-rule and separation of powers. These Congregationalists were convinced that the democratic form of government was the will of God. The Mayflower Compact was a social contract.

Protestants have always played a decisive role in British and American politics. The Act of Settlement stipulated that all British monarchs and their spouses must be Protestants. Except for John F. Kennedy and Joe Biden, both Catholics, all presidents of the United States have been members of Protestant churches or have had a Protestant background.

== Rights and liberty ==
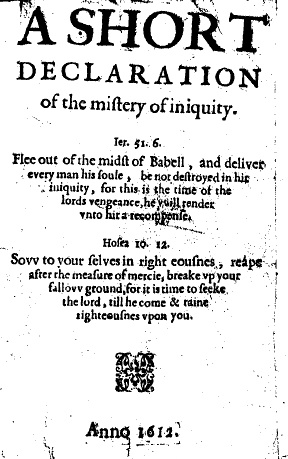
A Short Declaration of the Mistery of Iniquity (1612) by Thomas Helwys. For Helwys, religious liberty was a right for everyone, even for those he disagreed with.

Protestants helped to incorporate concept of religious freedom into Christianity, though anti-Catholic sentiment was deeply embedded in Protestant culture for much of its history due to the circumstances of its founding. Freedom of conscience had had high priority on the theological, philosophical, and political agendas since Luther refused to recant his beliefs before the Diet of the Holy Roman Empire at Worms in 1521. In his view, faith was a free work of the Holy Spirit and could therefore not be forced on a person. The persecuted Anabaptists and Huguenots demanded freedom of conscience, and they practised separation of church and state.

In the early seventeenth century, Baptists like John Smyth and Thomas Helwys published tracts in defence of religious freedom. Their thinking influenced John Milton's and John Locke's stance on tolerance.

In the 16th century, the Puritan movement was founded in opposition to perceived residual Catholicism in the Church of England. The Puritans felt that the Church had not been fully reformed, and further changes had to be made. While short-lived, the Puritan movement was extremely influential on British and early American history.

Under the leadership of Baptist Roger Williams, Congregationalist Thomas Hooker, and Quaker William Penn, respectively, Rhode Island, Connecticut, and Pennsylvania combined democratic constitutions with freedom of religion. These colonies became safe havens for certain persecuted religious minorities, including Jews.

The United States Declaration of Independence, the United States Constitution, and the Bill of Rights codified religious liberty by giving it a legal and political framework. The great majority of American Protestants, both clergy and laity, strongly supported the independence movement. Adherents of all major Protestant churches were represented in the First and Second Continental Congresses.

Despite the nation's nominal support for religious freedom, most states either prohibited Catholics from holding office or required them to denounce the papacy to do so. Anti-Catholic sentiment continued to proliferate and hit its peak during the 19th century, due to an influx of Irish Catholic immigrants fleeing the Potato Famine. Throughout America's colonial era and its early history, there were mob attacks against Catholics, as well as Quakers and Mormons. The state of Utah was settled by Mormons, who were fleeing persecution in other states.

The nation's skepticism toward Catholics remained present until at least the 1960s, when some feared that Kennedy's election to the Presidency may result in American being controlled by the Pope. On the campaign trail, he declared that his loyalty was to the U.S. first and foremost, hoping to assuage those fears. Mitt Romney, a Mormon candidate, made a similar declaration half a century later.

In the nineteenth and twentieth centuries, the American democracy became a model for numerous other countries throughout the world. The strongest link between the American and the French Revolution was Marquis de Lafayette, an ardent supporter of the American constitutional principles. The French Declaration of the Rights of Man and of the Citizen was mainly based on Lafayette's draft of this document. The Declaration by United Nations and Universal Declaration of Human Rights also echo the American constitutional tradition.

Central ideas from the Reformation and early Protestantism – democracy, social-contract theory, separation of powers, religious freedom, separation of church and state – were elaborated on and popularized by Age of Enlightenment thinkers. Many philosophers of the English, Scottish, German, and Swiss Enlightenment had a Protestant background. For example, John Locke, whose political thought was based on "a set of Protestant Christian assumptions", derived the equality of all humans, including the equality of the genders, from Genesis 1, 26–28. As all persons were created equally free, all governments needed the consent of the governed. These Lockean ideas were fundamental to the United States Declaration of Independence, which also deduced human rights from the biblical belief in creation: “We hold these truths to be self-evident, that all men are created equal, that they are endowed by their Creator with certain unalienable Rights, that among these are Life, Liberty, and the pursuit of Happiness.” These rights were theonomous ideas, not derived from a concept of autonomous man. In colonial America, there was "the broadly accepted notion of equality by creation."

Protestants were also involved in movements to advocate for other human rights. For example, torture was abolished in Prussia in 1740, slavery in Britain in 1834 and in the United States in 1865 (William Wilberforce, Harriet Beecher Stowe, Abraham Lincoln). Hugo Grotius and Samuel Pufendorf were among the first thinkers who made significant contributions to international law. The Geneva Convention, an important part of humanitarian international law, was largely the work of Henry Dunant, a reformed pietist. He also founded the Red Cross.

== Social teaching ==
Most Protestants have always felt obliged to help people. They have founded hospitals, homes for disabled or elderly people, educational institutions, organisations that give aid to developing countries, and other social welfare agencies. In the nineteenth century, throughout the Anglo-American world numerous dedicated members of all Protestant denominations were active in social reform movements such as the abolition of slavery, prison reforms, and woman suffrage. As an answer to the "social question" of the nineteenth century, Germany under Chancellor Otto von Bismarck introduced insurance programs that led the way to the welfare state (health insurance, accident insurance, disability insurance, old-age pensions). To Bismarck this was "practical Christianity". These programs, too, influenced many other nations, particularly in the Western world.

However, in America, contemporary evangelicals and the Christian right more broadly are often skeptical of state interference in the market economy and social welfare programs. Fundamentalist radio preachers in the 1950s capitalized on the Red Scare to draw attention to their broadcasts. Billy Graham, a key figure in the American Evangelical movement, owed early advances in his career to Sen. Joseph McCarthy. This proximity to anticommunist efforts helped to solidify economic conservatism as an American Protestant value, to the extent that welfare programs are sometimes case as "anti-Christian" by fundamentalists. Protestant opponents of welfare programs claim that they reward idleness, disincentivize marriage, and create reliance on the federal government.

== Arts ==
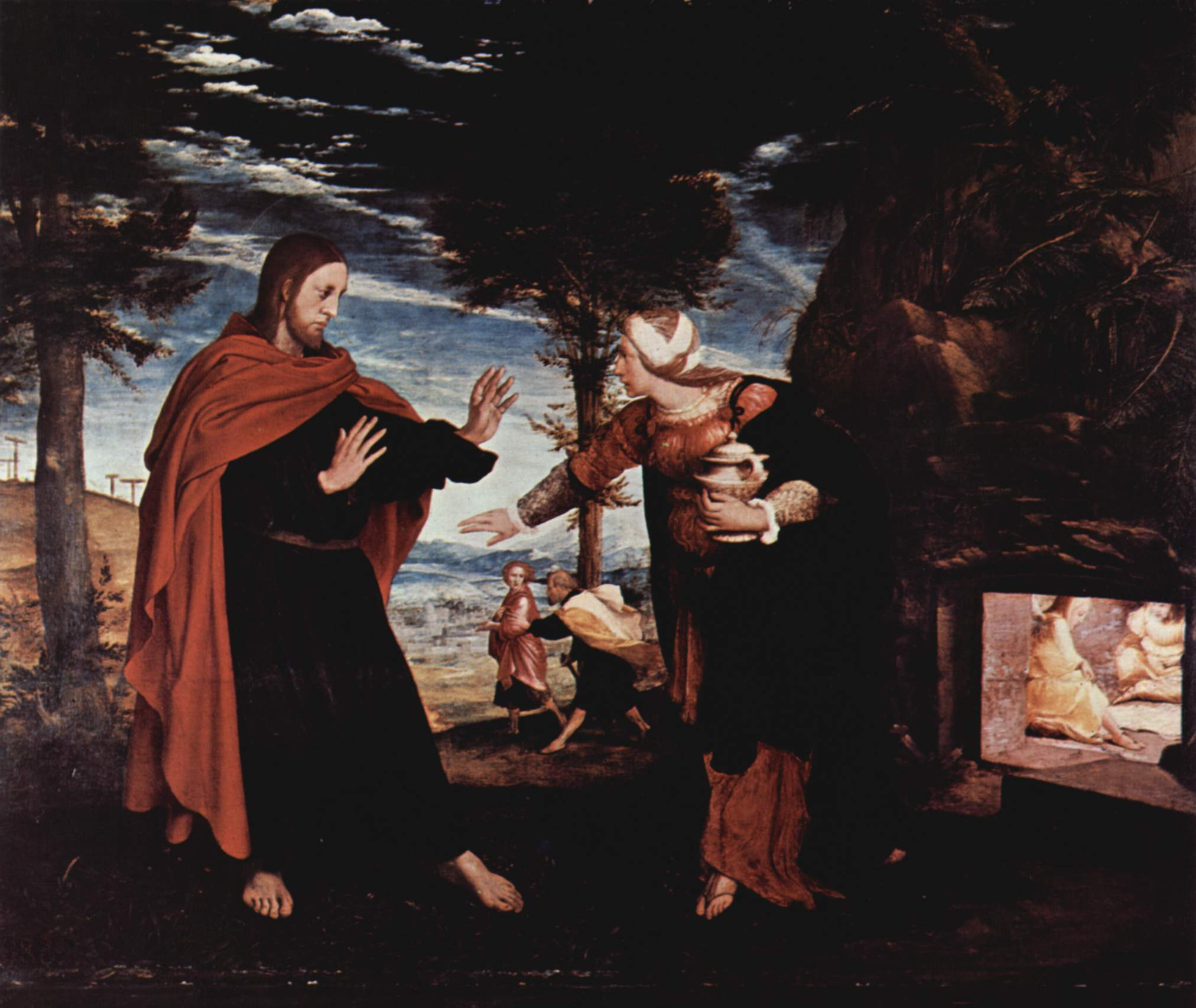
Hans Holbein the Younger's Noli me tangere.

The arts have been strongly inspired by Protestant beliefs. Martin Luther, Paul Gerhardt, George Wither, Isaac Watts, Charles Wesley, William Cowper, and many other authors and composers created well-known church hymns. Musicians like Heinrich Schütz, Johann Sebastian Bach, George Frederick Handel, Henry Purcell, Johannes Brahms, and Felix Mendelssohn-Bartholdy composed great works of music. Prominent painters with Protestant background were, for example, Albrecht Dürer, Hans Holbein the Younger, Lucas Cranach, Rembrandt, and Vincent van Gogh. World literature was enriched by the works of Edmund Spenser, John Milton, John Bunyan, John Donne, John Dryden, Daniel Defoe, William Wordsworth, Jonathan Swift, Johann Wolfgang Goethe, Friedrich Schiller, Samuel Taylor Coleridge, Edgar Allan Poe, Matthew Arnold, Conrad Ferdinand Meyer, Theodor Fontane, Washington Irving, Robert Browning, Emily Dickinson, Emily Brontë, Charles Dickens, Nathaniel Hawthorne, John Galsworthy, Thomas Mann, William Faulkner, John Updike, and many others.

== See also ==
- Christianese
- Christian culture
- Role of the Christian Church in civilization
- The Reformation and its influence on church architecture
- American exceptionalism#Puritan roots and Protestant promise
- Reformation era literature
