= Fred Ivimey =

New Zealand rugby union player

- Born: Frederick Elder Birbeck Ivimey; 28 March 1880 Prittlewell, Essex, England
- Died: 6 December 1961 (aged 81) Christchurch, New Zealand
- Height: 1.79 m (5 ft 10 1/2 in)
- Weight: 79 kg (175 lb)
- Occupation: Regular soldier

Rugby union career
- Position: Loose forward
Provincial / State sides
Years	Team	Apps	(Points)
1907–10	Otago	17	
1911–13	Southland		
International career
Years	Team	Apps	(Points)
1910	New Zealand	0	(0)

Frederick Elder Birbeck Ivimey (28 March 1880 – 6 December 1961) was a New Zealand rugby union player. A loose forward, Ivimey represented Otago and Southland at a provincial level between 1907 and 1913. He travelled with the New Zealand national side, the All Blacks, on their 1910 tour of Australia, but played just one match, against Queensland, because of injury. He did not appear in any Test matches.

A son of Robert Lincoln Ivimey (1848–1927), Ivimey was a great-grandson of John Ivimey (1790–1874), a younger brother of Joseph Ivimey (1773–1834), Baptist minister and historian. He was also a cousin of the organist and composer John Ivimey. Born in Prittlewell, Essex, England, on 28 March 1880, Ivimey emigrated to New Zealand as a child. He served with New Zealand forces during the Second Boer War and later served as a regular soldier from 1904 until 1931. During World War II Ivimey served as a records and recruitment officer in Christchurch from 1939, before being transferred to the retired list with the rank of captain in August 1944. He died in Christchurch on 6 December 1961.
