= Harry Paton =

Harry Paton may refer to:

- Harry Paton (rugby union) (1881–1964), New Zealand rugby union player
- Harry Paton (soccer) (born 1998), Canadian soccer player

== See also ==
- Harry Patton (1884–1930), American baseball player
