= Sandy Paterson =

Sandy Paterson may refer to:

- Sandy Paterson (football manager) (died 1933), Scottish football manager
- Sandy Paterson (rugby union) (1885–1933), New Zealand rugby union player

== See also ==
- Alexander Paterson (disambiguation)
- Sandy Patterson (1916–1997), Australian rules footballer
