= John Murton (theologian) =

English minister and theologian

The Reverend John Murton
- Born: 1585; Gainsborough, Lincolnshire, Kingdom of England
- Died: c. 1626 (aged 41); City of London, Kingdom of England
- Occupations: Minister, theologian
- Notable work: A Most Humble Supplication of the King's Majesty's Loyal Subjects (1620)

John Murton (1585 – c. 1626) was an English Nonconformist Puritan minister and theologian in England. John Murton's ideas of credobaptism, separation of the Church from secular power and regenerated church membership in the Church spread throughout England and America and formed the basis of the Baptist tradition, along with the Puritan theologians John Smyth and Thomas Helwys, in the 17th century.

== Life ==
John Murton was born in 1585. He was a furrier by trade in Gainsborough. He joined the Gainsborough Puritans in the Gainsborough congregation in the early 17th century. The church was exiled to Amsterdam, Holland, where it was renamed as the Baker Street congregation. Years later the church returned to England, in London. Murton had been a close disciple of the cleric John Smyth after the exile in Holland, and later returned to England with Thomas Helwys, the Puritan leader, and the other exiled Puritans. The church was reestablished in White's Alley, Spitalfields.

Murton spent time in gaol with Helwys before his death, and then became minister of the White's Alley church. Murton ministered the church until 1624, after he discussed with some members.

John Murton wrote several works influencing the Baptists in England and America, such as Roger Williams who opened his influential book, The Bloudy Tenent of Persecution by reprinting parts of John Murton's published tract A Most Humble Supplication of the King's Majesty's Loyal Subjects (1620).
