= Gerald McKellar =

Gerald McKellar may refer to:

- Gerald Colin McKellar (1903–1970), Australian politician
- Gerald McKellar (rugby union) (1884–1960), New Zealand rugby union player
