= William Fuller (rugby union) =

- Born: William Bennett Fuller; 9 April 1883 Christchurch, New Zealand
- Died: 25 July 1957 (aged 74) Christchurch, New Zealand

Rugby union career
International career
Years	Team	Apps	(Points)
1910	New Zealand		

William Bennett Fuller (9 April 1883 – 25 July 1957) was an All Blacks rugby union player from New Zealand. He was a five-eighth and threequarter.

He played six matches for the All Blacks including two tests; scoring 15 points (5 tries) for New Zealand in 1910, including one test try (3 points).

He was born and died in Christchurch.
