= Alexander Paterson =

Alexander Paterson may refer to:

- Alexander Paterson (Australian politician) (1844–1908), independent member of the Australian House of Representatives
- Alexander Paterson (penologist) (1884–1947), British penologist
- Alexander Paterson (bishop) (1766–1831), Roman Catholic bishop in Scotland
- Alexander McDonald Paterson (1871–1953), Canadian politician
- Alex Paterson (born 1959), English musician
- A. N. Paterson (Alexander Nisbet Paterson], 1856–1947), Scottish Arts & Crafts architect

== See also ==
- Sandy Paterson (disambiguation)
- Alexander Patterson (1911–1993), Canadian politician
