= John Ivimey =

English organist and composer

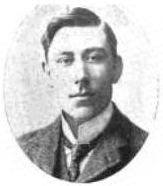
- In The Sketch, 6 November 1901

Background information
- Born: 12 September 1868; Stratford, London, England
- Died: 16 April 1961 (aged 92); Marlborough, Wiltshire, England
- Occupation: Composer
- Instrument: Organ

John William Ivimey (12 September 1868 – 16 April 1961) was an English organist and composer who specialized in comic operas. He also worked as director of music in schools and churches.

Ivimey was awarded the degree of Doctor of Music by the University of Oxford in 1916.

== Early life ==
Born at Stratford, Essex, Ivimey was one of the nine children of Joseph Ivimey and Emma Stevens. He was educated at Herne Bay College and the Guildhall School of Music. His grandfather, another John Ivimey (1790–1874), was a younger brother of Joseph Ivimey (1773–1834) a Particular Baptist minister and historian, both being sons of Charles Ivimey, tailor, of Ringwood, Hampshire. He was a cousin of the New Zealand rugby footballer Fred Ivimey (1880–1961).

== Career ==
Ivimey was only twenty when he was appointed as assistant to Alan Gray at Wellington College in 1888.

While composing about twenty comic operas, as well as a symphony, a grand opera, cantatas and other songs, and much organ music, Ivimey was successively organist at St Peter's, Norbiton, and St Paul's, Onslow Square. He also wrote articles for magazines and journals and edited hymn books and books of songs.

In 1892, his first operetta, Fairy Genesta, was produced at Surbiton, and he appeared in it himself. A reviewer praised both his work and his performance: "Laughing Mrs Cooper, pretty Miss Inez Roe, indefatigable Mr Orlebar, droll Mr Trouncer, and droller Mr Ivimey, in one night winning more renown (in Surbiton) than John Gilpin in his famous ride, or many a heaven-sent genius after years of patient toil."

After Wellington, Ivimey worked at Harrow School, the Chelsea Polytechnic, Dulwich College, and Cheltenham College, before being appointed as Director of Music at Marlborough College in 1915, continuing in post for twenty-five years.

By 1922 he was a Fellow of the Royal College of Organists and an Associate of the Royal College of Music.

In August 1933, Ivimey was appointed by Arthur Buxton as organist and director of music at All Souls, Langham Place. His last musical engagement was as organist at Llandaff Cathedral. In 1935, he published Boys and Music, his reminiscences of working in schools.

== Private life ==
In 1893, Ivimey married firstly Mabel Caroline Cancellor, at Hampstead. Their daughter Edith Frances was born in 1894, in Wandsworth, and their son Alan Victor J. R. Ivimey in Fulham in 1900.

His first wife died in Surrey in 1947, aged 78. Later the same year, Ivimey married secondly Irene Glew, at Wells.

Ivimey died on 16 April 1961, living in retirement at Hillside, Bath Road, Marlborough, Wiltshire, leaving a widow, Irene Ivimey.

== Works ==
- Fairy Genesta (operetta, produced at Surbiton, 1892)
- Y'lang Y'lang (operetta, produced at Surbiton, 1893)
- The Red Rider (operetta, produced at St George's Hall, London, 1894)
- Marie Tanner (burletta, produced at Cardiff, 1897, words by Broughton Black, Poland Henry, music by Ivimey)
- Rose of Lancaster (opera)
- Boys and Music (Reminiscences of five English Public Schools) (Marlborough: County Paper Office, 1935)
