= Alf Budd (rugby union, born 1922) =

- Born: Thomas Alfred Budd; 1 August 1922 Bluff, New Zealand
- Died: 8 March 1989 (aged 66) Whangārei, New Zealand
- Height: 1.85 m (6 ft 1 in)
- Weight: 93 kg (205 lb)

Rugby union career
- Position: Lock
Provincial / State sides
Years	Team	Apps	(Points)
1946–52	Southland	53	
International career
Years	Team	Apps	(Points)
1946, 1949	New Zealand	2	(0)

Thomas Alfred "Alf" Budd (1 August 1922 – 8 March 1989) was a New Zealand rugby union player. A lock, Budd represented Southland at a provincial level, and was a member of the New Zealand national side, the All Blacks, for one match in each of 1946 and 1949.

Both of his appearances for the All Blacks were Test matches against Australia. In the 1946 match, New Zealand captained by Fred Allen won 14-10 but in the 1949 match the All Blacks led by Johnny Smith lost 9–16.

Budd featured in the Southland team in the 1940s and 50s who held the Ranfurly Shield and had victories over international teams.

Budd died in Whangārei on 8 March 1989, and he was buried at Onerahi Cemetery.

On Thursday 23 June 2022, there was a special presentation of an All Black cap for Alf Budd. This was held at the All Blacks training camp in Northland, attended by his son Leicester and daughter Margaret Keene

Alf is not known to have been any relation to Alf Budd of Timaru who played for the All Blacks on the 1910 tour of Australia.
