= Henry Avery (rugby union) =

Henry Avery CMG CBE DSO
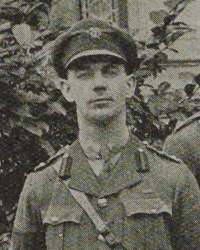
- Avery in 1919
- Born: Henry Esau Avery; 3 October 1885 Wellington, New Zealand
- Died: 22 March 1961 (aged 75) Wellington, New Zealand
- Height: 1.80 m (5 ft 11 in)
- Weight: 82 kg (180 lb)
- School: Wellington College

Rugby union career
- Position: Wing-forward
Provincial / State sides
| Years | Team | Apps | (Points) |
| 1905–10 | Wellington | | |
International career
| Years | Team | Apps | (Points) |
| 1910 | New Zealand | 3 | (0) |

Henry Esau Avery CMG CBE DSO (3 October 1885 – 22 March 1961) was a New Zealand rugby union player, military officer and businessman. He played three rugby test matches for New Zealand in 1910, served as quartermaster general in New Zealand's military forces during World War II, and founded Avery Motors, the Wellington franchisee for Ford cars, in the 1920s.

== Early life and family ==
Born in Wellington on 3 October 1884, Avery was the son of Helen Jane Avery (née Boyle) and her husband Joseph Avery. He was educated at Wellington College. On 2 July 1913 Avery married Alice Maude Draper at the Church of the Nativity in Blenheim. The couple went on to have seven children between 1914 and 1929.

== Rugby union ==
A wing-forward, Avery represented Wellington at a provincial level from 1905 to 1910, and was a member of the New Zealand national side, the All Blacks, on their tour of Australia in 1910. He played six matches for the All Blacks on that tour including three internationals. He twice served as club captain of the Wellington College Old Boys Rugby Football Club, in 1920 and then from 1923 to 1924.

== Military career ==
Avery joined the New Zealand Field Artillery Volunteers as a gunner in 1904, and rose through the ranks to be commissioned as a lieutenant in 1910. In January 1911 he became a regular soldier in the New Zealand Military Forces as a lieutenant in the New Zealand Staff Corps. He was promoted to temporary captain in July 1911 and captain in April 1914.

During World War I, Avery was transferred into the New Zealand Army Service Corps and served overseas with the New Zealand Expeditionary Force in Egypt, Gallipoli and France, rising to the rank of lieutenant colonel. In June 1916 he was appointed a Companion of the Distinguished Service Order, and between 1916 and 1919 he was mentioned in dispatches four times. In the 1919 King's Birthday Honours, Avery was appointed a Companion of the Order of St Michael and St George in recognition of services rendered in relation to military operations in France and Flanders.

After the end of the war, Avery served as New Zealand's military representative in the War Office in London from 1920 to 1921, and trained at the Staff College, Camberley from 1921 to 1922. He was transferred to the Reserve of Officers in 1925. He received the New Zealand Long and Efficient Service Medal in 1920.

Avery served as president of the Wellington branch of the Returned Soldiers Association from 1930 to 1932.

Following the outbreak of World War II, Avery was recalled to serve at army headquarters in Wellington in August 1940. Two months later he was promoted to colonel and appointed quartermaster general and third military member of the Army Board, and remained in those posts until he was seconded to the War Assets Realisation Board as general manager in September 1944. He retired from that role and the army in March 1949, having been promoted to the rank of brigadier in late 1941. In the 1943 New Year Honours, Avery was appointed a Commander of the Military Division of the Order of the British Empire. He was also awarded the Legion of Merit (Commander degree) by the American government.

== Business career ==
Avery obtained the franchise for Ford motor vehicles and established Avery Motors in Wellington in 1924. He was general manager of the company from 1924 to 1936. He then became the secretary and assistant manager of the New Zealand Centennial Exhibition from 1937 to 1940.
