= Joseph Ivimey =

English Particular Baptist minister and historian

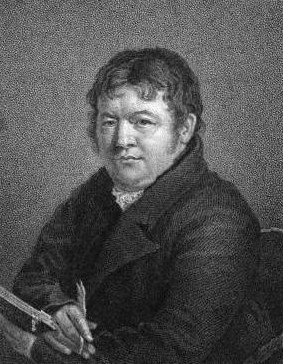
- Born: 22 May 1773; Ringwood, Hampshire, England
- Died: 8 February 1834 (aged 60)
- Occupation: English particular baptist minister

Joseph Ivimey (22 May 1773 – 8 February 1834) was an English Particular Baptist minister and historian.

== Life ==
He was the eldest of eight children of Charles Ivimey (died 24 October 1820), a tailor, by his wife Sarah Tilly (died 1830), and was born at Ringwood, Hampshire, on 22 May 1773. He was brought up under Arian influences, but became convinced by the Calvinism of the Particular Baptists. On 16 September 1790 he received adult baptism from John Saffery at Wimborne, Dorset.

Ivimey became a tailor at Lymington, Hampshire, where he moved on 4 June 1791. In April 1793 he sought employment in London; he finally left Lymington in 1794 for Portsea, Hampshire. Here he became an itinerant preacher. Early in 1803 he was recognised as a minister, and settled as assistant to Robert Lovegrove at Wallingford, Berkshire. He was chosen pastor of the Particular Baptist church, Eagle Street, Holborn in London, on 21 October 1804, and was ordained on 16 January 1805.

From 1812 Ivimey acted on the committee of the Baptist Missionary Society. On 19 April 1814 the Baptist Society for Promoting the Gospel in Ireland was formed, and Ivimey was the first secretary (an honorary office); he visited Ireland in May 1814, and retained the secretaryship till 3 October 1833. In 1817, and again in 1819, he made missionary journeys to the Channel Islands. At Portsea, on 18 August 1820, his father and mother received adult baptism at his hands. His strictness caused in 1827 a secession of fifty or sixty members from his church.

Ivimey opposed Catholic emancipation and the repeal of the Test and Corporation Acts, and at length separated himself from the "three denominations" after their meeting at Dr. Williams's Library on 20 January 1829, to promote emancipation. He advocated the abolition of colonial slavery; and, to commemorate the abolition, saw foundation-stones of Sunday-school premises and almshouses connected with Eagle Street Church laid on 12 November 1833.

Ivimey died on 8 February 1834, and was buried on 15 February at Bunhill Fields. A tablet to his memory was placed in the boys' schoolroom at Eagle Street.

== Works ==
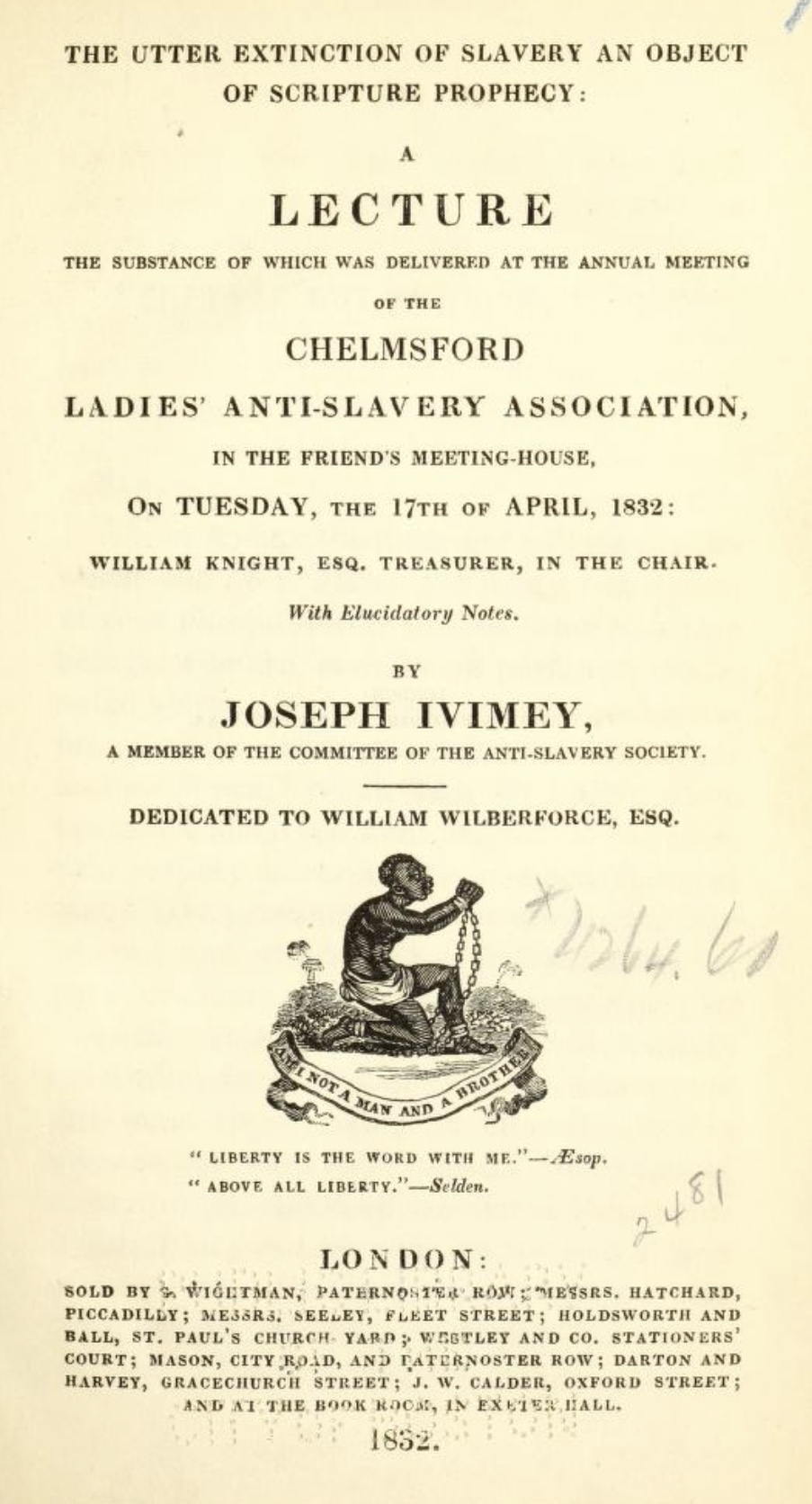
Title page of a published lecture against slavery, 1832

Ivimey was a prolific writer. His History of the English Baptists was projected in 1809, primarily with a biographical aim. The work swelled to four volumes (1811–30). George Gould criticised its accuracy, except where Ivimey followed Thomas Crosby.

Other publications were:

- Joseph Ivimey: A History of the English Baptists
- The History of Hannah, 1808.
- A Brief Sketch of the History of Dissenters, 1810.
- A Plea for the Protestant Canon of Scripture, 1825.
- The Life of Mr. John Bunyan, 1825.
- Communion at the Lord's Table, 1826 (against open communion, in reply to Robert Hall).
- Pilgrims of the Nineteenth Century, 1827, intended as a continuation of Bunyan's Pilgrim's Progress.
- Letters on the Serampore Controversy, 1831.
- The Triumph of the Bible in Ireland, 1832.
- The utter Extinction of Slavery, 1832.

His John Milton; his Life and Times, 1833 was announced as a corrective to previous opinions. It was republished in America, and formed part of an influential trend. From the 1820s onwards biographers of Milton took him as an advocate of the views of the English Dissenters, and so as a Whig. Other related biographies were those by William Carpenter, Cyrus Edmonds and Edwin Paxton Hood. Ralph Waldo Emerson's view of Milton matched quite closely what he read in Ivimey, as well as American patriotic comment of the time. In writing a lecture of 1835 on Milton, Emerson drew closely on Ivimey and the biography by Charles Symmons. Ivimey's Appendix of Animadversions on Samuel Johnson's view of Milton ended by calling him "the contracted Tory pensioner, dictionary compiler, high-church bigot, and semi-popish reviler".

Ivimey wrote also many single sermons and tracts, including funeral sermons for William Button and Daniel Humphrey (both 1821); memoirs of Caleb Vernon (1811), William Fox of the Sunday School Society (1831), and William Kiffin (1833); and anti-papal pamphlets (1819, 1828, 1829). He contributed to the Baptist Magazine from 1809, generally as "Iota"; from 1812 he was one of the editors. He edited, among other works, the 4th edition, 1827, of Persecution for Religion, by Thomas Helwys, originally published 1615; Bunyan's Pilgrim's Progress with notes, 1821, and the 1692 Life of John Bunyan, 1832.

== Family ==
Ivimey married, first, on 7 July 1795, Sarah Bramble (died 1806), by whom he had two sons and four daughters: a son and daughter survived him; secondly, on 7 January 1808, Anne Price (died 2 January 1820), a widow (whose maiden name was Spence) with three children; by her he had no issue.

His nephew Joseph Ivimey (1845–1897) was the father of John Ivimey (1868–1961) an organist and composer.
