= James Maguire (rugby union) =

- Born: James Richard Maguire; 6 February 1886 Auckland, New Zealand
- Died: 1 December 1966 (aged 80) Lower Hutt, New Zealand
- Occupation: Blacksmith

Rugby union career
- Position(s): Backrow forward Hooker
Provincial / State sides
Years	Team	Apps	(Points)
1905–10	Auckland	34	
International career
Years	Team	Apps	(Points)
1910	New Zealand	3	(0)

James Richard Maguire (6 February 1886 – 1 December 1966) was a New Zealand rugby union player. Mainly a backrow forward, Maguire represented Auckland at a provincial level between 1905 and 1910. He was a member of the New Zealand national side, the All Blacks, on their 1910 tour of Australia. He played six matches for the All Blacks on that tour—five of them at hooker—including three internationals.

Maguire was also a noted rower, being a part of the Waitemata four that won a national title in 1909.

Maguire died in Lower Hutt on 1 December 1966, and was buried at Karori Cemetery.
