= Alf Budd (rugby union, born 1880) =

- Born: Alfred Budd; 27 January 1880 Timaru, New Zealand
- Died: 7 November 1962 (aged 82) Melbourne, Victoria, Australia
- School: Timaru Main School

Rugby union career
- Position: Loose forward
Provincial / State sides
Years	Team	Apps	(Points)
1903–08	South Canterbury	18	
International career
Years	Team	Apps	(Points)
1910	New Zealand	0	(0)

Alfred Budd (22 January 1880 – 7 November 1962) was a New Zealand rugby union player. He was educated at Timaru Main School. A loose forward, Budd represented South Canterbury at a provincial level, and was a member of the New Zealand national side, the All Blacks, for their tour of Australia in 1910. He played three matches on that tour, but did not appear in any internationals.

Budd remained in Australia after the tour, and he died in Melbourne in 1962.

Alf is not known to have been any relation to Alf Budd from Bluff who played for the All Blacks in 1946 and 1949.
