= Paddy Burns =

NZ international rugby union player (1881-1943)

- Born: Patrick James Burns; 10 March 1881 Lyttelton, New Zealand
- Died: 24 February 1943 (aged 61) Ashburton, New Zealand
- Occupation: Boilermaker

Rugby union career
- Position(s): Halfback, three-quarter
Provincial / State sides
Years	Team	Apps	(Points)
1904–13	Canterbury	50	
International career
Years	Team	Apps	(Points)
1908–13	New Zealand	5	(6)

Patrick James "Paddy" Burns (10 March 1881 – 24 February 1943) was a New Zealand rugby union player. A halfback and three-quarter, Burns represented Canterbury at a provincial level from 1904 to 1913, and was a member of the New Zealand national side, the All Blacks, between 1908 and 1913. He played nine matches for the All Blacks including five internationals.
