= Gerald McKellar (rugby union) =

NZ international rugby union player

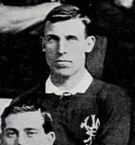
- Born: Gerald Forbes McKellar; 2 March 1884 Duntroon, New Zealand
- Died: 16 January 1960 (aged 75) Dunedin, New Zealand
- Height: 1.76 m (5 ft 9 1/4 in)
- Weight: 74 kg (164 lb)
- School: Otago Boys' High School
- Occupation: Customs officer

Rugby union career
- Position(s): Wing; Loose forward
Provincial / State sides
Years	Team	Apps	(Points)
1905	Hawke's Bay	2	
1908–10	Wellington	16	
1911–12	Otago	11	
International career
Years	Team	Apps	(Points)
1910	New Zealand	3	(0)

Gerald Forbes McKellar (2 March 1884 – 16 January 1960) was a New Zealand rugby union player. A wing and loose forward, McKellar represented Hawke's Bay, Wellington, and Otago at a provincial level. He was a member of the New Zealand national side, the All Blacks, on their 1910 tour of Australia, playing in five matches, including all three internationals.

McKellar died at Dunedin on 16 January 1960, and his ashes were buried at Andersons Bay Cemetery.
