= Jimmy Ridland =

New Zealand rugby union player (1882–1918)

- Born: Alexander James Ridland; 3 March 1882 Invercargill, New Zealand
- Died: 5 November 1918 (aged 36) France
- Height: 1.75 m (5 ft 9 in)
- Weight: 69 kg (153 lb)
- Occupation: Blacksmith

Rugby union career
- Position: Forward
Provincial / State sides
Years	Team	Apps	(Points)
1907–1913	Southland	22	
International career
Years	Team	Apps	(Points)
1910	New Zealand	3	(0)

Alexander James Ridland (3 March 1882 – 5 November 1918) was a New Zealand rugby union player. A forward, Ridland represented Southland at a provincial level, and was a member of the New Zealand national side, the All Blacks, in 1910. He played six matches for the All Blacks including three internationals.

Ridland was born in Invercargill in 1882 to William and Margaret Ridland, both of whom were originally from the Shetland Islands. Ridland enlisted in the New Zealand Expeditionary Force in October 1917 and embarked for Britain in May 1918. He was posted to France in September 1918 and served as a rifleman with the 1st Battalion, 3rd New Zealand Rifle Brigade. He died in France on 5 November 1918 as the result of gunshot wound to the head. He was buried at the Caudry British Cemetery.
