= John Smyth (English theologian) =

English Puritan leader, minister, and theologian (c. 1554 – 1612)

The Reverend John Smyth
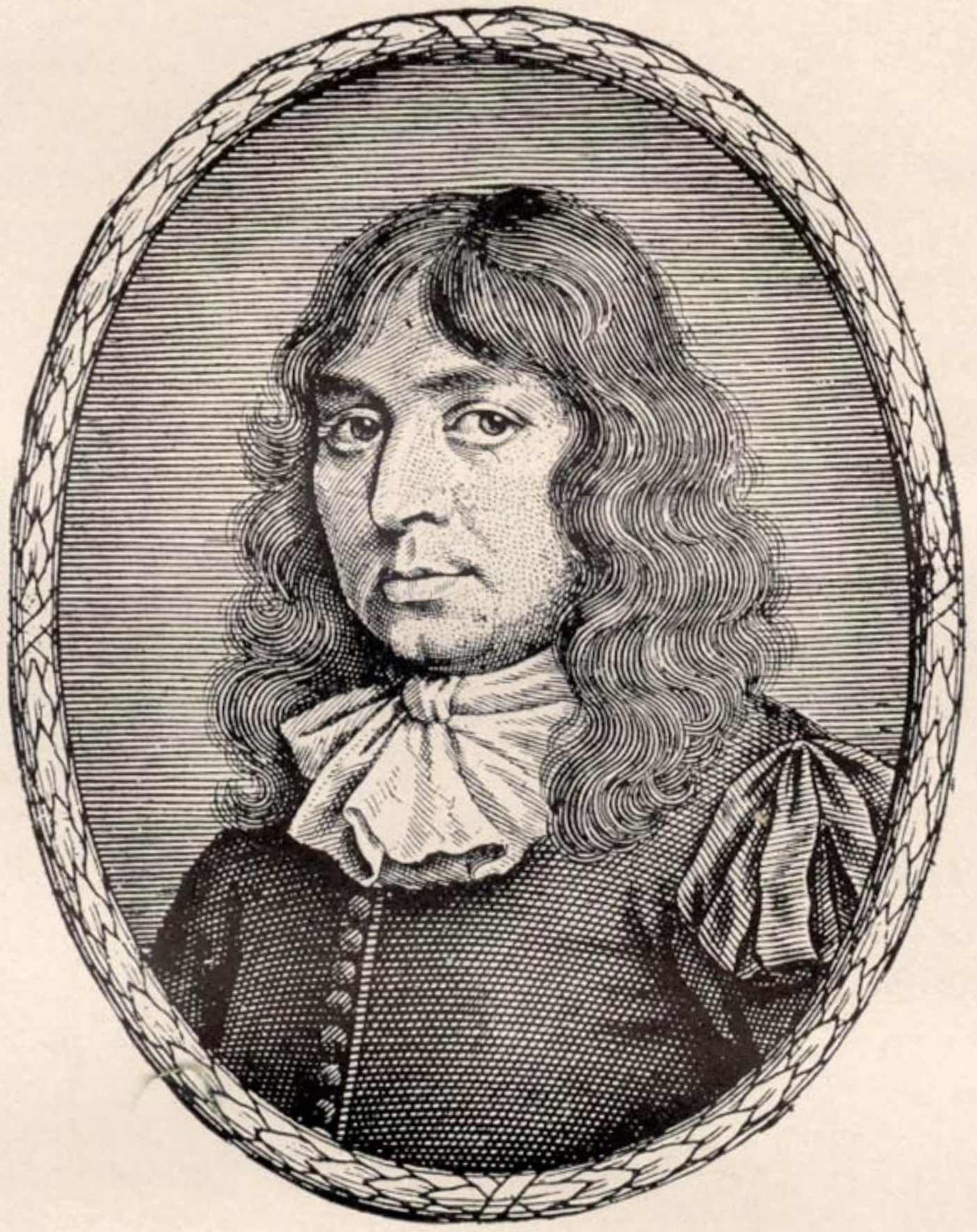
- Portrait of John Smyth
- Born: c. 1554; Sturton-le-Steeple, Nottinghamshire, Kingdom of England
- Died: 28 August 1612 (aged 57–58); Amsterdam, Holland, Dutch Republic
- Education: Christ's College, Cambridge
- Occupations: Minister, theologian

John Smyth (c. 1554 – 1612) was an English Puritan minister and theologian, former Church of England cleric, defender of the principle of religious liberty, being an influential figure for the development of the Baptist tradition, and later personally developing a Mennonite theology.

== Early life and education ==
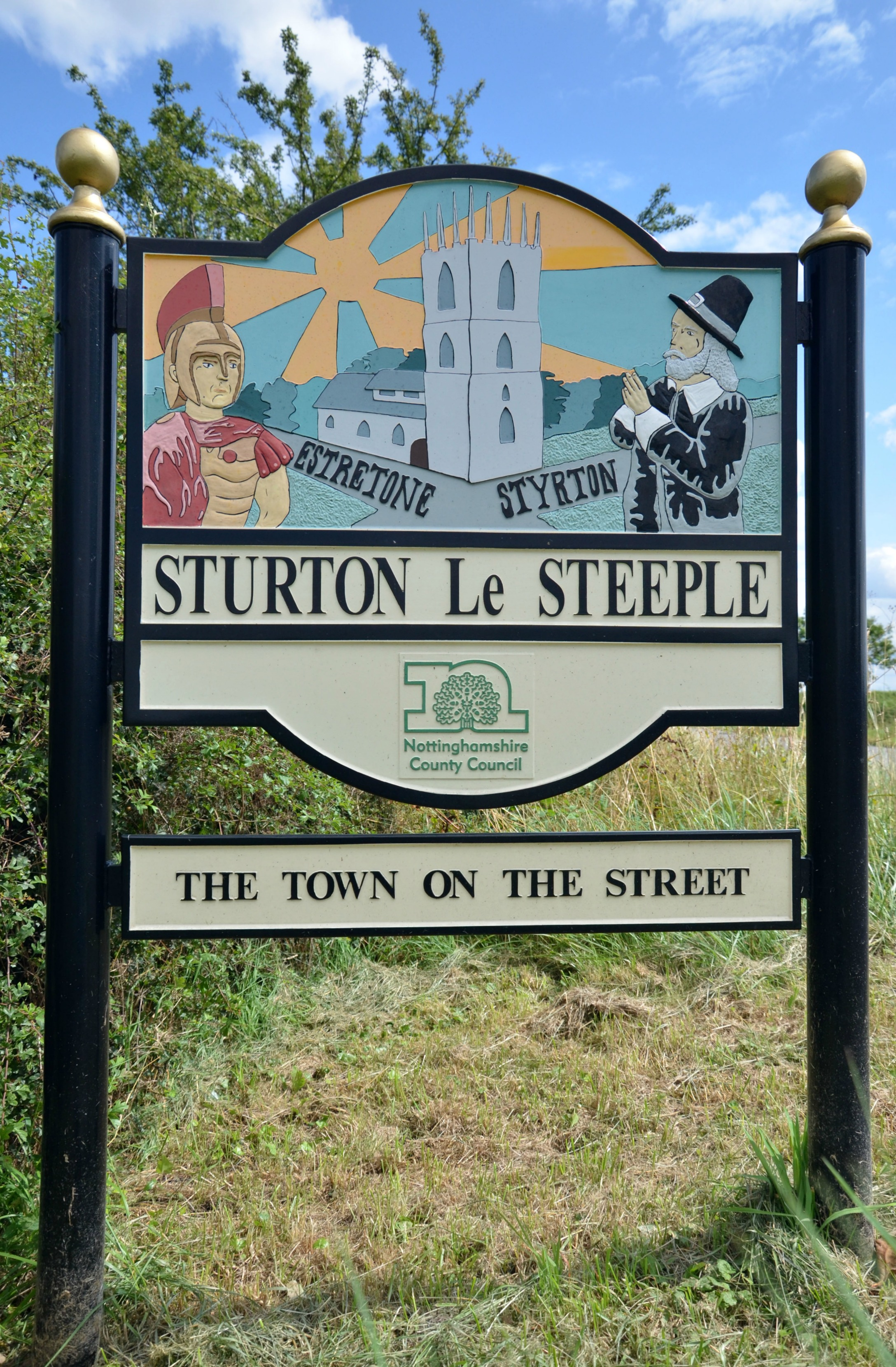

John Smyth, Jr., was born around 1554 in Sturton-le-Steeple, Nottinghamshire, in the Kingdom of England, to John Smyth, a known yeoman of Sturton. Smyth had his primary education partly under the local clergy, probably by the parish priest Rev. Quipp at the time. He was later admitted to Queen Elizabeth's Grammar School in Gainsborough, Lincolnshire. Smyth was matriculated in Christ's College, Cambridge. His education at Cambridge included the "trivium" and "quadrivium" which included a heavy emphasis upon Aristotelian logic and metaphysics. Smyth became notablely skilled in this field, and in the end of his course became a fellow, in 1594. Immediately after completing his studies in Christ's College, in 1594, Smyth was ordained as priest in the Church of England by Bishop John Aylmer, then the Bishop of London.

== Ministry ==
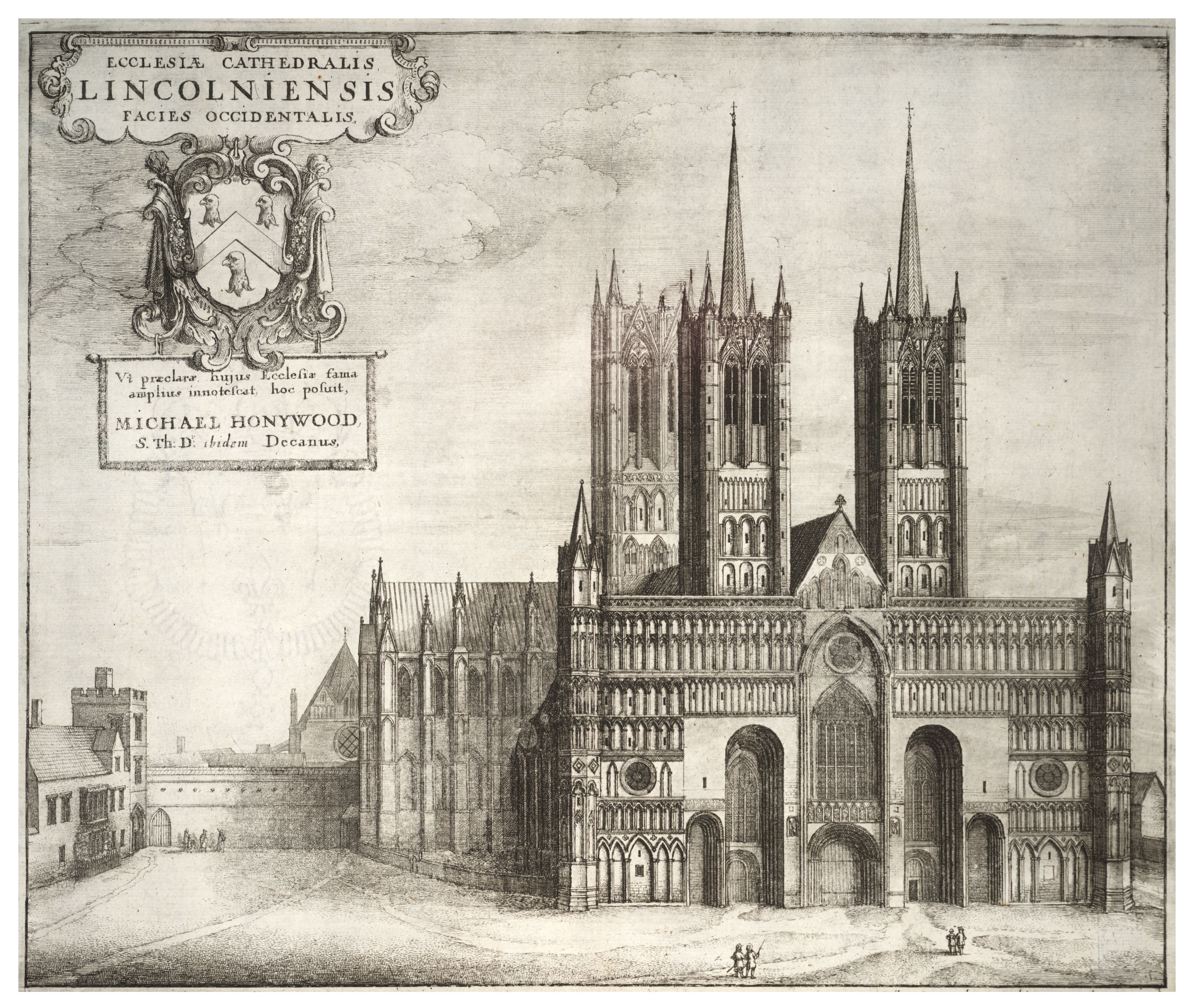

Smyth was appointed lecturer in the cathedral city of Lincoln, in 1600. He preached in Lincoln until 1602. During his office, Smyth adopted somewhat moderate Puritan views, accepting the set forms of prayer as well as both vocal and instrumental music in church. He was concerned with the influence of Recusants throughout the parish, and wrote in support of the British Crown's authority to govern the Church of England and appoint ecclesiastical magistrates.

== Puritan Conference in Coventry ==
In 1606, Smyth attended a Puritan conference in Coventry with other Puritan leaders, held in the mansion of Sir William Bowes, concerning Nonconformity to the established church.

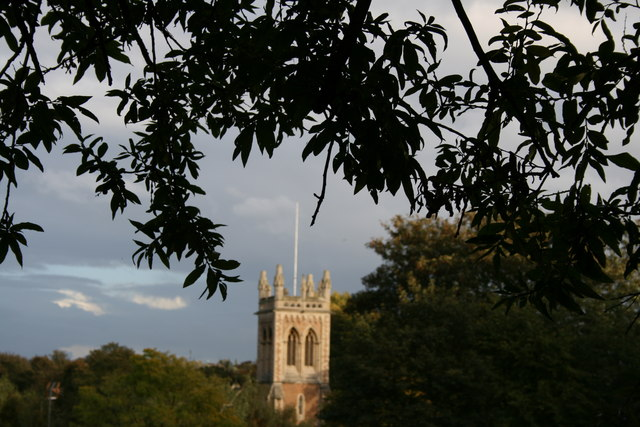

After the conference, returning home, Smyth became seriously ill and decided to stop in Basford, where he was rescued by Thomas Helwys. There, Smyth and Helwys became good friends and developed a close bond. Smyth was invited to preach in St Leodegarius Church, in Basford, by his friend John Herring, then parish priest, where he delivered a sermon.

== Leaving the Church of England ==
In 1607, Smyth was excommunicated by the Court of High Commission from the Church of England for alleged nonconformism, and was expelled from his office. Soon after, he travelled with Helwys to Gainsborough, where they encountered a group of Puritans who were recently excommunicated from their parish churches. Smyth organized a congregation in the medieval manor in Gainsborough, inside the Gainsborough Old Hall, owned and authorized by Sir William Hickman. Smyth was elected minister of the church, and he ordained Helwys as joint-minister to pastorate along with him.

== Exile in Holland ==
It was in Holland that Smyth discovered believer's baptism, opposed to infant baptism In 1608, he published The Differences of the Churches, in which he explained the characteristics of a biblical church:

First, Smyth insisted that true worship comes from the heart and that there should be no books other than the Bible in worship. Praying, singing and preaching should be spontaneous only. He did not read the Bible translation during worship, preferring the original language version.

Second, Smyth introduced a twofold church leadership, that of pastor and deacon and said that a church could have several pastors.

Third, the financial support of the church should come only from the members and not from the government, because that would mean giving them control over the church.

In 1609, Smyth, and Thomas Helwys, along with other Puritans, came to the conclusion of believer's baptism (thereby rejecting infant baptism). They were utterly convinced that believer's baptism and a free church gathered by covenant were foundational to the church. Having been baptized as infants, they came to believe they would need to be re-baptized. Since he was the only minister to performance the sacrament, Smyth baptized himself in 1609 (for which reason he was called "the Se-baptist," from the Latin word se '[one]self'), then baptized Thomas Helwys and the others.

John Clifford as cited in the General Baptist Magazine, London, July 1879, vol. 81) records that "[I]n 1606 on March 24. . .this night at midnight elder John Morton baptized John Smyth, vicar of Gainsborough, in the River Don. It was so dark we were obliged to have torch lights. Elder Brewster prayed, Mister Smith made a good confession; walked to Epworth in his cold clothes, but received no harm. The distance was over two miles. All of our friends were present. To the triune God be praise." This account was later revealed to have been a forgery connected with the rebuilding of the Baptist Church at Crowle, where the church (now closed) still bears a plaque falsely claiming to have been founded in 1599. It has been suggested by W. T. Whitley that Smyth may have coined such well-known theological terms as Pedobaptist.

In February 1610, Smyth and members of the church wrote a letter to a Mennonite community in Waterland to join their movement. Thomas Helwys, who was a joint-pastor, did not support this action, because, like other Protestants, he considered the Anabaptists as heretical and radical. He also wanted to reform England, not stay in Holland. Then Helwys excommunicated Smyth and other Puritans for heresy. They joined a Mennonite church, while Helwys and the church returned to England, and reestablished themselves not at Gainsborough, but in London, in 1612. The churches that descended from the Gainsborough church were of the General Baptist persuasion because, as the Baptist historian Tom J. Nettles argues that, Helwys and his group "earned the name General Baptists" because they "claimed that Christ died for all men rather than for the elect only". This is seen as a step away from fully Calvinist commitments.

== Death ==
He died from dysentery on 28 August 1612 in Amsterdam.

== See also ==
- Baptists
- Believer's baptism
- Baptist offices
