= Harry Paton (rugby union) =

- Born: Henry Paton; 12 February 1881 Dunedin, New Zealand
- Died: 21 January 1964 (aged 82) Dunedin, New Zealand
- Weight: 85 kg (187 lb)
- School: Waitaki Boys' High School

Rugby union career
- Position: Lock
Provincial / State sides
Years	Team	Apps	(Points)
1906–11	Otago	31	
1912–13	Wellington	16	
International career
Years	Team	Apps	(Points)
1907, 1910	New Zealand	2	(3)

Henry Paton (12 February 1881 – 21 January 1964) was a New Zealand rugby union player, administrator and referee. A lock, Paton represented Otago and Wellington at a provincial level, and was a member of the New Zealand national side, the All Blacks, in 1907 and 1910. He played seven matches for the All Blacks including two internationals. He also refereed at first-class level, and was a member of the management committee of the New Zealand Rugby Football Union from 1920 to 1921.
