= Sandy Paterson (rugby union) =

New Zealand rugby union player

- Born: Alexander Marshall Paterson; 31 October 1885 Dunedin, New Zealand
- Died: 29 July 1933 (aged 47) Dunedin, New Zealand
- Occupation: Labourer

Rugby union career
- Position: Loose forward
Provincial / State sides
Years	Team	Apps	(Points)
1908–14, 1920–21	Otago	43	
1908–1911	South Island	4	
International career
Years	Team	Apps	(Points)
1908–1910	New Zealand	5	(3)

Alexander Marshall Paterson (31 October 1885 – 29 July 1933) was a New Zealand rugby union player. A loose forward, Paterson represented Otago at a provincial level each side of World War I, and was a member of the New Zealand national side, the All Blacks, in 1908 and 1910. He played nine matches for the All Blacks including five internationals.

Paterson collapsed and died suddenly while at a rugby match at Carisbrook on 29 July 1933, and was buried at Andersons Bay Cemetery.
