= Thomas Helwys =

English barrister, theologian, reformer, and martyr (c. 1575 – 1616)

The Reverend Thomas Helwys
- Born: c. 1575; Gainsborough, Lincolnshire, Kingdom of England
- Died: 1616; London, Kingdom of England
- Education: Gray's Inn
- Occupations: Barrister, minister, theologian
- Spouse: Joan Ashmore
- Children: 7

Thomas Helwys (c. 1575 – 1616) was an English barrister, theologian, and religious reformer. His theological beliefs is one of the forming basis of the Baptist tradition. In the early 17th century, Helwys was the principal formulator of a demand that the Church and the state be kept separate in matters of law, so that individuals might have freedom of religious conscience. This advocacy of religious liberty could be dangerous at that time. He died in prison as a consequence of the persecution of English Dissenters under King James I, and is considered a martyr.

== Life ==
=== Early life and education ===
Broxtowe Hall in 1833

Thomas Helwys was born around 1575 in Gainsborough, Lincolnshire, in England, to Edmund and Margaret Helwys, descendants of an ancient Norman family. Edmund had sold his plot of lands in Lincolnshire and Northamptonshire and had taken a lease on Broxtowe Hall in Bilborough, Nottinghamshire. In 1590, Helwys's father died and was buried on 24 October, wishing to be buried "in the chancel, or near the pue door, with arms showing his marriage above". Helwys then assumed control of the estate in Bilborough.

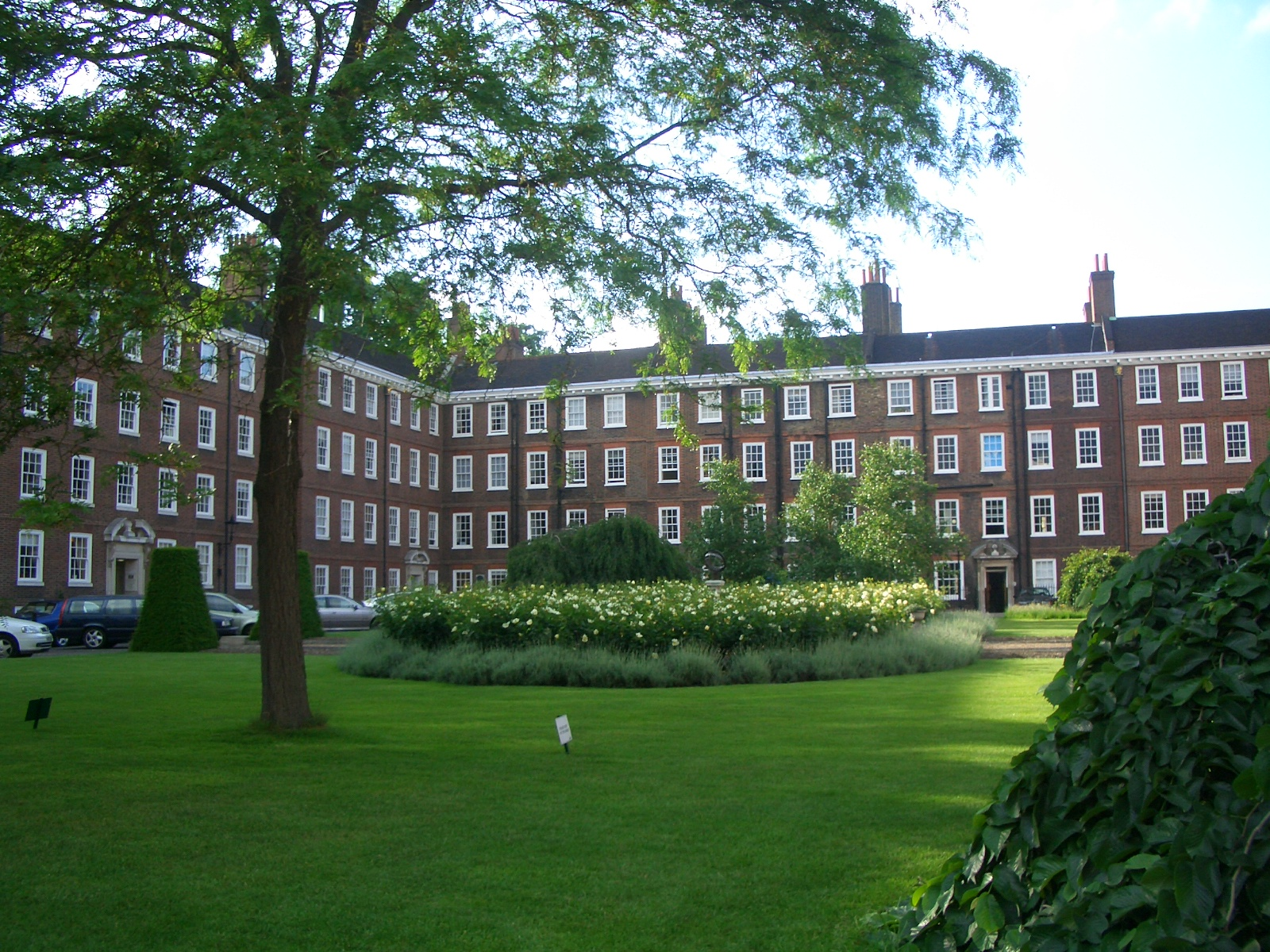
Gray's Inn Square, London

In early 1592, Helwys temporarily left the care of the estate in the hands of his father's friends and began studies in law at Gray's Inn on 29 January, one of the four Inns of Court in London. His family was on the rise in London. Geoffrey Helwys, his uncle, was a successful merchant, an alderman and the sheriff of London. His cousin Gervase Helwys was knighted by King James before becoming lieutenant of the Tower of London. After completing his studies at Gray's Inn, Helwys spent some time in the capital.

=== Marriage and Puritanism ===
Helwys married Joan Ashmore on December 1595, at St Martin's church, Bilborough. They had seven children over the next twelve years and lived at Broxtowe Hall. Helwys came into contact with Puritan leaders in the north of the county and, during this time, he authorized his Hall to become a safe centre for Puritan clerics within the Church of England, where conferences were held. Helwys and his family supported the Puritan party in the established church, and probably he had contributed financially to their missions.

== Conference in Coventry and Nonconformism ==
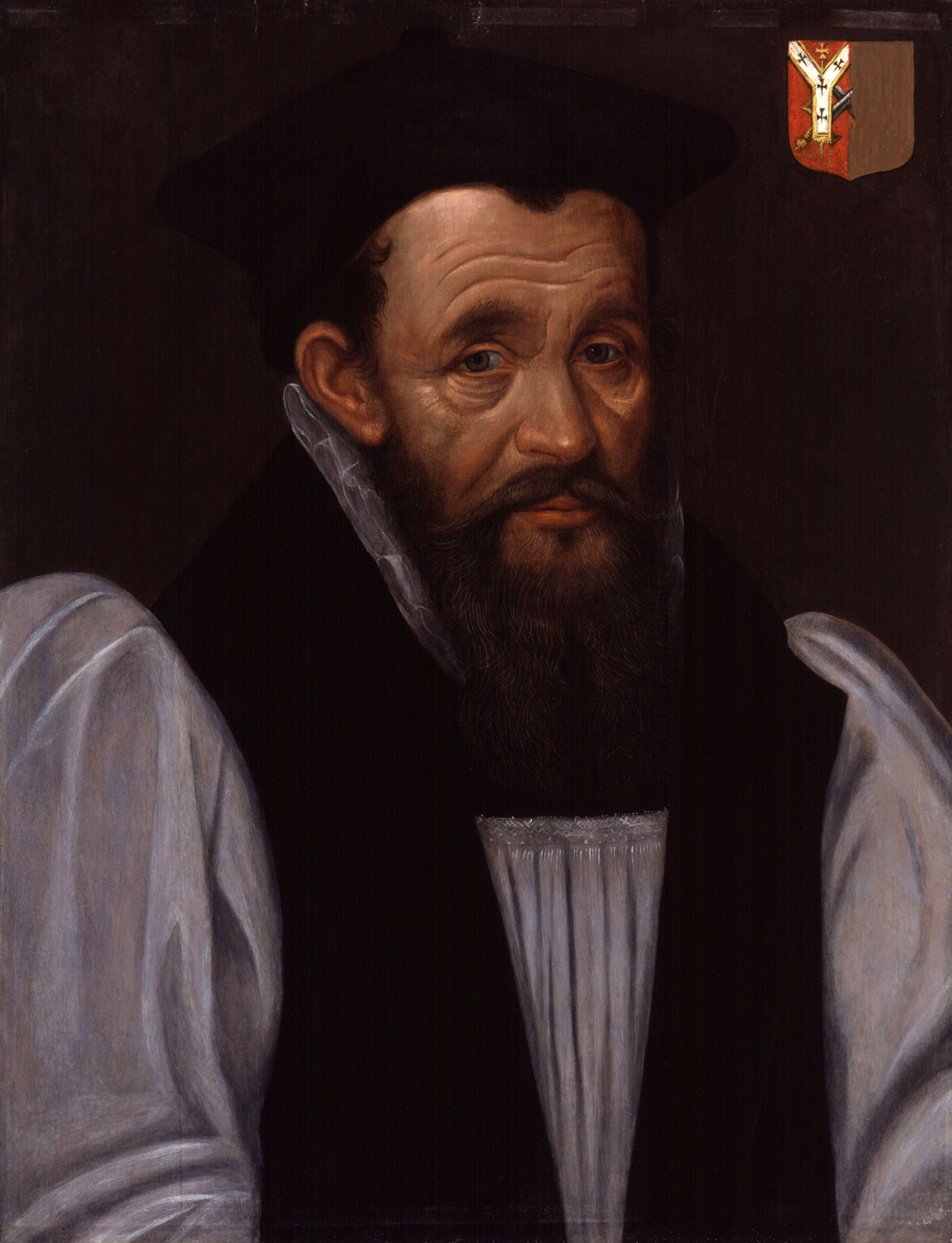

In 1606, the Archbishop Richard Bancroft was forcing ministers to submit to 141 canons, which included submitting to the 1604 version of the Book of Common Prayer and support to the episcopacy. Helwys decided to become part of the Puritan leadership and reform the English religious scene, even as a layman. He organized and took part in a Puritan conference in the city of Coventry, held in the mansion of Sir William Bowes and Isabel Wray, who were great supporters of the Puritans. The main subject discussed in the conference was Nonconformism, questioning whether should the Puritans dissent from the Church of England. The conference included Nonconformist leaders such as John Smyth, John Robinson, Richard Bernard and Arthur Hildersham. After the conference in Coventry, Helwys had moved to Basford, in the same year. There he refuged Smyth, who was very ill and weak. During his time in Basford, Smyth and Helwys developed a close bond.

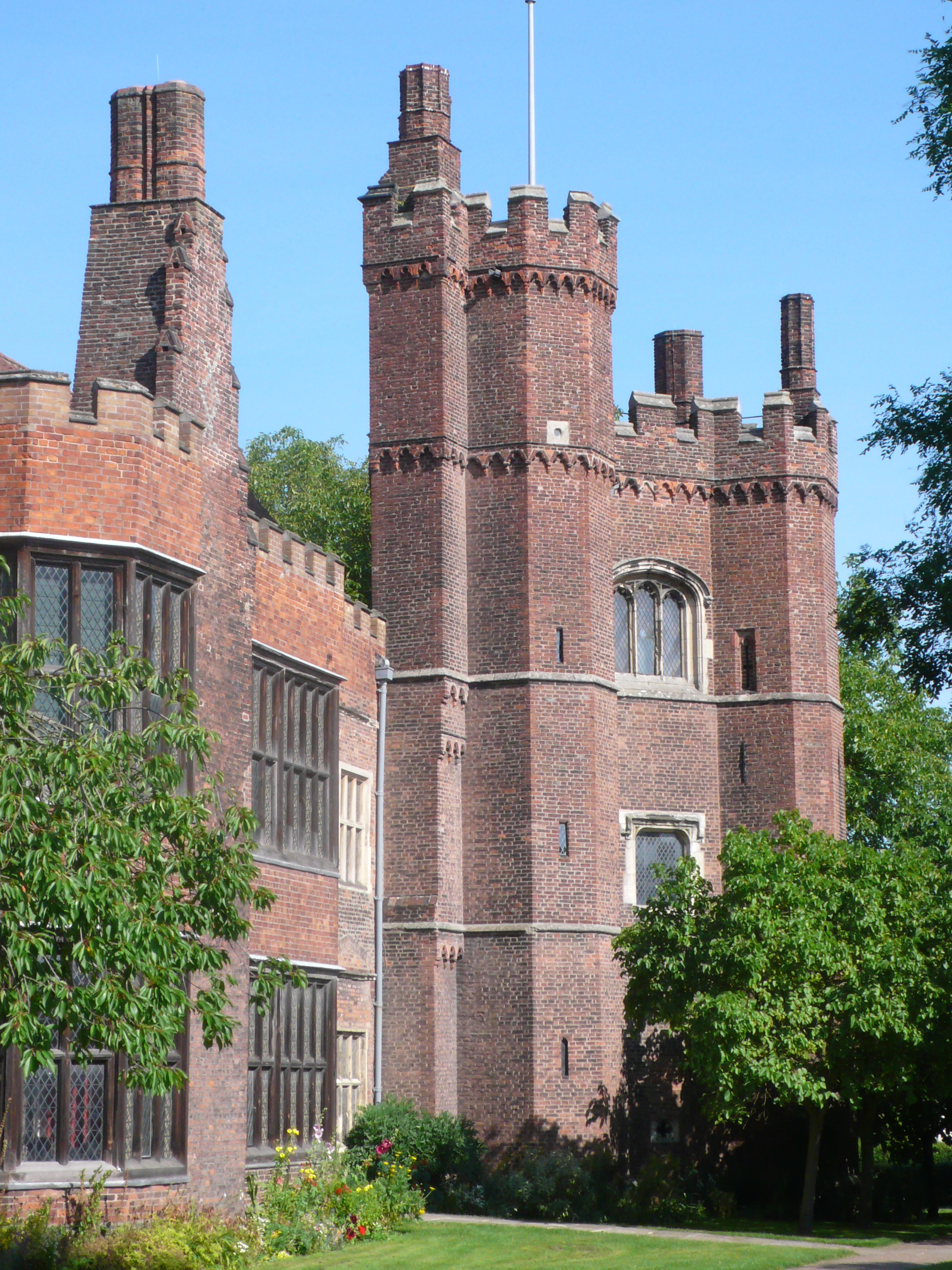
Gainsborough Old Hall

In 1607, The High Court of Ecclesiastical Commission heard about the conference in Coventry. They took active proceedings in excommunicating most of the Puritans who attended the conference and expelled the clerics from their office. After their excommunications, the main Puritan leaders pastored and organized the Scrooby church, at the outskirt of Bawtry parish, led by Richard Clyfton and Robison, and the Gainsborough church, at a manor in Gainsborough, led by Smyth and Helwys. Helwys was probably ordained joint-minister by Smyth in the Gainsborough church, in the same year, and was discipled in the subjects of divinity (theology). The church was organized in Gainsborough Old Hall in Lincolnshire, authorized by the sympathetic owner Sir William Hickman, and around 70 Puritans were members.

== Exile to Continental Europe ==
The Court of High Commission proceeded to persecute the Gainsborough and Scrooby churches. The magistrates imprisoned some of the Puritans and were raiding houses. Helwys organized and funded two moves to the Dutch Republic, in Continental Europe, staying in exile to escape the persecution imposed by the High Court.

=== First move ===
In late 1607, Helwys hired a sea captain to take the Puritans from Gainsborough and Scrooby to Holland from the port town of Boston, in Lincolnshire. They all packed their belongings, and set out on foot to Boston. However, before arriving at Boston, the captain betrayed them to the High Court. They were temporarily confined in cells on the first floor of the Boston Guildhall and their packages were ransacked. Helwys was presented to the magistrates in Basford with his wife Joan for not attending St Leodegarius Church, in Basford, and receiving Holy Communion.

=== Second move ===
In 1608, Helwys funded the last move to escape the High Court through Stallingborough—according to Robinson, "If any brought oars, he brought sails." The sea captain with the men boarded sailed to Holland, but the ship with women and children boarded got stuck in mud, and horsemen came to seize them. They were briefly imprisoned, but later were authorized by the magistrates to sail to the Dutch Republic. Helwys allowed his family to remain in England, assuming their safety. However, Helwys' house in Bilborough was seized and his wife Joan was arrested by order of Tobias Matthew, then Archbishop of York, and after refusing to take the oath in court she was imprisoned in York Castle, but was banished after three months.

== The Amsterdam Church ==
Helwys and the other Dissenters travelled to the safety and tolerance of the Dutch Republic with their followers and supporters. The former Gainsborough church settled in Amsterdam, whereas the former Scrooby church settled in Leiden.

== Beginning of the Baptist tradition ==
It was in the exiled Amsterdam church, in the Dutch Republic, among the English émigrés, that a distinctive Baptist theology started first to emerge, and Helwys was one of the pioneer theologians. In the conclusion of the Coventry conference, Helwys embraced the theological concept of regenerate church and that church membership was only of believers. In January 1609, Helwys, along with Smyth, taking a logical conclusion of this doctrine, adopted a different opinion concerning the baptizand on the sacrament of Baptism, arguing that if water Baptism makes a person member of the visible Church, then only believers should be admitted to it—and not infants.

Since they were baptised as an infant, Smyth—in the absence of another minister in higher office—rebaptised himself first, then rebaptised Helwys, John Murton, and the rest of the Dissenters within the Amsterdam church. The exiled Leiden church didn't adopt the practice and remained paedobaptist. Thus, the dissenting Puritans in Amsterdam became credobaptists and those in Leiden stayed paedobaptists. Later that year, the exiled Amsterdam church, led by Smyth and Helwys, started renting a church building from a Dutch Mennonite to conduct their services. Helwys was persuaded by the local Mennonites to abandon the doctrine of predestination, but he refused. Some members of the church accepted a heretical christology common to early Mennonites called Hoffmanite Christology (the belief that Jesus Christ's humanity was not from the Virgin Mary, his mother). Smyth and Helwys did not accept it, so they excommunicated these members for heresy.

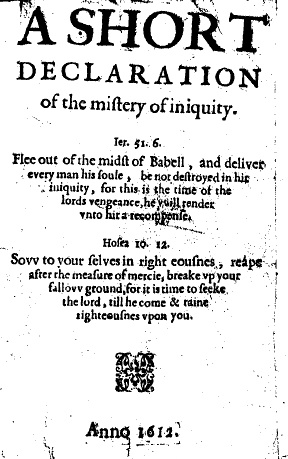
Title page of Helwys's A Short Declaration of the Mistery of Iniquity (1612)

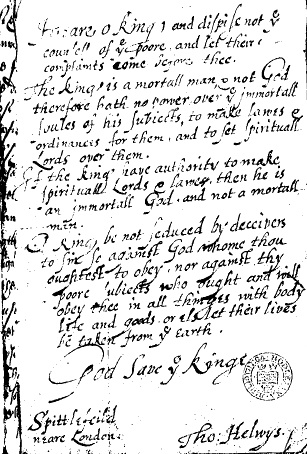
Message from Helwys to James I that resulted in Helwys's imprisonment and death

In 1610, Smyth decided he had been wrong to baptise himself and applied to unite with the Mennonites, accepting their christology, and be re-baptized. Helwys excommunicated Smyth for heresy, wrote against it, and assumed the main leadership of the church with about twelve members. Helwys formulated the earliest Baptist confession of faith, in 1611, addressing to fellow Puritans in England. The confession became known as the 27 Articles of Faith or the Helwys' Declaration of Faith, also the Helwys' Confession. In the next twelve months or so, Helwys wrote three important works:

A Short and Plain Proof, arguing for Reformed Arminianism;

An Advertisement or Admonition to the Congregations, condemning the Anabaptists as heretics, showing their differences with them, and explaining their christological errors;

And A Short Declaration of the Mistery of Iniquity, criticizing the failings of Roman Catholicism, the Church of England and forms of Puritanism. It defends relevant Puritan Reformed doctrines such as baptismal efficacy and it was the first English book in the western civilization to defend the principle of total religious liberty. For Helwys, the liberty of religious conscience was a right for everyone, whether Protestants, Roman Catholics, Jews or Muslims. The book also argued that Nonconformist ministers such as Smyth and Robinson had been wrong to take the English congregations overseas to escape persecution and that they should return to England to advocate for reformation. The historian of Separatism, Stephen Tomkins, describes A Short Declaration of the Mistery of Iniquity as the most radical and outspoken book of the age and "the most far-reaching declaration of universal religious freedom yet seen in English", but adds: "It is a pity that this most ground-breaking treatise of the Separatist movement should also be its most mean-spirited."

== Return to England ==
Despite the obvious risks involved, Helwys with the other 12 émigrés, in 1612, returned to England and settled the church in White's Alley, Spitalfields, East London, considered the first Baptist church in England. Helwys brought The Mistery of Iniquity with him, and one copy of it was delivered to King James, with a handwritten inscription arguing for liberty of conscience. "The King", Helwys said, "is a mortal man, and not God, therefore he hath no power over the mortal soul of his subjects to make laws and ordinances for them and to set spiritual Lords over them." Helwys and other members of the congregation were thrown into Newgate Gaol, where they wrote a petition to the king. Persecution for Religion Judg’d and Condemn’d was written in Newgate in 1616, either by Helwys or John Murton.

== Death and legacy ==
Helwys died around 1616 at about the age of forty. Helwys' presentation copy of A Short Declaration of the Mistery of Iniquity is preserved in the Bodleian Library. Helwys is honoured with the Helwys Hall at Regent's Park College, Oxford. Thomas Helwys Baptist Church in Lenton, Nottingham, is named after him. Broxtowe Hall, the Helwys' family home, is now only a remnant, but in nearby Bilborough Baptist Church there is a simple plaque to his memory.
